= Functional grammar =

Functional grammar may refer to:

- Functional linguistics, a range of functionally based approaches to linguistics
- Functional discourse grammar, grammar models developed by Simon C. Dik that explain how utterances are shaped based on the goals of language users
- Systemic functional grammar, a grammatical description developed by Michael Halliday
- Danish functional linguistics, a strand of functional linguistics associated with linguists at the University of Copenhagen
- Lexical functional grammar, a variety of generative grammar initiated by Joan Bresnan and Ronald Kaplan
- Role and reference grammar, a model of grammar developed by William Foley and Robert Van Valin, Jr.
