= Linguistic system =

Systems of language

The idea of language as a linguistic system appears in the linguistic theory of Ferdinand de Saussure, J.R. Firth, Benjamin Lee Whorf, Louis Hjelmslev, and Michael Halliday.

The paradigmatic principle - the idea that the process of using language involves choosing from a specifiable set of options - was established in semiotics by Saussure, whose concept of value (viz. “valeur”), and of signs as terms in a system, “showed up paradigmatic organization as the most abstract dimension of meaning”

== 'System' in systemic functional linguistics ==
“System” is used in two related ways in systemic functional linguistics (SFL). SFL uses the idea of system to refer to language as a whole, (e.g. “the system of language”). This usage derives from Hjelmslev. In this context, Jay Lemke describes language as an open, dynamic system.

There is also the notion of “system” as used by J.R. Firth, where linguistic systems are considered to furnish the background for elements of structure. Halliday argues that, unlike system in the sense in which it was used by Firth was a conception only found in Firth’s linguistic theory.

In this use of the term “system”, grammatical, or other features of language, are considered best understood when described as sets of options. Thus, “the most abstract categories of the grammatical description are the systems together with their options (systemic features). A systemic grammar differs from other functional grammars (and from all formal grammars) in that it is paradigmatic: a system is paradigmatic set of alternative features, of which one must be chosen if the entry condition is satisfied.

In Halliday’s early work, “system” was considered to be one of four fundamental categories for the theory of grammar, the others being unit, structure and class. The category of ‘system’ was invoked to account for “the occurrency of one rather than another from among a number of like events” At that time, Halliday defined grammar as “that level of linguistic form at which operate closed systems”

In adopting a system perspective on language, systemic functional linguistics can be seen as part of a more general 20th and 21st century reaction against atomistic approaches to science, in which an essence is sought after within smaller and smaller components of the phenomenon under study. In systems thinking, any delineated object of study is defined by its relations to other units postulated by the theory. In systemic functional linguistics, this has been described as the trinocular perspective. Thus a descriptive category must be defended from three perspectives: from above (‘what does it construe?’ ‘what effect does it have in a context of use?’), below (‘how is this function realized?’) and round about (‘what else is in the neighbourhood?’ ‘what other things does this thing have to interact with?’). This gives systemic functional linguistics an affinity with studies of complex systems.
