= Frances Christie =

Australian scholar of language

Frances Helen Christie (born 1939), is Emeritus professor of language and literacy education at the University of Melbourne, and honorary professor of education at the University of Sydney. She specialises in the field of systemic functional linguistics (SFL) and has completed research in language and literacy education, writing development, pedagogic grammar, genre theory, and teaching English as a mother tongue and as a second language.

== Biography ==
Christie was born in Sydney in 1939. She was educated at Cremorne Girls' High School and completed a BA majoring in English and history, and a Dip Ed., at the University of Sydney. Her teaching career took her to schools in rural New South Wales and to London in the UK. While completing a Master of Education at the University of Sydney (1977), Christie was highly influenced by the outstanding scholar of the history of educational theory, curriculum design and pedagogical principles in the western tradition, W. F. Connell (1916–2001), and focused her thesis on the history of English teaching in the Australian colony of NSW.

During her time with the Australian federal government Curriculum Development Centre, Canberra (1978–81), Christie worked on the national Language Development Project (LDP), a curriculum development initiative addressing the English oral language and literacy needs of children in the upper primary to junior secondary school years. At the same time, she was studying and working with M. A. K. Halliday, a consultant on the LDP, at the University of Sydney. She completed a PhD on early primary school writing development (supervised by J.R. Martin, University of Sydney) in 1990.

Her academic career took her to Melbourne, to Deakin University (1985–90), to Darwin (1990–94) to the then Northern Territory University (now known as Charles Darwin University) and back to Melbourne (1994) where she was appointed Foundation Professor of Language and Literacy Education at the University of Melbourne, a position she held till her retirement in 2002, when she was appointed emeritus professor. She also holds an honorary professorship at the University of Sydney.

== Career ==
Her work on the English language curriculum was not without controversy, based as it was in a model of language development inspired by the work of M.A.K. Halliday. The model centred on three core areas: learning language (i.e. the basic resources of sound, grammar, commenced in infancy); learning through language (i.e. simultaneously learning to use language to shape experience, create relationships, make sense of the world); and learning about the language (i.e. learning about the resource that is one's language, where the latter is primarily a responsibility of schooling). At the time, English teachers resisted any formal talk of teaching knowledge about language. However, Christie argued that language study should be about building a knowledge of the language with which to live and to go on learning, and this meant bringing knowledge about language (KAL) into focus.

Christie also noticed and nurtured valuable connections between the work of Basil Bernstein, the SFL model and pedagogy, bringing Bernstein to Melbourne in 1996 to collaborate. Her most recent collaboration with Beverly Derewianka (University of Wollongong) was an Australian Research Council (2004–06) funded project investigating the key indicators of development in adolescent writing in English, History and Science. The book 'School Discourse' (2008) that Christie and Derewanka co-authored out of this project was described by Mary J. Schleppegrell (School of Education, University of Michigan, USA) as "a tremendous contribution to our understanding of the paths learners follow in written language development from early childhood to late adolescence".

Christie has also been instrumental in bringing the work of other scholars to publication, for example in the Series on Language Education she edited for Oxford University Press. Christie has made a significant contribution to educational linguistics and to the development of the English language curriculum in Australia. She was also the founding President (1995–97) of the Australian Systemic Functional Linguistics Association (ASFLA).

== Key publications ==
Christie, F. & K. Watson 1972. Language and the Mass Media. Sydney: A.H. & A.W. Reed.

Christie, F., D. Mallick, R. Lewis & J. Mallick 1973. Some Say a Word is Dead. Sydney: Holt, Rinehart & Winston.

Christie, F., W.F. Connell, P. Jones, & R. Lawson 1974. China at School. Sydney: Novak.

Christie, F., D. Mallick, R. Lewis & J. Mallick 1976. The Growing Green. Melbourne: Heinemann Educational Australia.

Christie, F. & J. Rothery 1979. Language in Teacher Education: Child Language Development and English Language Studies. Applied Linguistics Association of Australia Occasional Papers Number 3.

Christie, F & J. Rothery (eds.) 1980. Varieties of Language and Language Teaching. Applied Linguistics Association of Australia Occasional Papers Number 4.

Christie, F. 1985. Language Education. Deakin University, Geelong, Victoria.

Christie, F. 1986. Language and Education. A.A.T.E. Studies in English, Number 2. Australian Association for the Teaching of English, Adelaide.

Christie, F (ed.). 1989. Language education. Oxford: Oxford University Press.

Christie, F. (ed.) 1990. Literacy in a Changing Word. Melbourne: ACER.

Christie, F. 1993. Introduction to Mother Tongue Education. Dakar: UNESCO Office.

Christie, F. 1993. 'The "received tradition" of English teaching: the decline of rhetoric and the corruption of grammar'. In Bill Green (ed.) The Insistence of the Letter. Literary Studies and Curriculum Theorizing. Falmer Press, London, pages 75–106.

Christie, F. & J. Foley (eds.) 1996. Some Contemporary Themes in Literacy Research. Münster: Waxmann.

Christie, F. & J. R. Martin (eds.) 1997. Genres and Institutions: Social Processes in the Workplace and School. London: Cassell Academic.

Christie, F. & R. Misson (eds.) 1997. Literacy and Schooling. London: Routledge.

Christie, F. (ed.) 1999. Pedagogy and the shaping of consciousness : linguistic and social processes. London: Cassell Academic.

Christie, F. & A. Soosai 2000. Language and Meaning 1. Melbourne: Macmillan Education.

Christie, F. & A. Soosai 2001. Language and Meaning 2. Melbourne: Macmillan Education.

Christie, F. & J. R. Martin 2000. Genre and institutions: social processes in the workplace and school. London and New York: Continuum.

Christie, F. 2002. Classroom discourse analysis : a functional perspective. R. Fawcett (ed.). London/New York: Continuum.

Christie, F. 2004a ‘The study of language and subject English’. Australian Review of Applied Linguistics, 27, 1, pages 15–29.

Christie, F. 2004b ‘Authority and its role in the pedagogic relationship of schooling’. In Lynne Young and Claire Harrison (eds.) Systemic Functional Linguistics and Critical Discourse Analysis. Studies in Social Change. London and NY: Continuum, pages 173–201.

Christie, F. 2004c ‘Systemic functional linguistics and a theory of language in education’. In V. Heberle and JL Meurer (Guest eds.) Systemic Functional Linguistics in Action. A Special Edition of The Journal of English Language, Literatures in English and Cultural Studies, Universidade Federal De Santa Catarina, pages13-40.

Christie, F. 2004d ‘Revisiting some old themes: the role of grammar in the teaching of English’. In Joseph A Foley (ed.) Language, Education and Discourse: Functional Approaches. London and NY: Continuum, pages 145–173.

Christie, F. 2005 Language education in the primary years. Sydney: University of NSW Press.

Christie, F. & J. R. Martin (eds.) 2007. Language, knowledge and pedagogy: functional linguistic and sociological perspectives. London and New York: Continuum.

Christie, F. & B. Derewianka 2008. School discourse: learning to write across the years of schooling. London and New York: Continnum.

Christie, F. & S. Simpson (eds.) 2010. Literacy and Social Responsibility : Multiple Perspectives. London and Oakville: Equinox.

Christie, F. & K. Maton (eds.) 2011. Disciplinarity: Functional Linguistic and Sociological Perspectives. London and New York: Continuum.

Christie, F. 2012. Language education throughout the school years : a functional perspective. Language Learning Monograph Series. USA: Wiley-Blackwell.
