= Alice Caffarel =

French-Australian linguist

- Born: 1961 (age 64–65)

Academic background
- Education: University of Sydney

Academic work
- Discipline: Linguist
- Sub-discipline: Systemic Functional Linguistics
- Institutions: University of Sydney

Alice Marie-Claude Caffarel-Cayron (born 30 June 1961) is a French-Australian linguist. She is an Honorary Senior Lecturer in Linguistics at the University of Sydney. Caffarel is recognized for the development of a Systemic Functional Grammar of French which has been applied in the teaching of the French language, Discourse analysis and Stylistics at the University of Sydney. Caffarel is recognised as an expert in the field of French Systemic Functional Linguistics (SFL).

== Biography ==
Caffarel was born in Bordeaux, France in 1961 and moved to Australia in 1983. She began her undergraduate studies in Linguistics at the University of Sydney in 1987, graduating in 1991 with First Class Honours. Her thesis research on the semantics of French tense was published in 1992. She completed a PhD in Linguistics at the University of Sydney in 1996. Her PhD thesis was a prolegomenon to a Systemic Functional grammar of French. She served as an associate lecturer at the University of Sydney in 1996, which was then converted into a tenured full-time lecturing position in 1998.

In 1996 and 1999, Caffarel co-organized the first and second Systemic Functional Typology/Topology Workshops with Professor J.R. Martin. These workshops resulted in a volume of papers, published December 2004, which she co-edited with J.R. Martin and C.M.I.M. Matthiessen from the Department of Linguistics at Macquarie University. In 2003, Caffarel was awarded a Faculty of Arts Teaching Excellence Award at the University of Sydney. Since joining the French Studies Department in 1996, Caffarel has expanded the linguistic curriculum and taught a number of linguistic units on language development, language teaching methodology, functional grammar, discourse analysis, ideology in news, and stylistics. She became Chair of the French Studies Department at the University of Sydney in 2009 until mid-2011.

In addition to her work in expanding the linguistic curriculum in the Department of French Studies, Caffarel has published a number of books and book chapters on French grammar. One of her latest works is a book chapter, "The Verbal Group in French," in The Routledge Handbook of Systemic Functional Linguistics.

== Contributions to linguistics ==
Caffarel has contributed to the development of a Systemic Functional Language theory of the French language. Her work on developing a Systemic Functional Grammar of French is unique as "it is discourse-based and provides an interpretation of grammar which reflects how French speakers/writers make meaning in various contexts of use". M.A.K. Halliday, in the foreword to her 2006 monograph, described her contribution to theory in the following way:

The consistent interplay between theoretical and applied pursuits has always been a defining feature of systemic functional theory, where no clear line is drawn between application and theory and each is a source of positive input to the other. This kind of mutual enrichment is clearly demonstrated in Alice Caffarel's work. The result is a description that penetrates the heart of the language, revealing it at one and the same time as a specimen of the human semiotic and a unique resource for the continuous creation of meaning. (Halliday, 2006: i)

Her work has been used as an instrumental resource in the discourse analysis and interpretation of French texts, and as a model for developing descriptions of other languages from a Systemic Functional perspective.

In addition to her description of French as a tool for the analysis of meaning, Caffarel also worked with a number of Systemic Functional Linguistics researchers from universities around Australia on an international news project which analyzed the coverage of news on the Middle East in various languages, focusing on ideology and text structure.

Caffarel's current work focuses on developing a comprehensive account of the language of the French writer and philosopher Simone de Beauvoir. This work aims to elucidate Beauvoir's use of language as a mode of action and tool for change by analyzing recurrent linguistic choices significant to Beauvoir's philosophy and to the communicative force of her writings. It explores the aspects of Beauvoir's language that contribute to a particular vision of the world that promotes freedom and change, and extend agency and transcendence to her readers.

== Selected publications ==
- Caffarel-Cayron, A. (2018). Simone de Beauvoir's construal of language and literature in Mémoires d’une jeune fille rangée (1958): A Hasanian perspective. In Wegener, Oesterle, Neumann (Eds.), On Verbal Art: essays in honour of Ruqaiya Hasan, (pp. 132–165).Sheffield and Bristol: Equinox.
- Caffarel-Cayron, A. (2017). The Verbal Group in French. In Tom Bartlett and Gerard O’Grady (Eds.), The Routledge Handbook of Systemic Functional Linguistics, (pp. 319–337). London and New York: Routledge.
- Caffarel-Cayron, A. (2016). Beauvoir and the Agency of Writing. In David Banks and Janet Ormrod (Eds.), Nouvelles études sur la transitivité en francais: Une perspective systémique fonctionnelle, (pp. 57–80). Paris: L'Harmattan.
- Caffarel-Cayron, A., Rechniewski, E. (2014). Exploring the generic structure of French editorials from the perspective of systemic functional linguistics. Journal of World Languages, 1(1), 18-37.
- Caffarel-Cayron, A. (2010). Systemic functional grammar and the study of meaning. In Heiko Narrog, Bernd Heine (Eds.), The Oxford Handbook of Linguistic Analysis, (pp. 797–825). Oxford: Oxford University Press.
- Caffarel, A., Rechniewski, E. (2009). A systemic functional approach to analyzing and interpreting ideology: an illustration from French editorials. Revista Alicantina de Estudios Ingleses, 22, 27-43
- Caffarel, A., Rechniewski, E. (2008). When is a Handover not a Handover? A case study of the ideologically opposed French news stories. In Thompson, Elizabeth A. and White, P.R.R. (Eds.), Communicating Conflict: Multilingual Case Studies of the News Media, (pp. 25–49). London and New York: Continuum.
- Caffarel, A. 2006/2008. A Systemic Functional Grammar of French: From grammar to discourse. London: Continuum.
- Caffarel, A. 2006. Learning Advanced French through SFL; Learning SFL in French. in Byrnes, H. (ed.), Advanced Language Learning: The Contribution of Halliday and Vygotsky, (pp204–224). London: Continuum.
- Caffarel, A., Martin, J., Matthiessen, C. (2004). Language Typology: A functional perspective. Amsterdam: John Benjamins Publishing Company.
- Caffarel, A. (2004). The construal of a second-order semiosis in Camus’ L'Étranger. In D. Banks (ed.). Text and Texture: Systemic functional viewpoints on the nature and structure of text, (pp 537–570). Paris: L’Harmattan.
- Caffarel, A. (1992). Interacting between a generalized tense semantics and register-specific semantic tense systems: a bi-stratal exploration of the semantics of French tense. Language Sciences 14.4. pp 385–418.
