= Stratification (linguistics) =

In linguistics, stratification is the idea that language is organized in terms of hierarchically ordered strata (such as phonology, morphology, syntax, and semantics). This notion can be traced back to Saussure's dichotomy between signified and signifier and Hjelmslev's expression plane and content plane, but has been explicictly explored as a theoretical concept in stratificational linguistics and systemic functional linguistics.

== In systemic functional linguistics ==
Contextual and linguistic strata as a series of contangential circles. In green: content plane; in warm colors: expression plane.

In systemic functional linguistics, stratification is one of the global semiotic dimensions that define the organization of language in context, alongside instantiation and metafunction. Stratification orders "language in context into subsystem according to the degree of symbolic abstraction"; these subsystems are called strata, which are related by realization. Authors differ on how to characterize (and further stratify) each stratum, but the general scheme is always followed:

- Context is realized by language (content plane + expression plane).
- In language, the content plane (semantics and lexicogrammar) is realized by the expression plane.
- In the content plane, semantics is realized by lexicogrammar.

In the model proposed by Michael Halliday, the expression plane is stratified into phonology and phonetics, so that (⭨ means "is realized by"):

- context ⭨ language
- = context ⭨ (content plane ⭨ expression plane)
- = context ⭨ ((semantics ⭨ lexicogrammar) ⭨ (phonology ⭨ phonetics))

Each stratum can be defined as follows:

- Context: "Higher-order semiotic system above the linguistic system. Context covers the spectrum of field [related to the ideational metafunction], tenor [related to the interpersonal metafunction] and mode [related to the textual metafunction]."
- Semantics: "the highest stratum within language; it serves as an ‘interface’ between language and the environment outside language. [...] As the upper of the two content strata within language, semantics is the interface between context and lexicogrammar. Semantics transforms experience and interpersonal relationships into linguistic meaning, and lexicogrammar transforms this meaning into words".
- Lexicogrammar: "the central processing unit of language, the powerhouse where meanings are created", "the stratum of wording, located between semantics and phonology [...]: the resources for construing meanings as wordings".
- Phonology: "the organization of speech sound into formal structures and systems".
- Phonetics: "the interfacing with the body's resources for speech and for hearing".
