= Relational network theory =

Theory of language usage and production

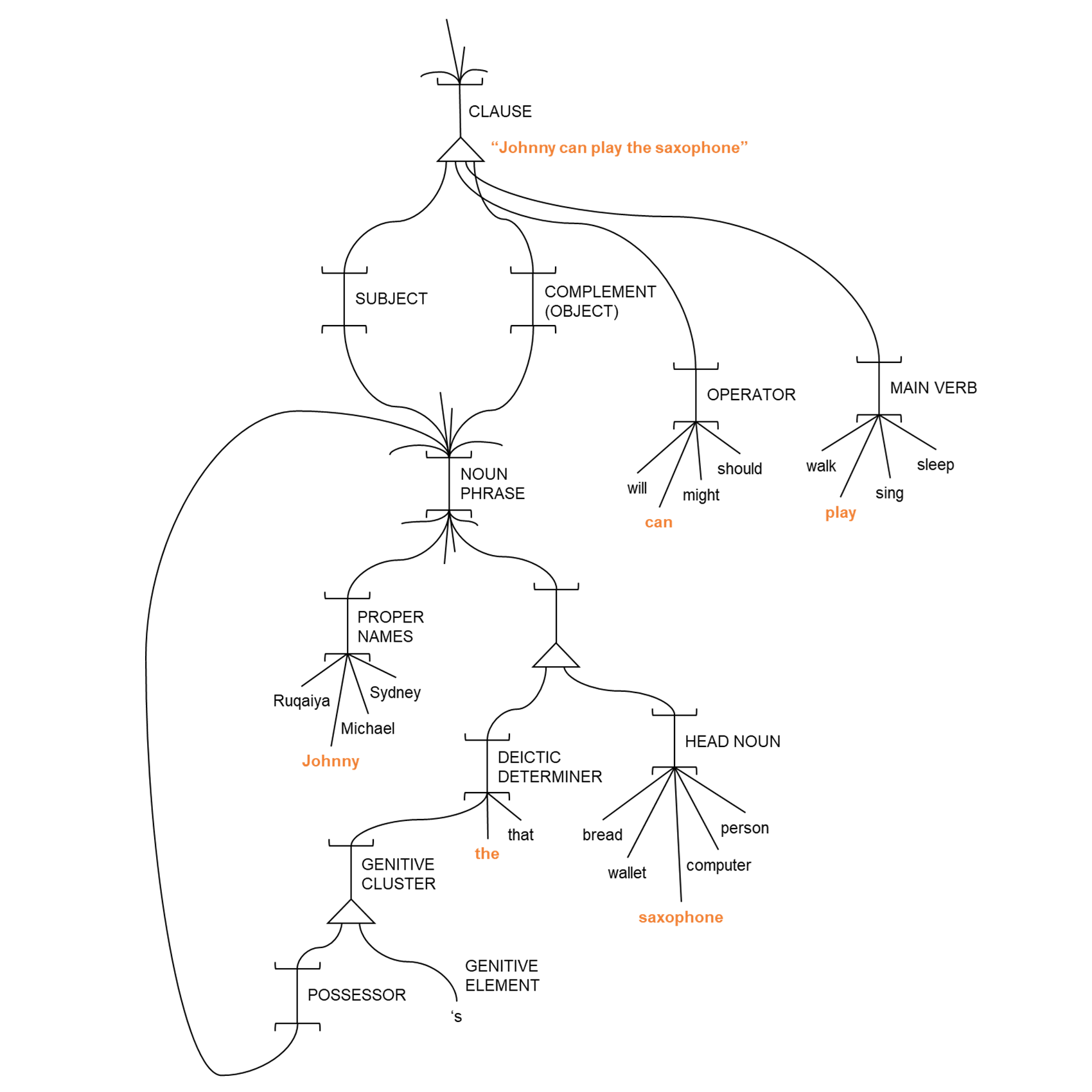
An example of a relational network fragment for producing and comprehending an English clause.

Relational Network Theory (RNT), also known as Neurocognitive Linguistics (NCL) and formerly as Stratificational Linguistics or Cognitive-Stratificational Linguistics, is a connectionist theoretical framework in linguistics primarily developed by Sydney Lamb which aims to integrate theoretical linguistics with neuroanatomy. It views the linguistic system of individual speakers, responsible for language comprehension and production, as consisting of networks of relationships which interconnect across different "strata" (or "levels") of language. These relational networks are hypothesized to correspond to neural maps of cortical columns or minicolumns in the human brain. Consequently, RNT is related to the wider family of cognitive linguistic theories. Furthermore, as a functionalist approach to linguistics, RNT shares a close relationship with Systemic Functional Linguistics (SFL).

== History ==
The origins of Relational Network Theory date to 1957, when Sydney Lamb completed his PhD dissertation on the Uto-Aztecan language Mono. Contrary to prevailing structuralist methods at the time, which stipulated discovery procedures assuming two levels of structure (morphology and phonology), Lamb's dissertation argued that Mono was better described with four strata: the morphemic, allomorphic, morphophonemic, and phonemic. The relationships between the strata were postulated to be realizational, so that morphemes were realized by allomorphs, allomorphs realized by morphophonemes, and morphophonemes by phonemes. He later extended this argument to English in 1958 in a presentation to the Berkeley Linguistics Group. At this stage, Lamb regarded the main innovative insight of his new framework to be the multi-stratified structure of language, hence why "Stratificational Grammar" was initially chosen as the framework's name.

The strata concept continued to be developed by Lamb under the influence of Louis Hjelmslev's glossematics, namely as an extension of Hjelmslev's notion of the linguistic sign as having an "expression plane" and a "content plane". In fall 1964, inspired by a passage from Hjelmslev's Prolegomena to a Theory of Language, Lamb developed the insight that realizational relationships between units of different strata constituted a network, and that the units themselves were nothing but points in the network defined solely by realizational relations with other points.

Also in 1964, Lamb encountered Michael Halliday's system network notation from Systemic Functional Linguistics for the first time. Building on the network insight from Hjelmslev, Lamb made three adaptations to Halliday's notation to create relational network notation: (1) a 90 degree clockwise rotation of the diagrams, (2) the use of a triangle instead of curly brackets to represent conjunctive 'AND' nodes, and (3) the introduction of ordered realization.

The first public presentation of the relational network notation was given a year later in 1965, in a lecture delivered by Lamb at the Linguistic Institute of the University of Michigan. Other linguists in attendance at that lecture included Ronald Langacker, Ruth Brend, and Lamb's students David G. Lockwood and Peter A. Reich. It was also in 1965 that Reich first pointed out to Lamb that his relational networks seemed strikingly similar to neurological networks, though Halliday states that Lamb was already aware of the possibility of relating linguistic theory to actual neural processes as early as 1963.

== Overview ==
RNT suggests that the linguistic system may be analyzed according to separate 'strata', or levels. The strata are ordered hierarchically and, whilst there are no clear-cut boundaries between strata, the elements of each stratum share similar characteristics. For example, a lexical item in the lexicogrammatical stratum is typically a specific sequence of phonemes which connects one or more lexical meanings in the semantic stratum. Several strata are involved in the production of a sound from an initial idea. In linguistic production, each stratum provides actualization or realization for the next lower stratum. Thus, speaking a word would involve a realizational pathway from the semantic stratum to the lexicogrammar, then the phonology, and then the phonetics. The reverse direction is true for linguistic perception and comprehension.

Some commonly posited stratificational units and their strata include:

- The phoneme as the unit on the phonemic stratum.
- The lexeme as the unit on the lexical or lexicogrammatical stratum.
- The morpheme as the unit on the morphemic stratum.
- The sememe as the unit on the semantic stratum.

In contrast to generativist approaches to linguistics, Stratificational Linguistics does not support the notion of an autonomous stratum for syntax. Instead, the term 'lexicogrammar', borrowed from Systemic Functional Linguistics, is preferred because Stratificational Linguistics suggests that syntactic categories are merely labels for classifying different types of lexemes but do not actually play any role in the realization of the lexemes. Rather, it is posited that what is traditionally called 'syntax' is simply the result of what orderings or sequences of lexemes are possible in the lexicogrammatical system of an individual person. In other words, there is no need to posit a separate stratum for syntax to account for syntactic phenomena. It has been further suggested that each lexeme has its own syntactic pattern which determines how it combines with other lexemes, a stance shared with Construction Grammar.

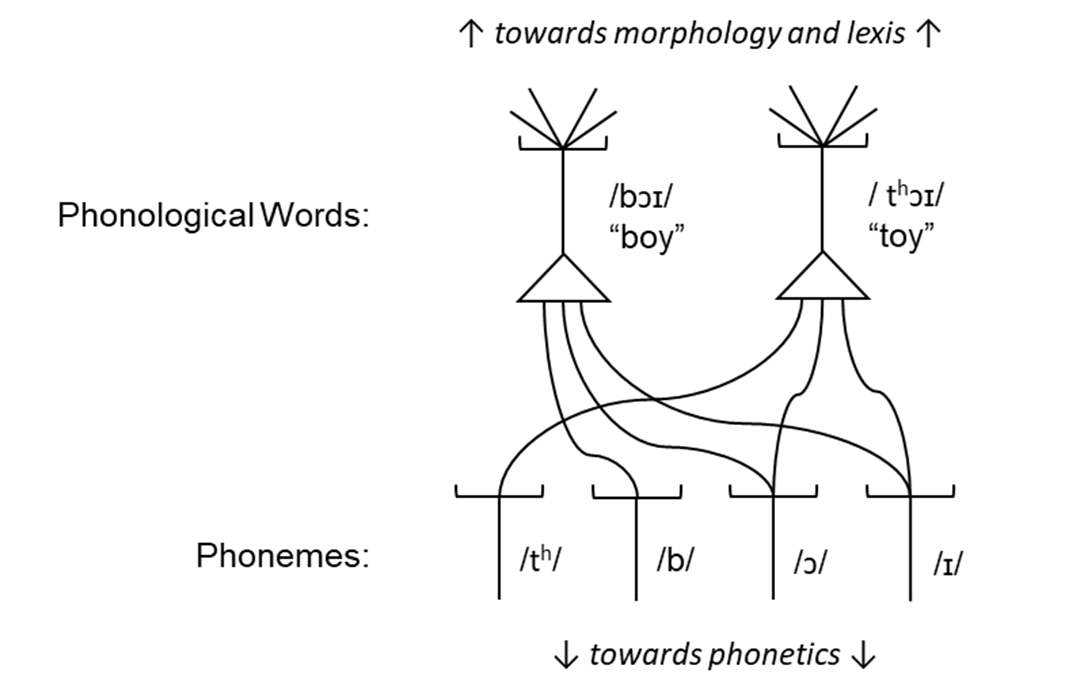
Phonological analysis in Relational Network Theory/Stratificational Grammar.

Linguistic units in RNT are conceptualised as relational networks. Simply put, a linguistic unit at any stratum is defined in relation to other units. For example, the phonemic sequence /bɔɪ/ may be analyzed as a network node which is activated when the nodes for /b/, /ɔ/ and /ɪ/ are also activated. Similarly, the node for the sequence /t^{h}ɔɪ/ gets activated when /t^{h}/, /ɔ/ and /ɪ/ are also activated. The two sequences /bɔɪ/ and /t^{h}ɔɪ/ are defined in relation to the set of phoneme nodes /t^{h}/, /b/, /ɔ/ and /ɪ/, and their relationships can be graphed as a relational network diagram.

== See also ==
- Meaning–text theory
- Neurolinguistics
- Systemic Functional Linguistics
- Construction Grammar
- Word Grammar
- Stratification
