= Functional discourse grammar =

Model of grammar motivated by functions, originally developed by Simon C. Dik.

Functional grammar (FG) and functional discourse grammar (FDG) are grammar models and theories motivated by functional theories of grammar. These theories explain how linguistic utterances are shaped, based on the goals and knowledge of natural language users. In doing so, it contrasts with Chomskyan transformational grammar. Functional discourse grammar has been developed as a successor to functional grammar, attempting to be more psychologically and pragmatically adequate than functional grammar.

The top-level unit of analysis in functional discourse grammar is the discourse move, not the sentence or the clause. This is a principle that sets functional discourse grammar apart from many other linguistic theories, including its predecessor functional grammar.

== History ==
Functional grammar (FG) is a model of grammar motivated by functions, as Simon C. Dik's thesis pointed towards issues with generative grammar and its analysis of coordination back then, and proposed to solve them with a new theory focused on e.g. concepts such as subject and object. The model was originally developed by Simon C. Dik at the University of Amsterdam in the 1970s, and has undergone several revisions since then. The latest standard version under the original name is laid out in the 1997 edition, published shortly after Dik's death. The latest version features the expansion of the model with a pragmatic/interpersonal module by Kees Hengeveld and Lachlan Mackenzie. This has led to a renaming of the theory to functional discourse grammar. This type of grammar is quite distinct from systemic functional grammar as developed by Michael Halliday and many other linguists since the 1970s.

The notion of "function" in FG generalizes the standard distinction of grammatical functions such as subject and object. Constituents (parts of speech) of a linguistic utterance are assigned three types or levels of functions:

1. Semantic function (Agent, Patient, Recipient, etc.), describing the role of participants in states of affairs or actions expressed
2. Syntactic functions (Subject and Object), defining different perspectives in the presentation of a linguistic expression
3. Pragmatic functions (Theme and Tail, Topic and Focus), defining the informational status of constituents, determined by the pragmatic context of the verbal interaction

== Principles of functional discourse grammar ==
There are a number of principles that guide the analysis of natural language utterances according to functional discourse grammar.

Functional discourse grammar explains the phonology, morphosyntax, pragmatics and semantics in one linguistic theory. According to functional discourse grammar, linguistic utterances are built top-down in this order by deciding upon:

1. The pragmatic aspects of the utterance
2. The semantic aspects of the utterance
3. The morphosyntactic aspects of the utterance
4. The phonological aspects of the utterance

According to functional discourse grammar, four components are involved in building up an utterance:

- The conceptual component, which is where the communicative intention that drives the utterance construction arises
- The grammatical component, where the utterance is formulated and encoded according to the communicative intention
- The contextual component, which contains all elements that can be referred to in the history of the discourse or in the environment
- The output component, which realizes the utterance as sound, writing, or signing

The grammatical component consists of four levels:

- The interpersonal level, which accounts for the pragmatics
- The representational level, which accounts for the semantics
- The morphosyntactic level, which accounts for the syntax and morphology
- The phonological level, which accounts for the phonology of the utterance

== Example ==
This example analyzes the utterance "I can't find the red pan. It is not in its usual place." according to functional discourse grammar at the interpersonal level.

At the interpersonal level, this utterance is one discourse move, which consists of two discourse acts, one corresponding to "I can't find the red pan." and another corresponding to "It is not in its usual place."

- The first discourse act consists of:
  - A declarative illocutionary force
  - A speaker, denoted by the word "I"
  - An addressee
  - A communicated content, which consists of:
    - A referential subact corresponding to "I"
    - An ascriptive subact corresponding to "find", which has the function Focus
    - A referential subact corresponding to "the red pan", which contains two ascriptive subacts corresponding to "red" and "pan", and which has the function Topic
- The second discourse act consists of:
  - A declarative illocutionary force
  - A speaker
  - An addressee
  - A communicated content, which consists of:
    - A referential subact corresponding to "it", which has the function Topic
    - An ascriptive subact corresponding to "in its usual place", which has the function Focus
      - Within this subact there is a referential subact corresponding to "its usual place", which consists of:
        - A referential subact corresponding to "its"
        - An ascriptive subact corresponding to "usual"
        - An ascriptive subact corresponding to "place"

Similar analysis, decomposing the utterance into progressively smaller units, is possible at the other levels of the grammatical component.

== See also ==
- Nominal group
- Thematic equative
- Verbal Behavior (book)
