= Mary Macken-Horarik =

Australian linguist

Mary Macken-Horarik is an Australian linguist. She is an adjunct Associate Professor in the Institute for Learning Sciences and Teacher Education (ILSTE) at the Australian Catholic University. This title was awarded "in recognition of her international reputation and scholarly expertise in the field of Senior Secondary English Curriculum." Macken-Horarik is known for her contributions to systemic functional linguistics and its application to literacy, language and English education.

== Biography ==
Born in 1953, Mary Macken-Horarik is the eldest of ten children and she was educated at Catholic schools in Sydney, Australia. She completed her Diploma of Education at the University of New South Wales in 1977. Becoming increasingly interested in linguistics, in 1984, she took up a post as a teacher-linguist in a bilingual school in the remote Aboriginal town of Wadeye in the Northern Territory. In 1987, she completed her Master of Education studies at Deakin University focusing on functional approaches to language and literacy education. Macken-Horarik went on to complete her PhD at the University of Sydney in 1996, under the supervision of James Martin. Her thesis was titled 'Construing the invisible: specialized literacy practices in junior secondary English'.

Since obtaining her PhD degree, Macken-Horarik has worked as a teacher linguist and a teacher educator at several Australian universities. She has been a recipient of two highly prestigious Australian Research Council (ARC) awards, most recently leading a Discovery Research Project investigating the character of a grammatics that is ‘good enough’ for school subject English.

== Contributions to linguistics ==
Macken-Horarik's contributions to linguistics lie in her remarkable ability to move between the specialist fields of systemic functional linguistics and the needs of devoted teachers who have not had time or opportunity to study language formally. In 2009, she joined the advisory committee on the Australian curriculum for English. Following that, between 2010 - 2011, she became chief writer of the Language strand of the Australian Curriculum. Her efforts to make linguistic breakthroughs appliable and accessible to language educators were recognised by the Australian Research Council in 2011 when the project 'Grammar and Praxis: Investigating a Grammatics for 21st Century English' was awarded an ARC grant worth AU$449,951 (Chief investigators: Mary Macken-Horarik, Len Unsworth, and Kristina Love). According to the ARC, this project "will yield vital information about how grammar contributes to development of coherent, cumulative and portable KAL [knowledge about language] at key stages of schooling." The main publication resulting from this project so far is the book titled 'Functional Grammatics: Re-conceptualizing Knowledge about Language and Image for School'. As Frances Christie states in 'Language, context and text', "A grammatics of the kind pursued in his volume offers a great deal to teachers looking for a rewarding and productive model of English language for teaching purposes... Macken-Horarik, Love, Sandiford and Unsworth have made a valuable contribution to English education and to appliable linguistics."

From 2010 to 2016, Macken-Horik also contributed as a researcher, consultant and professional guide to the Secondary Literacy Improvement Program (SLIP) in Melbourne. In Matruglio's words, both the "Grammatics" and "SLIP" projects are of utmost significance as "such research facilitates a sharing of expertise and the development of a common understanding of educational issues between researchers and practitioners."

== Selected publications ==
The majority of Macken-Horarik's research publications explore the relationship between knowledge about language (KAL) and literacy, focusing on the needs of students for whom subject English is an enigma, a problem and a barrier to success in schooling.

=== Book ===
- Macken-Horarik, M., Love, K., Unsworth, L. & Sandiford, C. (2018). Functional Grammatics: Re-conceptualizing knowledge about language and image for school English. London: Routledge.

=== Journal articles and book chapters ===
- Macken-Horarik, M. (2016). Building a metalanguage for interpreting multimodal literature: Insights from systemic functional semiotics in two case study classrooms, English in Australia, 51 (2), 85-99.
- Macken-Horarik, M., Sandiford, C. Love, K. & Unsworth, L. (2015). New ways of working ‘with grammar in mind’ in School English: Insights from systemic functional grammatics, Linguistics and Education, 31, 145-158.
- Unsworth, L. & Macken-Horarik, M. (2015). Interpretive responses to images in picture books by primary and secondary school students: Exploring curriculum expectations of a ‘visual grammatics,’ for English in Education, 49 (1), 56-79.
- Christie, F. & Macken-Horarik, M. (2011). Disciplinarity and School Subject English. In F. Christie & K. Maton (Eds.) Disciplinarity: Functional Linguistic and Sociological Perspectives. London: Continuum, pp. 175–196.
