= Lexicogrammar =

Lexicogrammar is a term directly related to systemic functional linguistics. Systemic functional linguistics is a specific approach to adding as much detail as possible when describing lexicogrammar. Michael Halliday, the father of systemic functional linguistics, coined the word "lexicogrammar" to express the continuity between grammar and lexis. For many linguists, these phenomena are discrete. But Halliday brings them together with this term. As with other dimensions of Halliday's theory, he describes the relation of grammar to lexis as one of a 'cline', and therefore, one of 'delicacy'. In 1961, he wrote 'The grammarian's dream is...to turn the whole of linguistic form into grammar, hoping to show that lexis can be defined as "most delicate grammar". In 1987, Ruqaiya Hasan wrote an article titled 'The grammarian's dream: lexis as delicate grammar', in which she laid out a methodology for mapping lexis in Halliday's terms.

Simply put, lexicogrammar is the grammar of the lexicon. Lexicogrammar derives from the idea that "vocabulary and grammatical structures are interdependent," and therefore the grammatical structures of lexis is what the systemic functional linguistics approach analyzes. Lexicogrammar does not equally pay attention to lexis as it does to grammar. It is more than anything a specific type of grammar that focuses on lexis.

== See also ==
- Lexis (linguistics)
- Systemic functional grammar
