= Elementary writing =

Early development of young writers

Elementary writing is a term used to describe the early development of young writers.

== Development of early writing ==
The development of early writing is crucial to encouraging later interest and engagement in young writers. The current standard curriculum often focuses on penmanship and prescriptive grammar, but some have suggested that this may discourage early writers. Young writers are the new authors and storytellers of the upcoming generations, so the development of their writing at a young age is crucial. Research and statistics have highlighted significant trends in literacy development. Data from the National Assessment of Educational Progress (NAEP) shows that between 2009 and 2019, reading and comprehension test scores have decreased in grades 4, 8, and 12 in the United States. This trend suggests the curriculum that is being taught in school to early writers may need to be adjusted to maximize the potential of young writers and address the disengagement the younger generations have in their writing courses.

Research in writing studies shows that elementary students improve their writing when they are directly taught how different types of academic writing are structured. Studies in upper elementary classrooms have found that when teachers explicitly explain and model genres like reports or scientific explanations, students are able to write in a more organized and clear way.Genre-based instruction, which is often connected to systemic functional linguistics (SFL), focuses on making the structure and language of academic writing more visible to students instead of expecting them to figure it out on their own. Classroom research suggests that when students practice writing through modeling, guided activities, and breaking down example texts, they develop stronger writing skills across different subjects. Research on English language learners (ELLs) also shows that students benefit from instruction that gives more support with language and structure, helping them move from basic writing to more complex academic writing over time.

== Classroom application ==
Students benefit the most when teachers clearly model the writing process through drafting, revising, and editing activities. Reading and writing function cohesively during the early stages of developing writing skills. Writing to read strategies can be applied in the classroom through peer review and mixed literacy assignments. The effectiveness of these in-class strategies continues to be reinforced, showing that giving students opportunities to practice writing continues to help them develop skills over time. Methods such as these help students view writing as a process, rather than simply focusing on grammar and correctness. In addition, classroom writing activities benefit executive function skills such as planning, organization, and memory: all crucial to children's development. Another key tactic in elementary writing is urging students to write about personal experiences and interests. For younger writers, writing about themselves increases engagement and confidence.

== AI ==
In Rebecca Rolloff's article, Rolloff talks about how educators should teach young students the creative aspect of writing, rather than going into the structural aspect of writing, which could still tie into the impact of AI. If the modern curriculum does not allow students to be creative in their writing, it causes them to be susceptible to using artificial intelligence to write their pieces for them. If the curriculum is stricter, it is easier for young writers to copy and paste the same format into an AI engine, which would hinder the growth of early writers. The main purpose of this movement is to help the young generation of students become confident and well-skilled writers, without the feeling that writing is too difficult to comprehend. It's purpose is to also take away the notion that writing is something that someone is "good at." It is important to the future of the writing community that there is a prioritization of the process of a progressive growth in writing, rather than expecting students and young writers to immediately know how to properly construct a well-written piece of writing.

== History ==
Historically, teaching young children to write focused on penmanship and spelling, which is not a foundation of writing development. Students would advance into the next grade unprepared with the challenges of another level of writing. Students would finish preschool and advance to elementary school unprepared and overwhelmed, leading to students lacking the motivation and guidance to become successful with their writing. Feeling as if their writing is considered "not good enough" for the grade can be discouraging. However, if the progression of early writers started in preschool, then students would feel more confident when more significant challenges arise. In the early 20th century, teachers emphasized the importance of legibility and speed with writing. During the mid-20th century, they started to focus on composition, however, they would use established literary models for structure and grammar, which can be useful to help see what writing is supposed to look like. Nonetheless, it could be potentially discouraging because students may think their writing is not "good enough" if it isn't exactly like the example. Introducing a new model emphasizes the early development of a young writer, allowing them to focus on their creativity as a writer. What is seen in the new model of writing is: teaching the creative aspects of writing by allowing young writers (those in preschool to 1st grade) to write what interests them, whether it be a game they are playing at home, details of their day, or something similar. This method could get them excited about writing, because they are writing something that isn't structured and is focused on their passions. A common thought would be that the outcome of this is once young students get comfortable with writing, adding on the other aspects and fundamentals of writing could be more efficient. This idea came up because research has shown that some students would go from one grade to another still behind and unsure of what they are doing because the grade before wasn't preparing them enough for the challenges that followed.

== Common Core ==
Elementary writing instruction in the United States has increasingly been shaped by the implementation of Common Core state standards launched in 2010. Common Core led to a stronger emphasis on evidence-based and argumentative writing, which encouraged students to support their ideas with details and textual evidence. These shifts in classroom instruction have led many teachers to move toward more structured and analytical writing activities that align with the new standards and assessments. Due to Common Core, standardized testing practices changed, often focusing more heavily on reading analysis and written responses connected to texts. Under Common Core standards, strategies such as goal-setting, planning, collaboration, and feedback can improve students' writing development and overall writing quality. However, although expectations for student writing increased, the amount of time in the classroom devoted specifically to writing instruction has decreased over time.

== Creative writing ==
Creative writing in elementary school focuses on teaching narrative structures and descriptive vocabulary to improve creative thinking. Methods that focus on writing as a form of art rather than writing drills supports students being able to develop their own writing styles. A 2019 study showed that teaching students creative writing improved students' overall attitude toward writing. The research used creative writing activities, such as writing from word pools, after which students' writing achievement scores increased. A 2026 study using self determination theory concluded that teachers using strict writing prompts led to students being bored and stressed. The data from the study indicated that allowing students to choose their own topic based on their passions reduces the anxiety from the task. A three year long study found that when elementary students from disadvantaged backgrounds took part in daily 20-minute creative writing workshops, it improved their ability to generate original ideas and increased verbal fluency. Research suggests that teachers observed improvements in students' English writing skills when combining brainstorming and free writing methods with teacher feedback.

== Technology ==
Technology has become an integral part of elementary writing as various standards, such as the Common Core, push for the use of digital tools and resources for assignments. The use of technology within writing instruction has a moderate effect on writing quality and a strong effect on writing quantity within elementary students. These improvements in performance are attributed to various technological devices, such as tablets, that allow for students to move from knowledge telling to knowledge transformation. While less experienced writers usually engage in knowledge telling through retrieving and listing information from memory, knowledge transformation requires that writers use a more elevated problem-solving approach to address specific goals through their writing, such as genre or appealing to certain audiences. The use of digital tools allow students to move beyond simply retrieving information to engaging in meaningful writing composition.

One of the main benefits of technology is a reduction in the cognitive load within the writing process. The physical act of handwriting and spelling can often be exhausting for the working memory and impact the composition quality, especially for young writers and English Language Learners (ELLs). These constraints can be bypassed through technological tools such as using Speech-to-Text (STT) software which results in the improvement of holistic text quality and fluency. For example, ELLs are able to dictate their ideas well through STT, allowing their writing to keep up with their thoughts while avoiding those ideas being forgotten due to the mental effort required to manually transcribe their writing. Moreover, giving students structured time to conduct research on the Internet in the prewriting phase has proven to result in the improvement of total essay scores and mechanics by assisting with information recall.

On the other hand, technology can have negative implications and limitations for writers. Online writing environments may place strong demands on a student's digital literacy. If students fall short on these skills, it may lead to a decrease in writing quality and poor time management. Furthermore, Automatic Writing Evaluation (AWE) systems can sometimes provide vague feedback that students may struggle to understand. Additionally, more experienced writers may find AWE systems to be less useful as the feedback provided may not properly address higher-level writing skills. Another limitation can be found within STT software as it may produce lower transcription accuracy when used by students with strong accents, leading to frustration for students. Moreover, despite the availability of technology and digital tools within the classroom, they are often underutilised. Finally, a major concern surrounding technology is that digital instruction may encourage students to use artificial intelligence to complete their assignments, which may hinder their own creativity.

== Integrated Literacy Frameworks ==
Integrated literacy frameworks in elementary classrooms use a variety of teaching strategies and tools to support students' writing development. Digital technology, including 1:1 iPad programs, can help teachers adapt instruction for students with different needs while also expanding how literacy is taught across different subjects. Students may combine digital tools with traditional materials to create “mashups” of printed and digital work that communicate their ideas in creative ways. In specialized subjects like science, teachers may use genre-based instruction to guide students through specific types of writing, such as procedural recounts. This type of structured support is especially helpful for English language learners. For students with disabilities, explicit writing-organization strategies are beneficial to teaching how their writing can be clear and understandable. These organizational techniques are frequently taught in small-group settings to make the general writing curriculum more accessible. Similarly, guided reading uses small-group instruction based on reading levels to support literacy development. Teachers can then adjust the instruction and materials to better meet the needs of each group. Regular collections of writing samples can help teachers determine whether these supports are connected to the classroom curriculum and are appropriate for each student. Unlike standardized multiple-choice tests, writing samples provide a more realistic picture of a student’s actual writing abilities.
