= Trinocular perspective =

A trinocular perspective is an analytical tool in Systemic functional linguistics. Michael Halliday introduced the term using a cartographic hierarchy of stratification whereby three viewpoints were identified:

- "from above" (from a higher stratum)
- "from roundabout" (from its own stratum, its own primary location)
- "from below"(from a lower stratum)

Halliday's colleague, C. M. I. M. Matthiessen has suggested that the approach could be used with other global semiotic dimensions, specifying:

- the cline of instantiation
- the spectrum of metafunction
- the hierarchy of rank
- the hierarchy of axis

== See also ==
- Trinocular vision
