= Cline of instantiation =

Concept in systemic functional linguistics

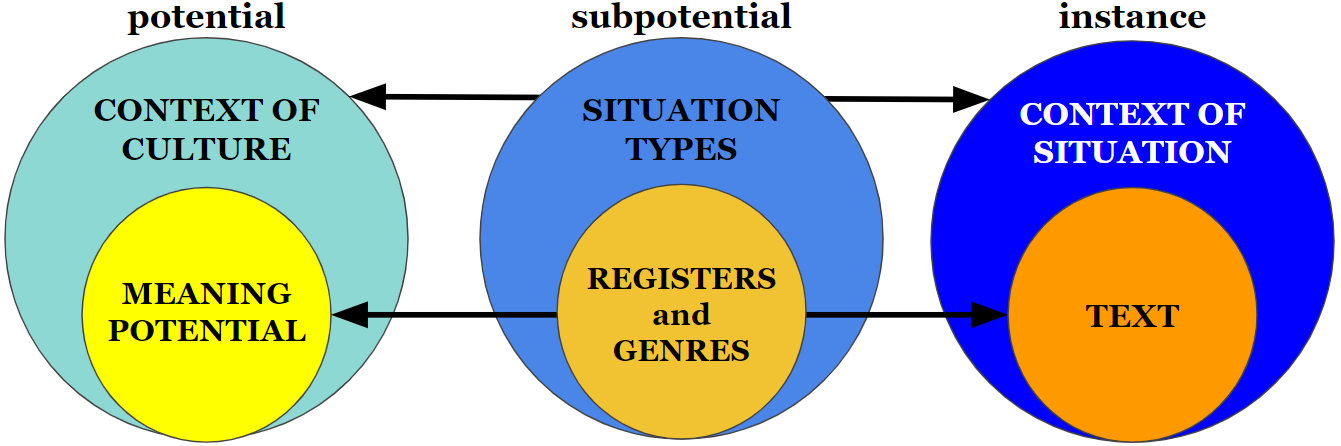
Pictorial representation of the cline of instantiation.

A cline of instantiation is a concept in systemic functional linguistics theory. Alongside stratification and metafunction, it is one of the global semiotic dimensions that define the organization of language in context.

According to Michael Halliday, instantiation is "the relation between an instance and the system that lies behind it". It is "based on memory and is a feature of all systemic behaviour".

The cline of instantiation has two poles. At one end is "instance"; at the other is the "system", the whole potential to which the instance relates. In the study of language and other phenomena, including other semiotic phenomena, what can be observed is an instance of an underlying potential.

Halliday borrows the distinction between "weather" and "climate" to explain the relation. The weather can be observed day by day; over time, a picture of a climate is built up. Weather and climate are not distinct phenomena but different perspectives on the same phenomenon.

The notion of "cline of instantiation" reconciles the distinction between "langue" and "parole", made by Ferdinand de Saussure—a separation adapted by Noam Chomsky, who reconceptualized "langue" and "parole" from social constructs (language as collective) to the individual psychological constructs of "competence" and "performance" (language as genetic). Halliday suggests that this dichotomy has done considerable harm to linguistics as a discipline.

Halliday follows Louis Hjelmslev (1899–1965) in seeing linguistics as the study of both instances of language and the linguistic system. Halliday argues that linguists must take both into account: "For a linguist, to describe language without accounting for text is sterile; to describe text without relating it to the system is vacuous".
