= Leila Barbara =

Brazilian linguist

Leila Barbara (April 9, 1938 – June 2, 2024) was a Brazilian linguist known for her work in applied linguistics and systemic functional linguistics, of which she was considered a pioneer in Brazil.

== Biography ==
Barbara was born in 1938. She attended the Pontifical Catholic University of São Paulo (PUC-SP), graduating with a degree in Anglo-Germanic literature in 1960 and a doctorate in English in 1971.

Beginning in 1965, she was a longtime professor at PUC-SP, where she helped found the school's applied linguistics program. She worked in various areas of linguistics, particularly systemic functional linguistics, with an emphasis on Brazilian Portuguese, though she also studied English and Spanish. She served as dean of the university from 1988 to 1992.

Barbara died in 2024, in São Paulo.

== Selected works ==
=== Books ===
- Sintaxe transformacional do modo verbal (1975)
- Reflections on Language Learning (edited with Mike Scott, 1994)
- Reflexão e Ações no Ensino-Aprendizagem de Línguas (organized with Rosinda de Castro Guerra Ramos, 2003)
- Textos e Linguagem acadêmica: explorações sistêmico-funcionais em espanhol e português (organized with Estela Moyano)
- Estudos e pesquisas em Linguística Sistêmico-Funcional (organized with Adail Sebastião Rodrigues-Júnior and Giovanna Hoy)

=== Articles and chapters ===
- "A Survey of Communication Patterns in the Brazilian Business Context" (with M. Antonieta A. Celani, Heloisa Collins e Mike Scott, 1996)
- "Homing in on a genre: invitations for bids" (with Mike Scott, 1999)
- "It is not there, but [it] is cohesive: the case of pronominal ellipsis of subject in Portuguese" (with Carlos A. M. Gouveia, 2001)
- "Marked or unmarked, that is not the question. The question is: where's the theme?" (with Carlos A. M. Gouveia, 2004)
- "Linguística Sistêmico-Funcional para a Análise de Discurso: um panorama introdutório" (with Célia de Macêdo, 2009)
- "A representação de Dilma Rousseff pela mídia impressa brasileira: analisando os processos verbais" (with Maria Carmen Aires Gomes, 2010)
- "Engajamento na perspectiva linguística sistêmico-funcional em trabalhos de conclusão de curso de Letras" (with Maria Otília Ninin, 2013)
