= Trinocular vision =

Trinocular vision may refer to:

- Animals with a rudimentary third eye:
  - The parietal eye present in some amphibians and reptiles.
  - The ocelli that occur in many arthropods.
- A compound eye with three independent regions, such as that of the mantis shrimp.

== See also ==
- Third eye (disambiguation)
- Binocular vision
- Monocular vision
- Trinocular perspective
