= Mary J. Schleppegrell =

Applied linguist (born 1950)

- Born: October 17, 1950 (age 76)
- Occupation: Professor of Education
- Awards: Leadership Through Research Award, American Educational Research Association (2018)

Academic background
- Education: Georgetown University (Ph.D.); American University in Cairo; University of Minnesota

Academic work
- Institutions: University of Michigan School of Education

Mary J. Schleppegrell (born October 17, 1950) is an applied linguist and Professor of Education at the University of Michigan. Her research and praxis are based on the principles of Systemic Functional Linguistics (SFL), a theory derived from the work of social semiotic linguist Michael Halliday. Schleppegrell is known for the SFL-based literacy practices she has continuously helped to develop for multilingual and English language learners throughout her decades long career, which she began as an educational specialist before transitioning to the field of applied linguistics. As a result, her publications demonstrate a deep understanding of both the theories and practices related to teaching and learning.

Schleppegrell believes that academic success after the elementary years is closely tied to explicit instruction with regard to the acquisition of academic language. Consequently, she maintains that students should be taught to "unpack" meanings encoded in authentic academic texts of different genres rather than be provided with easier, teacher-modified versions of these texts stating that, "you can't really make it simpler and still maintain the level of content. You have to amplify instruction around it."

== Awards ==
Schleppegrell received the 2018 Leadership Through Research Award from the Second Language Research Special Interest Group (SIG) of the American Educational Research Association.

== Education ==
Schleppegrell received a B.A. in German from the University of Minnesota in 1972 and began her career as an elementary school teacher in California's Elk Grove School District. In 1982, she completed an M.A. in Teaching English as a Foreign Language at the American University in Cairo and subsequently taught at the university level in Egypt before returning to the United States where she earned a Ph.D. in Linguistics from Georgetown University in 1989. Schleppegrell's dissertation entitled, "Functions of because in spoken discourse" demonstrates a return to her early career interests as interviews of elementary school students formed the corpus of her research data.

== Career ==
After completing her Ph.D., Schleppegrell joined the faculty of the Linguistics department of University of California, Davis, where she would remain until 2005. During this time, she published the first edition of The Language of Schooling: A Functional Linguistics Perspective, a text that advocates for incorporating language-focused instruction into the curriculum of all academic subjects beginning at the middle school level in an effort to support and develop learners' critical literacy skills.

In 2005, Schleppegrell became a Professor of Education at the University of Michigan, where she currently teaches courses on language learning and development, linguistics in education, and SFL. After joining the faculty at the University of Michigan, Schleppegrell published Reading in Secondary Content Areas: A Language-Based Pedagogy with Luciana de Oliveira and Focus on Grammar and Meaning with Zhihui Fang, two books that offer both theoretical explanations and practical approaches for the development of critical literacy in a K-12 setting.

In addition to her work as both a professor and researcher, Schleppeggrell served as the President of the North American Systemic Functional Linguistics Association (NASFLA) from 2010-2011.

== Research ==
With the publication of her first book, The Language of Schooling, Schleppegrell made an important contribution to the literature on language use in educational contexts. Published in 2004, this book was a timely response to Lily Wong Fillmore and Catherine E. Snow's 2002 suggestion that researchers provide teachers with more explicit knowledge about academic language. Departing from a SFL perspective, Schleppegrell deftly analyzes the different genres of language students encounter in academic settings in order to draw attention to the idea that everyday, spoken discourse differs drastically from the language of academic texts. She contends that students who do not encounter academic language outside of a school setting are considerably less likely to succeed in secondary and tertiary courses as they require advanced literacy skills. In response to this problem, Schleppegrell advocates for explicit language instruction across all academic subjects that provides students with an understanding of how texts create meaning through a combination genre-related conventions and linguistic choices made by the author or speaker.

Schleppegrell and Zhihui Fang authored Reading in secondary content areas: A language-based pedagogy, a functional linguistics-based textbook that aims to provide teachers with practical tools for addressing the literacy crisis currently being faced by English language learners in the United States, only 4% of whom are considered to be reading at grade level before entering high school. Fang and Schleppegrell discuss the idea of providing students with a functional metalanguage in order to improve their interpretation and production of academic language.

Together with Luciana C. de Oliveira, Schleppegrell continued her previous work on functional metalanguage with respect to second language learning in Focus on grammar and meaning.

== Books ==
- De Oliviera, L. C., & Schleppegrell, M. J. (2015). Focus on grammar and meaning. Oxford University Press.
- Fang, Z. & Schleppegrell, M. J. (2011). Reading in secondary content areas: A language-based pedagogy. The University of Michigan Press. ISBN 978-0472032792
- Schleppegrell, M. J. (2004). The language of schooling: A functional linguistics perspective. Routledge.

== Representative articles ==
- Schleppegrell, M. J. (2016). Content-based language teaching with functional grammar in the elementary school. Language Teaching, 49(1), 116–128.
- Schleppegrell, M. J. (2012). Academic Language in Teaching and Learning: Introduction to the Special Issue. The Elementary School Journal, 112(3), 409–418.
- Schleppegrell, M. J. (2007) The Linguistic Challenges of Mathematics Teaching and Learning: A Research Review, Reading & Writing Quarterly, 23:2, 139-159.
- Schleppegrell, M. J., Achugar M, & Oteiza T. (2004). The Grammar of History: Enhancing Content-Based Instruction Through a Functional Focus on Language. TESOL Quarterly, 38(1), 67–93.
- Schleppegrell, M. J. (2001). Linguistic features of the language of schooling. Linguistics and Education 12 (4), 431-459.

== Grants ==
- In 2017, Schleppegrell and other colleagues were awarded $2.5 million by the James S. McDonnell Foundation. The grant, entitled, "Teachers Learning to Facilitate Communication and Reasoning Through Inquiry with History and Social Science Sources" focuses on Inquiry Teaching (IT) professional development for middle school social studies instructors. Schleppegrell and her colleagues study how teachers modify their instructional practices after completing the social studies-oriented IT training developed by the research team.
- In 2010, Schleppegrell received a grant for approximately $1.4 million from the Institute of Education Sciences. The purpose of the study entitled, "The Iterative Development of Modules to Support Teachers' Engagement in Exploring Language and Meaning in Text with English Language Learners" was to research, develop, and implement five professional development modules for teachers of elementary school age English language learners. The modules aimed at providing these teachers with practical strategies for drawing learners' attention not only to textual content but to the linguistic choices that informed the organization of the texts to be studied.
