= Ruqaiya Hasan =

Indian linguist (1931–2015)

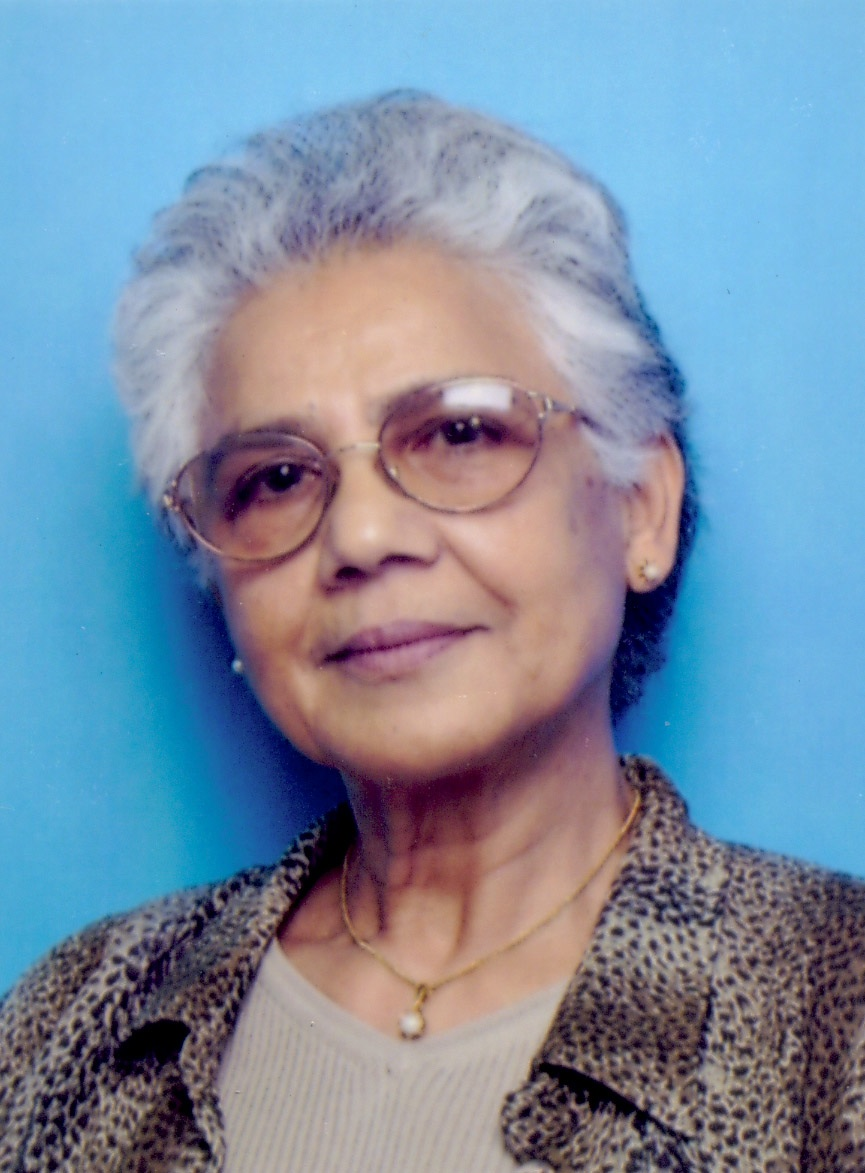
- Ruqaiya Hasan
- Born: 3 July 1931; Pratapgarh, Uttar Pradesh, British India
- Died: 24 June 2015 (aged 83); Sydney, New South Wales, Australia
- Known for: Semantic variation; context in linguistic theory; "Symbolic articulation"
- Spouse: Michael Halliday

Ruqaiya Hasan (3 July 1931 (Note: After government birth records were lost in Pratapgarh, Hasan's mother re-registered Ruqaiya's birthdate as 3 July 1931, slightly earlier than her real birthdate, to enroll her in school earlier.) – 24 June 2015) was an Indian linguist and professor who held visiting positions and taught at various universities in England and Australia. Her last appointment was at Macquarie University in Sydney, from which she retired as emeritus professor in 1994. Throughout her career she researched and published widely in the areas of verbal art, culture, context and text, text and texture, lexicogrammar and semantic variation. The latter involved the devising of extensive semantic system networks for the analysis of meaning in naturally occurring dialogues.

== Biography ==
In 1964 Hasan completed her PhD in linguistics at the University of Edinburgh. The title of her thesis was 'A Linguistic Study of Contrasting Features in the Style of Two Contemporary English Prose Writers'. The writers were Angus Wilson and William Golding. She drew on Halliday's early work, in particular, his "Categories of the Theory of Grammar" paper, which had been published in 1961.

== Contributions to linguistics ==
Hasan worked in her career of more than 50 years in linguistics around a number of central concerns, but all have set out from a basic conviction concerning the "continuity from the living of life right down to the morpheme".

Her early PhD research began a long interest in language and verbal art. In the 1960s she worked at the Sociolinguistic Research Centre with Basil Bernstein, on issues concerning the relation of language and the distribution of forms of consciousness. This engagement spawned both her later work on semantic variation, and provided the impetus and data for her early studies of what underpins text unity—in her terms, texture and text structure. In 1976, she published with MAK Halliday what remains the most comprehensive analysis of cohesion in English. In their further co-authored book, Language Context and Text: Aspects of Language in a Social-Semiotic Perspective, Hasan set out the interrelationships of texture and text structure (i.e. her notion of "generic structure potential", or "GSP").

She divided linguistic theories into two categories: "externalist" and "internalist". She applied the term "externalist" to those theories where language is assigned a "subsidiary role" in the creation of meaning. In such theories, language plays no role in bringing about the existence of the thing to be understood or expressed. In the externalist approach, "language is reduced to a name device: it becomes a set of 'names' that label pre-existing things, properties, events, actions, and so on. It is a condition of naming that the phenomena should exist and be recognisable as having specific identities quite independent of the 'names' that the speakers of the language choose to give them." She urged linguists to abandon the externalist view, arguing instead for a linguistic model "that is capable of doing two seemingly disparate things at once: first, we need to show that meanings are the very artefact of language and so are internal to it; and secondly, that these linguistically created meanings nonetheless pertain to our experience of the world around us and inside us".

== Studies in context ==
Hasan followed but extended the model of linguistic context set out by Michael Halliday going back to the 1960s, in which he proposed that linguistic context must be seen as a "semiotic construct" with three essential parameters: field, tenor and mode. Hasan argued that context is essential to resolving Saussure's dichotomy of 'langue' and 'parole'.
Hasan made a theoretical distinction between "relevant context" [aspects of context encapsulated in the text], and what she called in 1973 the 'material situational setting'. 'Relevant context' she defines as "that frame of consistency which is illuminated by the language of text" and "a semiotic construct". Since relevant context is a "semiotic construct", she argued that it should be "within the descriptive orbit of linguistics". Further, since systemic functional linguistics is a social semiotic theory of language, then it is incumbent on linguists in this tradition to "throw light on this construct".

Hasan critiqued the typical application of Halliday's terms "field", "tenor" and "mode" by systemic linguists, on the basis that the terms have been applied as if their meaning and place in the theory was self-evident. She argued for the application of the system network as a mechanism for the systematic description of the regularities across diverse social contexts.

== Studies in semantic variation ==
Ruqaiya Hasan. 2009. Semantic Variation: Meaning in Society and Sociolinguistics. London: Equinox

While working at Macquarie University in Sydney, Hasan undertook 10 years of research into the role of everyday language in the formation of children's orientation to social context. She adopted the term semantic variation to describe her findings from this research, a term first coined by Labov and Weiner. Having proposed the concept, the authors explicitly rejected the possibility of semantic variation as a sociolinguistic concept, except as possibility a function of age.

Hasan's work was an empirical investigation of semantic variation. Her findings represent linguistic correlates of Basil Bernstein's conception of "coding orientation". Hasan collected some 100 hours of naturally occurring discourse in families across distinct social locations. She used the terms higher-autonomy professional and lower-autonomy professional to distinguish social locations, the latter describing professionals who have discretion over the way their working time is organized, as distinct from those whose time is at the discretion of others higher up in a workplace hierarchy. The findings are set out in Hasan 2009, the second volume of her collected papers. Of this work on semantic variation, Jay Lemke, adjunct professor of communication at the University of California, writes:

The results of this work were at least twofold. First, it established in great detail and with high statistical significance that across social class lines there were major differences in how mothers and young children from working class vs middle class families framed questions and answers, commands and requests, and grounds and reasons in casual conversation in normal settings. And second, it showed that the usual mode of teachers’ talk with these children was if anything an exaggerated version of the typical middle-class ways of meaning.
The theoretical significance goes well beyond even these important results. Educationally, and in terms of social policy, it faces us with the truth of Basil Bernstein's hypothesis of many years ago that ways of meaning differ significantly across social class positions, and that home and school, functioning as critical settings for socialization, tend to inculcate these ways of meaning and then evaluate and classify them in ways that lead to or at least significantly support the realities of social class differentiation and hierarchization in modern societies (Bernstein, 1971). Linguistically and sociologically, Hasan argues from her data, variation in meaning making must be considered an integral if not the primary factor in our understanding of the role of language in the constitution of social structure."

== Studies in verbal art ==
Hasan's studies of verbal art are a linguistic extension of the Prague School, and in particular the work of Jan Mukařovský. According to Hasan, of the Prague School linguists Mukařovský has produced "the most coherent view of the nature of verbal art and its relation to language". Mukařovský argued that poetic language cannot be characterised by reference to a single property of language. The aesthetic function is instead a mode of using the properties of language. From Mukařovský, Hasan took the notion of foregrounding.

The process of foregrounding, or making salient, depends on contrast: an aspect of the text's language, or a set of textual features, can only be foregrounded against a patterning which becomes the ‘background’. This is the notion of a figure and ground relationship. Foregrounding, for Hasan, is contrast with respect to the norms of the text. However the idea of contrast is not self-evident. We need to be able to specify under what conditions a pattern in language is significant such that we consider it to be foregrounded, and, therefore, can attribute to it some of the responsibilities for conveying the text's deeper meanings.

A pattern draws attention to itself, i.e. is foregrounded, when it displays consistency. There are two aspects to this consistency: consistency in terms of its "semantic drift" (Butt 1983) and consistency in terms of its textual location. Semantic drift refers to the manner in which an ensemble of features take the reader toward “the same general kind of meaning” (Hasan, 1985a: 95). Consistency of textual location refers not to any gross notion of location, such as every other paragraph or every five lines. Rather, consistency of textual location refers to “some significant point in the organisation of the text as a unity” (ibid: 96). The process of attending to the foregrounded patterns in the text is the means by which we proceed from simple statements about the language to an explication of the ‘artness’ of the text.

Ultimately, Hasan describes the patterning of language patterns as 'symbolic articulation'. 'Symbolic articulation' is the means by which a process of "second-order semiosis" emerges, that is the process by which "one order of meaning acts as metaphor for a second order of meaning”.

== Selected works ==
- Hasan, Ruqaiya. 1996. Ways of Saying: Ways of Meaning. Selected Papers of Ruqaiya Hasan, eds. C. Cloran, D. Butt & G. Williams. London: Cassell.
- Hasan, Ruqaiya. 2005. Language, Society and Consciousness. Collected Works of Ruqaiya Hasan, Vol. 1, ed. J. Webster. London: Equinox.
- Hasan, Ruqaiya. 2009. Semantic Variation: Meaning in Society and Sociolinguistics. Collected Works of Ruqaiya Hasan, Vol. 2, ed. J. Webster. London: Equinox.
- Hasan, Ruqaiya. 2011. Language and Education: Learning and Teaching in Society. Collected Works of Ruqaiya Hasan, Vol. 3, ed. J. Webster. London: Equinox.
- Hasan, Ruqaiya. 2016. Context in the System and Process of Language. Collected Works of Ruqaiya Hasan, Vol. 4, ed. J. Webster. London: Equinox.
- Hasan, Ruqaiya. 2019. Describing Language: Form and Function. Collected Works of Ruqaiya Hasan, Vol. 5, ed. J. Webster. London: Equinox.
- Hasan, Ruqaiya. 2017. Unity in Discourse: Texture and Structure. Collected Works of Ruqaiya Hasan, Vol. 6, ed. J. Webster. London: Equinox.
- Hasan, Ruqaiya. forthcoming. Verbal Art: A Social Semiotic Perspective. Collected Works of Ruqaiya Hasan, Vol. 7, ed. J. Webster. London: Equinox.

== See also ==
- Metafunction
