= Cremorne Girls High School =

- Cremorne, New South Wales; Australia

Information
- Type: Public, single-sex, secondary school
- Motto: Latin: Optima Optime (The best possible things in the best possible way)
- Established: 1927 (NBGIHS); January 1941 (NBGJHS); April 1952 (CGHS)
- Status: Closed
- Closed: 1987
- Sister school: Crows Nest Boys High School
- Principal: Lorna Collin (1973–1985); Ruth Readford (1985–1987)
- Campus: 53–57 Murdoch Street
- Colours: Royal blue and white

Cremorne Girls High School, (abbreviation CGHS) is a former high school located on Murdoch Street in the Sydney suburb of Cremorne, New South Wales, Australia. It was a girls high school operated by the New South Wales Department of Education with students from years 7 to 12. The school was first established in 1927 as Neutral Bay Girls Intermediate High School. However, due to declining enrolments the school was declared surplus to the needs of the department and officially closed in 1987. The school and its heritage-listed buildings are now a satellite campus of Redlands.

== History ==
The school was first established in 1927 as Neutral Bay Girls Intermediate High School, but traced its history back to the establishment of the Neutral Bay Public School in 1886. However, within a few years, the buildings on the site on Murdoch Street, Cremorne, were considered to be inadequate. The foundation stone of the new main building was laid by Minister for Education David Drummond on 6 October 1934 in the presence of the Mayor of North Sydney, Ald. Hodgson, who noted that the "new building had been long needed, as the conditions for staff and scholars at the old school were deplorable". A year later the buildings, which contained seven classrooms, an assembly hall, science room, preparation room, and staff rooms erected at a cost of £8079, were completed and were opened by the local Member for Neutral Bay, Reginald Weaver, on 6 July 1935. In January 1941 the school was upgraded in status and became known as Neutral Bay Girls Junior High School, which continued until April 1952 when the school was renamed as Cremorne Girls High School.

=== Closure ===
Enrolments had been declining at the school since 1947 and by 1985 enrolments stood at 380. As a consequence, the Minister for Education Rodney Cavalier, made an announcement on 1 July 1985 that the school was economically and educationally unviable and would be closed (alongside Ryde and Wilkins high schools) by 1987, with no year 7 intake for 1986 and the remaining students transferred to Mosman High School or Willoughby Girls High School. As a result, a concerted campaign was started by the students and staff of the school with the local community to save the school: over 300 girls marches across the Harbour Bridge on 21 August in protest, a small delegation later met with the minister and a community organisation was formed, known as the 'Save Cremorne Action Committee'. These efforts were ultimately unsuccessful and during the lead up to the closure in mid-1987, the final Principal of the school, Ruth Readford, noted that "There are too few students in this part of the metropolis. Or, to put it another way, there are too many schools, both State and Private."

Despite various calls to keep the school site in public hands, by 1989 the Minister for Administrative Services, Robert Webster, put the site up for sale by public tender. The site was subsequently purchased by SCEGGS Redlands to be transformed into their new senior campus. In 1989, the 1934 Inter-war Neo-Georgian style main building of the former high school was given local heritage listing by North Sydney Council in the North Sydney Local Environmental Plan.

== Notable alumni ==
- Bronwyn Bishop – Liberal politician who served as Speaker of the House of Representatives
- Tina Bursill – actress
- Frances Christie – linguist and curriculum expert
- Kate Grenville – author
- Jean Hay – former Mayor of Manly
- Jenni Mack – consumer activist
- Jill Perryman AM, MBE – stage actress and singer
- Jane Rutter – classical flautist

== See also ==
- List of government schools in New South Wales
