= Rank scale =

Concept in linguistics

The term rank scale was developed by Michael Halliday and is associated with systemic functional linguistics, the school of linguistic theory and description of which he is the originator. According to this theory, systems are a key organising feature of grammar, and each system originates "at a particular rank: clause, phrase, group and their associated complexes".
