= Thematic equative =

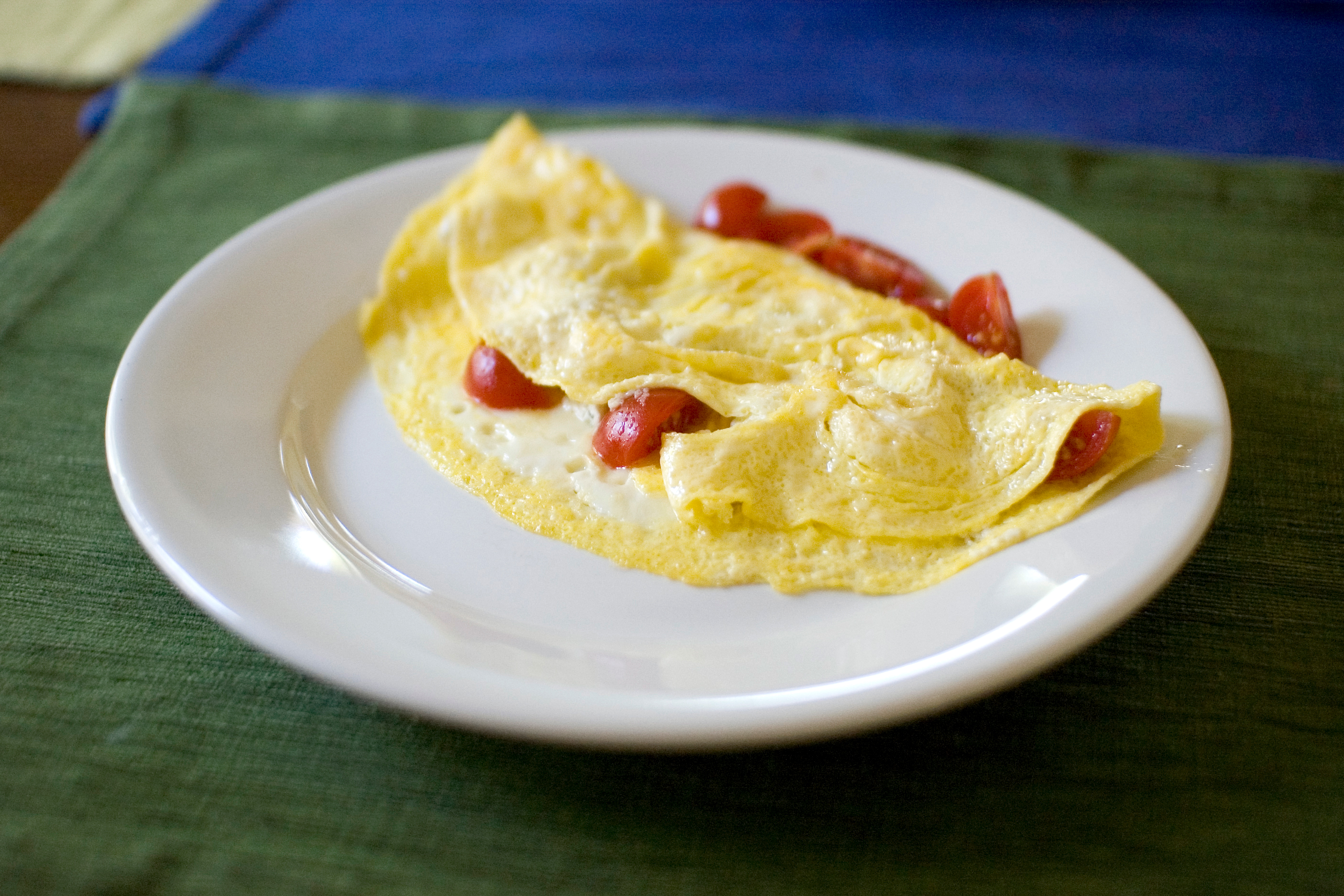
An omelette.

In systemic functional grammar, a thematic equative is a thematic resource in which two or more separate elements in a clause are grouped together to form a single constituent of the theme-plus-rheme structure. An example of this is:

What the guests need for breakfast is an omelette.

Here, the theme—the grammatical point of departure—is in bold text; it announces at the start to the listener or reader what the message will be about—the writer's or speaker's angle ("I'm going to tell you what they need for breakfast"). The rheme (the rest of the clause) is in regular text. This type of clause sets up the theme-plus-rheme structure in the form of an equation, where theme = rheme. The equation is always expressed by some form of the verb be.

A thematic equative allows for all possible parts of a clause to be shifted to the start, to be the theme, so that the message can be structured in whatever way the speaker or writer wants. For example:

An omelette is what the guests need for breakfast. [I'm going to tell you something about an omelette.]

Many common expressions are what are known as marked thematic equatives; these expressions include those that start with "That's why ..." and "That's what ..." ("That's why you can't do it," "That's what I meant").

A unique feature of the thematic equative is its conveying of a meaning of exclusiveness in the rheme. In all of these examples, the meaning is that the only thing the guests need for breakfast is an omelet. This is in contrast with "The guests need an omelette for breakfast," which leaves open the possibility that they also need other things for breakfast.

== See also ==
- Functional grammar
- Michael Halliday
- Nominal group
