= Robin Fawcett =

British linguist

- Born: 1937 (age 88–89)
- Known for: Cardiff grammar in systemic functional linguistics
- Scientific career
- Fields: Linguistics

Robin P. Fawcett (born 1937) is a British linguist known as the main exponent of the Cardiff grammar in systemic functional linguistics. He is Emeritus Professor at Cardiff University.

== Selected bibliography ==
Books

- Cognitive Linguistics and Social Interaction (1980)
- Invitation to Systemic Functional Linguistics through the Cardiff Grammar (1997)
- A theory of syntax for systemic functional linguistics (2000)

Papers

- 'The semantics of clause and verb for relational processes in English' (1987)
- 'What makes a "good" system network good?' (1988)
- 'A generationist approach to grammar reversibility in Natural Language Processing' (1994)
- 'A Systemic Functional approach to complementation in English' (1996)
- 'On the subject of the Subject in English: two positions on its meaning (and on how to test for it)' (1999)
- 'In place of Halliday's "verbal group"' (2000)
