= Basil Bernstein =

British sociologist

Basil Bernard Bernstein (1 November 1924 – 24 September 2000) was a British sociologist known for his work in the sociology of education. He worked on socio-linguistics and the connection between the manner of speaking and social organization.

== Early life and education ==
Bernstein was born on 1 November 1924, into a Jewish immigrant family, in the East End of London. After teaching and doing social work for a time, in 1960 Bernstein began graduate work. He enrolled at University College London, where he completed his PhD in linguistics.

== Career ==
He then moved to the Institute of Education at the University of London where he worked the remainder of his career. He became Karl Mannheim Chair of the Sociology of Education, Institute of Education.

On 4 June 1983, Bernstein was awarded the honorary degree "Doctor of the University" by the Open University (Milton Keynes, England).

== Theory of language code ==
Bernstein made a significant contribution to the study of communication with his sociolinguistic theory of language codes, which was developed to explain inequalities based on social class as found in language use. The theory holds that there are elaborated and restricted codes within the broader category of language codes.

The construct of restricted and elaborated language codes was introduced by Bernstein in the 1960s. As an educator, he was interested in accounting for the relatively poor performance of working-class students in language-based subjects, when they were achieving scores as high as their middle-class counterparts on mathematical topics. In his theory, Bernstein asserts a direct relationship between societal class and language.

According to Bernstein in Class, Codes and Control (1971):

Forms of spoken language in the process of their learning initiate, generalize and reinforce special types of relationship with the environment and thus create for the individual particular forms of significance (p.76).

=== Elaborated code and restricted code ===
Though Bernstein's sociolinguistic work on 'restricted code' and 'elaborated code' is widely known it represents only his very earliest work. This early work was the subject of considerable misunderstanding and controversy. Bernstein emphasised that 'code' was not dialect and that code theory was neither a bourgeois alibi for middle-class speech nor a denigrating deficit account of working-class language. The two types of language codes are the elaborated code and the restricted code. The restricted code is suitable for insiders who share assumptions and understanding on the topic, whereas the elaborated code does not assume that the listener shares these assumptions or understandings, and thus elaborated code is more explicit, more thorough, and does not require the listener to read between the lines. According to Atherton (2002),

the essence of the distinction is in what the language is suited for. The restricted code works better than the elaborated code for situations in which there is a great deal of shared and taken-for-granted knowledge in the group of speakers. It is economical and rich, conveying a vast amount of meaning with a few words, each of which has a complex set of connotations and acts like an index, pointing the hearer to a lot more information which remains unsaid.

Within the restricted code, speakers draw on background knowledge and shared understanding. This type of code creates a sense of inclusion, a feeling of belonging to a certain group. Restricted codes can be found among friends and families and other intimately knit groups.

==== Criticism ====
The concept of elaborated and restricted codes has come under criticism. The dichotomy between elaborated and restricted codes actually holds multiple distinct oppositions, such as implicit/explicit, personal/impersonal, and universal vs context-specific meanings, which are not always correlated. Code choice, rather than lack of a code among some speakers, was found to be important, as was the power imbalance between interviewers and working-class or minority children. Critics have pointed out that academic communication, even in the industrialized West, is heavily reliant on shared background information. Meanwhile, ethnographic studies showed how Western-style schools, far from being decontextualized and suited for an autonomous code, have strong linguistic and interactional expectations.

=== Code theory in sociology of education ===
Bernstein's "code theory" in the sociology of education has undergone considerable development since the early 1970s and now enjoys a growing influence in both education and linguistics, especially among systemic functional linguistics. Maton & Muller (2007) describe how Bernstein argued that different positions within society, understood in terms of their degree of specialisation, have different language use patterns that influence the ability of these groups to succeed in schools. These social positions create, as he later put it, 'different modalities of communication differentially valued by the school, and differentially effective in it, because of the school's values, modes of practice and relations with its different communities' (1996: 91). The notion was codified first in terms of "classification" and "framing", where classification conceptualises relations of power that regulate relations between contexts or categories, and framing conceptualises relations of control within these contexts or categories (1975). These concepts have been widely used to analyse educational contexts and practices and their relations to the dispositions (or coding orientation) brought to education by different social groups.

Bernstein's code theory has formed the basis for a growing range of studies into knowledge in multiple fields, both inside and outside education and across knowledge production, teaching, and learning (see, for example, Christie & Martin eds 2007; Maton 2000). Work building on his ideas has come to be known as 'social realism' (see Maton & Moore eds 2011) in contrast to 'social constructivism'. A central framework in social realism is Legitimation Code Theory, which extends and integrates key concepts from Bernstein's code theory.

== Works ==
- Class, Codes and Control: Volume 1 – Theoretical Studies Towards A Sociology Of Language (1971)
- Class, Codes and Control: Volume 2 – Applied Studies Towards A Sociology Of Language (1973)
- Selection and Control – Teachers' Ratings of Children in the Infant School (1974) with Walter Brandis
- Class, Codes and Control: Volume 3 – Towards A Theory Of Educational Transmissions (1975; 1977 second edition)
- Class, Codes and Control: Volume 4 – The Structuring Of Pedagogic Discourse (1990)
- Social Class, Language And Communication with Dorothy Henderson
- Pedagogy, Symbolic Control and Identity (1996; 2000 second edition)

== Sources ==
- Atkinson, P. (1985) Language, Structure and Reproduction: An introduction to the sociology of Basil Bernstein. London, Methuen.
- Atkinson, P., Delamont, S. & Davies, B. (1995) (eds) Discourse and Reproduction: Essays in honour of Basil Bernstein. Cresskill, NJ, Hampton Press.
- Christie, F. (1999) (ed) Pedagogy and the Shaping of Consciousness: Linguistic and social processes. London, Continuum.
- Christie, F. & Martin, J. (2007) (eds) Language, Knowledge and Pedagogy: Functional linguistic and sociological perspectives. London, Continuum.
- Maton, K. (2000) Recovering pedagogic discourse: A Bernsteinian approach to the sociology of educational knowledge, Linguistics & Education 11 (1), 79–98.
- Maton, K. (2014) Knowledge and Knowers: Towards a realist sociology of education. London, Routledge.
- Maton, K. & Moore, R. (2010) (eds) Social Realism, Knowledge and the Sociology of Education: Coalitions of the mind. London, Continuum.
- Maton, K. & Muller, J. (2007) A sociology for the transmission of knowledges, in Christie, F. & Martin, J. (eds) Language, Knowledge and Pedagogy. London, Continuum, 14–33.
- Moore, R., Arnot, M., Beck, J. & Daniels, H. (eds) (2006) Knowledge, Power and Educational Reform: Applying the sociology of Basil Bernstein. London, Routledge.
- Moore, R. & Maton, K. (2001) Founding the sociology of knowledge: Basil Bernstein, intellectual fields and the epistemic device, in Morais, A., Neves, I., Davies, B. & Daniels, H. (Eds.) Towards a Sociology of Pedagogy. New York, Peter Lang, 153–182.
- Moore, R. (2012), Basil Bernstein: The Thinker and the Field, London, Routledge.
- Morais, A., Neves, I., Davies, B. & Daniels, H. (2001) (eds) Towards a Sociology of Pedagogy: The contribution of Basil Bernstein to research. New York, Peter Lang.
- Muller, J., Davies, B. & Morais, A. (2004) (eds) Reading Bernstein, Researching Bernstein. London, RoutledgeFalmer.
- Sadovnik, A.R. (ed) (1995) Knowledge and Pedagogy: The sociology of Basil Bernstein. Norwood, NJ, Ablex
- Singh, Parlo (2020). Basil Bernstein, Code Theory, and Education: Women's Contributions. London, Routledge.

Primary sources

- The personal papers of Basil Bernstein are held in Archives of the University College London Institute of Education, University College London.
  - "Papers of Basil Bernstein (1924-2000)", UCL Archives Catalogue, University College London Institute of Education
