= Word Grammar =

Theory of linguistics

Word Grammar is a theory of linguistics, developed by Richard Hudson since the 1980s. It started as a model of syntax, whose most distinctive characteristic is its use of dependency grammar, an approach to syntax in which the sentence's structure is almost entirely contained in the information about individual words, and syntax is seen as consisting primarily of principles for combining words. The central syntactic relation is that of dependency between words; constituent structure is not recognized except in the special case of coordinate structures.

However an even more important claim of Word Grammar is that statements about words and their properties form a complex network of propositions. More recent work on Word Grammar cites neurocognitive linguistics as a source of inspiration for the idea that language is nothing but a network. One of the attractions of the network view is the possibility of analysing language in the same way as other kinds of knowledge, given that knowledge, or long-term memory, is widely considered to be a network.

Word grammar is an example of cognitive linguistics, which models language as part of general knowledge and not as a specialised mental faculty. This is in contrast to the nativism of Noam Chomsky and his students.

== Bibliography ==
- Language Networks: The New Word Grammar, Richard Hudson, 2007 ISBN 0-19-926730-8
