= Nominal group (functional grammar) =

Group of words in systemic functional grammar

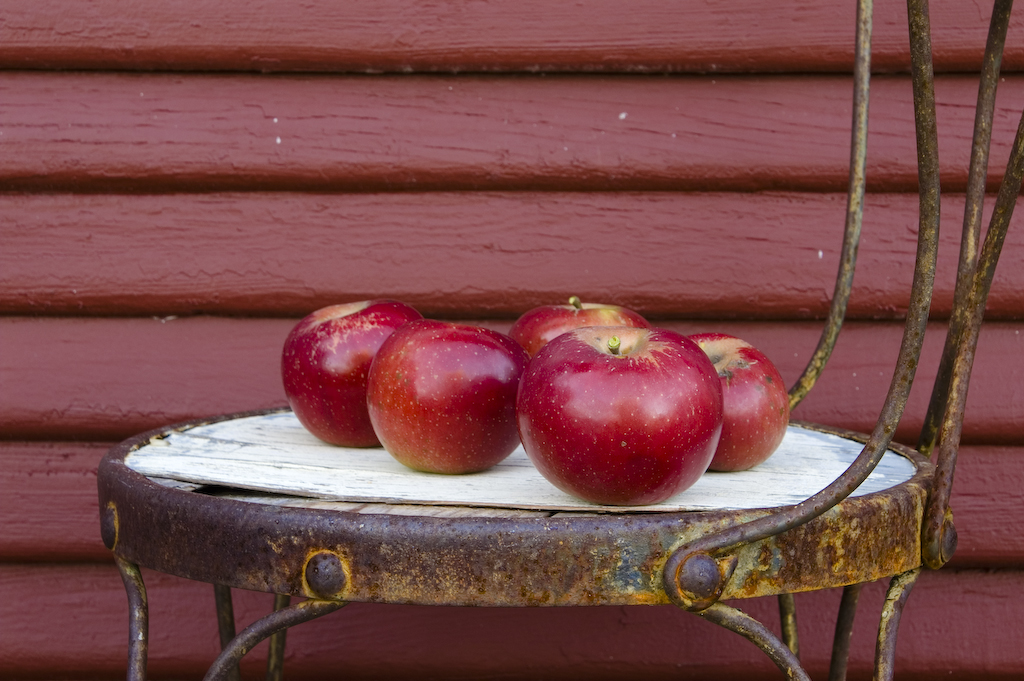
"Those five beautiful shiny Jonathan apples sitting on the chair"

In systemic functional grammar (SFG), a nominal group is a group of words that represents or describes an entity, for example The nice old English police inspector who was sitting at the table with Mr Morse. Grammatically, the wording "The nice old English police inspector who was sitting at the table with Mr Morse" can be understood as a nominal group (a description of someone), and functions as the subject of the information exchange and as the person being identified as "Mr Morse".

A nominal group is widely regarded as synonymous with noun phrase in other grammatical models. However, there are two major differences between the functional notion of a nominal group and the formal notion of a noun phrase that must be taken into account. Firstly, the coiner of the term, Halliday, and some of his followers draw a theoretical distinction between the terms group and phrase. Halliday argues that "A phrase is different from a group in that, whereas a group is an expansion of a word, a phrase is a contraction of a clause". Halliday borrowed the term group from the linguist/classicist Sydney Allen. In the second place, the functional notion of nominal group differs from the formal notion of noun phrase because the first is anchored on the thing being described whereas the second is anchored on word classes. For that reason, one can analyse the nominal groups some friends and a couple of friends very similarly in terms of function: a thing/entity quantified in an imprecise fashion; whereas one must recognise some friends as being a simple noun phrase and a couple of friends as being a noun phrase embedded in another noun phrase (one noun phrase per noun). In short, these notions are different even if formalists do not perceive them as different.

== The rank scale in SFG ==
SFG postulates a rank scale, in which the highest unit is the clause and the lowest is the morpheme: coming from the largest unit down, we can divide the parts of a clause into groups and phrases; and coming from the smallest units up, we can group morphemes into words. Typically, groups are made out of words while phrases are made out of groups: e.g. clause constituents (the apples) (are) (on the chair), phrase constituents (on) (the chair), group constituents (the) (apples), word constituents (apple)(s). In that sense, each unit of a rank typically consists of one or more units of the rank below, not of the same rank (see rank-shifting section for exceptions to this typical pattern). At group/phrase rank besides nominal group, there are also the "verbal group", the "adverbial group", the "prepositional group" (e.g. from under), and the "prepositional phrase" (e.g. from under the sofa).

The term 'nominal' in 'nominal group' was adopted because it denotes a wider class of phenomena than the term noun. The nominal group is a structure which includes nouns, adjectives, numerals and determiners, which is associated with the thing under description (a.k.a. entity), and whose supporting logic is Description logic.

The term noun has a narrower purview and is detached from any notion of entity description. For instance, the words bit/bits in a bit of time, a little bit of peanut butter, and bits of information can be understood as a noun, but they can hardly be understood as representing some entity on its own. In that sense, these words shall be understood as being the head of a "noun phrase" in a formalist account of grammar, but as a portion of some substance in a nominal group. Since formal linguists are interested in the recurring patterns of word classes such as "a" + "[noun]" and not in the way humans describe entities, they recruit the term "noun phrase" for their grammatical descriptions, a structure defined as a pattern around a noun, and not as a way of describing an entity such as the "nominal group". In other words, given the different architectures of language that are assumed by functional and formal theories of language, the terms "noun phrase" and "nominal group" must be seen to be doing quite different descriptive work.

For instance, these group/phrase elements are re-interpreted as functional categories, in the first instance as process, participant and circumstance, with the nominal group as the pre-eminent structure for the expression of participant roles in discourse.

Within Halliday's functionalist classification of this structure, he identifies the functions of Deictic, Numerative, Epithet, Classifer and Thing. The word classes which typically realise these functions are set out in the table below:

| Deictic | Deictic2 | Numerative | Epithet | Classifier | Thing |
| determiner | adjective | numeral | adjective | noun or adjective | noun |

Within a clause, a definite nominal group functions as if it were a proper noun. The proper noun (or the common noun when there is no proper noun) functions as the head of the nominal group; all other constituents work as modifiers of the head. The modifiers preceding the head are called premodifiers and the ones after it postmodifiers. The modifiers that represent a circumstance such as a location are called qualifiers. In English, most postmodifiers are qualifiers. In the following example of a nominal group, the head is bolded.

Those five beautiful shiny Jonathan apples sitting on the chair

English is a highly nominalised language, and thus lexical meaning is largely carried in nominal groups. This is partly because of the flexibility of these groups in encompassing premodifiers and qualification, and partly because of the availability of a special resource called the thematic equative, which has evolved as a means of packaging the message of a clause in the desired thematic form (for example, the clause [What attracts her to the course] is [the depth of understanding it provides] is structured as [nominal group A] = [nominal group B]). Many things are most readily expressed in nominal constructions; this is particularly so in registers that have to do with the world of science and technology, where things, and the ideas behind them, are multiplying and proliferating all the time.

== Three metafunctions in the nominal group ==
Like the English clause, the nominal group is a combination of three distinct functional components, or metafunctions, which express three largely independent sets of semantic choice: the ideational (what the clause or nominal group is about); the interpersonal (what the clause is doing as a verbal exchange between speaker and listener, or writer and reader); and the textual (how the message is organised—how it relates to the surrounding text and the context in which it is occurring/ it occurs). In a clause, each metafunction is a virtually complete structure, and the three structures combine into one in interpretation. However, beneath the clause—in phrases and in groups, such as the nominal group—the three structures are incomplete of themselves and need to be interpreted separately, "as partial contributions to a single structural line". In nominal groups, the ideational structure is by far the most significant in premodifying the head. To interpret premodification, it is necessary to split the ideational metafunction into two dimensions: the experiential and the logical.

== Experiential dimension ==
The experiential dimension concerns how meaning is expressed in the group as the organisation of experience. The critical question is how and whether the head is modified. The head does not have to be modified to constitute a group in this technical sense. Thus, four types of nominal group are possible: the head alone ("apples"), the head with premodifiers ("Those five beautiful shiny Jonathan apples"), the head with a qualifier ("apples sitting on the chair"), and the full structure of premodification and qualification, as above.

=== Functions of the premodifiers ===
In this example, the premodifiers characterise the head, on what is known as the uppermost rank (see "Rankshifting" below). In some formal grammars, all of the premodifying items in the example above, except for "Those", would be referred to as adjectives, despite the fact that each item has a quite different grammatical function in the group. An epithet indicates some quality of the head: "shiny" is an experiential epithet, since it describes an objective quality that we can all experience; by contrast, "beautiful" is an interpersonal epithet, since it is an expression of the speaker's subjective attitude towards the apples, and thus partly a matter of the relationship between speaker and listener. "Jonathan" is a classifier, which indicates a particular subclass of the head (not Arkansas Black or Granny Smith apples, but Jonathan apples); a classifier cannot usually be intensified ("very Jonathan apples" is ungrammatical). "Five" is a numerator, and unlike the other three items, describes not a quality of the head but its quantity.

=== Ordering of the premodifiers: from speaker–now to increasingly permanent attributes ===
The experiential pattern in nominal groups opens with the identification of the head in terms of the immediate context of the speech event—the here-and-now—what Halliday calls "the speaker–now matrix". Take, for example, the first word of the nominal group exemplified above: "those": "those apples", as opposed to "these apples", means "you know the apples I mean—the ones over there, not close to me"; distance or proximity to the immediate speech event could also be in temporal terms (the ones we picked last week, not today), or in terms of the surrounding text (the apples mentioned in the previous paragraph in another context, not in the previous sentence in the same context as now) and the assumed background knowledge of the listener/speaker ("the apple" as opposed to "an apple" means "the one you know about"). The same function is true of other deictics, such as "my", "all", "each", "no", "some", and "either": they establish the relevance of the head—they "fix" it, as it were—in terms of the speech event.

There is a progression from this opening of the nominal group, with the greatest specifying potential, through items that have successively less identifying potential and are increasingly permanent as attributes of the head. As Halliday points out, "the more permanent the attribute of a thing, the less likely it is to identify it in a particular context" (that is, of the speech event). The most permanent item, of course, is the head itself. This pattern from transient specification to permanent attribute explains why the items are ordered as they are in a nominal group. The deictic ("those") comes first; this is followed by the numerative, if there is one ("five"), since the number of apples, in this case, is the least permanent attribute; next comes the interpersonal epithet which, arising from the speaker's opinion, is closer to the speaker–now matrix than the more objectively testable experiential epithet ("shiny"); then comes the more permanent classifier ("Jonathan", a type of apple), leading to the head itself. This ordering of increasing permanence from left to right is why we are more likely to say "her new black car" than "her black new car": the newness will recede sooner than the blackness.

== Logical dimension ==
The logic of the group in English is recursive, based on successive subsets: working leftwards from the head, the first question that can be asked is "what kind of apples?" (Jonathan apples.) Then, "what kind of Jonathan apples?" (Shiny Jonathan apples.) "What kind of shiny Jonathan apples?" (Beautiful shiny Jonathan apples) "What kind of beautiful shiny Jonathan apples?" Here the recursive logic changes, since this is a multivariate, not a univariate, nominal group—the question now is "How many beautiful shiny Jonathan apples?" and after that, "How do those five beautiful shiny Jonathan apples relate to me the speaker/writer, now?" ("Those ones".) In contrast, the logical questions of a univariate group would be unchanged right through, typical of long strings of nouns in news headlines and signage ("International departure lounge ladies' first-class washroom").

== Rank-shifting ==
The post-modifiers here contain information that is rankshifted. Returning to the original example above, "on the chair" is a prepositional phrase embedded within the nominal group; this prepositional phrase itself contains a nominal group ("the chair"), comprising the head ("chair"), and a deictic ("the") which indicates whether some specific subset of the head is intended (here, a specific chair we can identify from the context). By contrast, "Those" is a deictic on the uppermost rank and is applied to the head on the uppermost rank, "apples"; here, "those" means "You know which apples I mean—the ones over there".

== See also ==
- Noun phrase
- Systemic functional linguistics
