= Functional linguistics =

Approach to linguistics

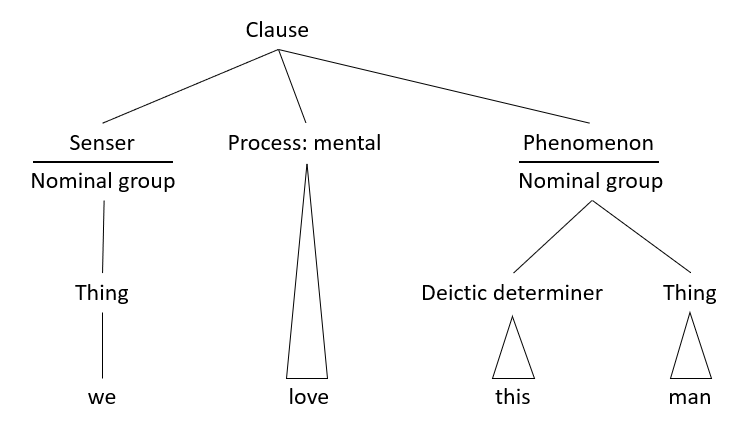
A Systemic functional grammar (SFG) analysis of the clause 'we love this man'. This clause consists structurally of a verb and two nominal groups, and functionally of a 'senser', 'mental process' and 'phenomenon'. In SFG, these functions are the result of semantic choices made in the Transitivity system.

Functional linguistics is an approach to the study of language characterized by taking systematically into account the speaker's and the hearer's side, and the communicative needs of the speaker and of the given language community. Linguistic functionalism spawned in the 1920s to 1930s from Ferdinand de Saussure's systematic structuralist approach to language (1916).

Functionalism sees functionality of language and its elements to be the key to understanding linguistic processes and structures. Functional theories of language propose that since language is fundamentally a tool, it is reasonable to assume that its structures are best analyzed and understood with reference to the functions they carry out. These include the tasks of conveying meaning and contextual information.

Functional theories of grammar belong to structural and, broadly, humanistic linguistics, considering language as being created by the community, and linguistics as relating to systems theory. Functional theories take into account the context where linguistic elements are used and study the way they are instrumentally useful or functional in the given environment. This means that pragmatics is given an explanatory role, along with semantics. The formal relations between linguistic elements are assumed to be functionally-motivated. Functionalism is sometimes contrasted with formalism, but this does not exclude functional theories from creating grammatical descriptions that are generative in the sense of formulating rules that distinguish grammatical or well-formed elements from ungrammatical elements.

Simon Dik characterizes the functional approach as follows:

In the functional paradigm a language is in the first place conceptualized as an instrument of social interaction among human beings, used with the intention of establishing communicative relationships. Within this paradigm one attempts to reveal the instrumentality of language with respect to what people do and achieve with it in social interaction. A natural language, in other words, is seen as an integrated part of the communicative competence of the natural language user. (2, p. 3)

Functional theories of grammar can be divided on the basis of geographical origin or base (though it simplifies many aspects): European functionalist theories include Functional (discourse) grammar and Systemic functional grammar (among others), while American functionalist theories include Role and reference grammar and West Coast functionalism. Since the 1970s, studies by American functional linguists in languages other than English from Asia, Africa, Australia and the Americas (like Mandarin Chinese and Japanese), led to insights about the interaction of form and function, and the discovery of functional motivations for grammatical phenomena, which apply also to the English language.

== History ==
=== 1920s to 1970s: early developments ===
The establishment of functional linguistics follows from a shift from structural to functional explanation in 1920s sociology. Prague, at the crossroads of western European structuralism and Russian formalism, became an important centre for functional linguistics.

The shift was related to the organic analogy exploited by Émile Durkheim and Ferdinand de Saussure. Saussure had argued in his Course in General Linguistics that the 'organism' of language should be studied anatomically, and not in respect with its environment, to avoid the false conclusions made by August Schleicher and other social Darwinists. The post-Saussurean functionalist movement sought ways to account for the 'adaptation' of language to its environment while still remaining strictly anti-Darwinian.

Russian émigrés Roman Jakobson and Nikolai Trubetzkoy disseminated insights of Russian grammarians in Prague, but also the evolutionary theory of Lev Berg, arguing for teleology of language change. As Berg's theory failed to gain popularity outside the Soviet Union, the organic aspect of functionalism diminished, and Jakobson adopted a standard model of functional explanation from Ernst Nagel's philosophy of science. It is, then, the same mode of explanation as in biology and social sciences; but it became emphasised that the word 'adaptation' is not to be understood in linguistics in the same meaning as in biology.

Work on functionalist linguistics by the Prague school resumed in the 1950s after a hiatus caused by World War II and Stalinism. In North America, Joseph Greenberg published his 1963 seminal paper on language universals that not only revived the field of linguistic typology, but also the approach of seeking functional explanations for typological patterns. Greenberg's approach has been highly influential for the movement of North American functionalism that formed from the early 1970s, which has since been characterized by a profound interest in typology. Greenberg's paper was influenced by the Prague School and in particular it was written in response to Jakobson's call for an 'implicational typology'. While North American functionalism was initially influenced by the functionalism of the Prague school, such influence has been later discontinued.

=== 1980s onward: name controversy ===
The term 'functionalism' or 'functional linguistics' became controversial in the 1980s with the rise of a new wave of evolutionary linguistics. Johanna Nichols argued that the meaning of 'functionalism' had changed, and the terms formalism and functionalism should be taken as referring to generative grammar, and the emergent linguistics of Paul Hopper and Sandra Thompson, respectively; and that the term structuralism should be reserved for frameworks derived from the Prague linguistic circle. William Croft argued subsequently that it is a fact to be agreed by all linguists that form does not follow from function. He proposed that functionalism should be understood as autonomous linguistics, opposing the idea that language arises functionally from the need to express meaning:

"The notion of autonomy emerges from an undeniable fact of all languages, 'the curious lack of accord ... between form and function'"

Croft explains that, until the 1970s, functionalism related to semantics and pragmatics, or the 'semiotic function'. But around 1980s the notion of function changed from semiotics to "external function", proposing a neo-Darwinian view of language change as based on natural selection. Croft proposes that 'structuralism' and 'formalism' should both be taken as referring to generative grammar; and 'functionalism' to usage-based and cognitive linguistics; while neither André Martinet, Systemic functional linguistics nor Functional discourse grammar properly represents any of the three concepts.

The situation was further complicated by the arrival of evolutionary psychological thinking in linguistics, with Steven Pinker, Ray Jackendoff and others hypothesising that the human language faculty, or universal grammar, could have developed through normal evolutionary processes, thus defending an adaptational explanation of the origin and evolution of the language faculty. This brought about a functionalism versus formalism debate, with Frederick Newmeyer arguing that the evolutionary psychological approach to linguistics should also be considered functionalist.

The terms functionalism and functional linguistics nonetheless continue to be used by the Prague linguistic circle and its derivatives, including SILF, Danish functional school, Systemic functional linguistics and Functional discourse grammar; and the American framework Role and reference grammar which sees itself as the midway between formal and functional linguistics.

== Functional analysis ==
Since the earliest work of the Prague School, language was conceived as a functional system, where term system references back to De Saussure structuralist approach. The term function seems to have been introduced by Vilém Mathesius, possibly influenced from works in sociology. Functional analysis is the examination of how linguistic elements function on different layers of linguistic structure, and how the levels interact with each other. Functions exist on all levels of grammar, even in phonology, where the phoneme has the function of distinguishing between lexical material.

- Syntactic functions: (e.g. Subject and Object), defining different perspectives in the presentation of a linguistic expression.
- Semantic functions: (Agent, Patient, Recipient, etc.), describing the role of participants in states of affairs or actions expressed.
- Pragmatic functions: (Theme and Rheme, Topic and Focus, Predicate), defining the informational status of constituents, determined by the pragmatic context of the verbal interaction.

== Functional explanation ==
In the functional mode of explanation, a linguistic structure is explained with an appeal to its function. Functional linguistics takes as its starting point the notion that communication is the primary purpose of language. Therefore, general phonological, morphosyntactic and semantic phenomena are thought of as being motivated by the needs of people to communicate successfully with each other. Thus, the perspective is taken that the organisation of language reflects its use value.

Many prominent functionalist approaches, like Role and reference grammar and Functional discourse grammar, are also typologically oriented, that is they aim their analysis cross-linguistically, rather than only to a single language like English (as is typical of formalist/generativism approaches).

=== Economy ===
The concept of economy is metaphorically transferred from a social or economical context to a linguistic level. It is considered as a regulating force in language maintenance. Controlling the impact of language change or internal and external conflicts of the system, the economy principle means that systemic coherence is maintained without increasing energy cost. This is why all human languages, no matter how different they are, have high functional value as based on a compromise between the competing motivations of speaker-easiness (simplicity or inertia) versus hearer-easiness (clarity or energeia).

The principle of economy was elaborated by the French structural–functional linguist André Martinet. Martinet's concept is similar to Zipf's principle of least effort; although the idea had been discussed by various linguists in the late 19th and early 20th century. The functionalist concept of economy is not to be confused with economy in generative grammar.

=== Information structure ===
Some key adaptations of functional explanation are found in the study of information structure. Based on earlier linguists' work, Prague Circle linguists Vilém Mathesius, Jan Firbas and others elaborated the concept of theme–rheme relations (topic and comment) to study pragmatic concepts such as sentence focus, and givenness of information, to successfully explain word-order variation. The method has been used widely in linguistics to uncover word-order patterns in the languages of the world. Its importance, however, is limited to within-language variation, with no apparent explanation of cross-linguistic word order tendencies.

=== Functional principles ===
Several principles from pragmatics have been proposed as functional explanations of linguistic structures, often in a typological perspective.

- Theme first: languages prefer placing the theme before the rheme; and the subject typically carries the role of the theme; therefore, most languages have subject before object in their basic word order.
- Animate first: similarly, since subjects are more likely to be animate, they are more likely to precede the object.
- Given before new: already established information comes before new information.
- First things first: more important or more urgent information comes before other information.
- Lightness: light (short) constituents are ordered before heavy (long) constituents.
- Uniformity: word-order choices are generalised. For example, languages tend to have either prepositions or postpositions; and not both equally.
- Functional load: elements within a linguistic sub-system are made distinct to avoid confusion.
- Orientation: role-indicating particles including adpositions and subordinators are oriented to their semantic head.

== Frameworks ==
There are several distinct grammatical frameworks that employ a functional approach.

- The structuralist functionalism of the Prague school was the earliest functionalist framework developed in the 1920s.
- André Martinet's Functional Syntax, with two major books, A functional view of language (1962) and Studies in Functional Syntax (1975). Martinet is one of the most famous French linguists and can be regarded as the father of French functionalism. Founded by Martinet and his colleagues, SILF (Société internationale de linguistique fonctionnelle) is an international organisation of functional linguistics which operates mainly in French.
- Simon Dik's Functional Grammar, originally developed in the 1970s and 80s, has been influential and inspired many other functional theories. It has been developed into Functional Discourse Grammar by the linguist Kees Hengeveld.
- Michael Halliday's systemic functional grammar (SFG) argues that the explanation of how language works "needed to be grounded in a functional analysis, since language had evolved in the process of carrying out certain critical functions as human beings interacted with their ... 'eco-social' environment". Halliday draws on the work of Bühler and Malinowski, as well as his doctoral supervisor J.R. Firth. Notably, Halliday's former student Robin Fawcett has developed a version of SFG called the "Cardiff Grammar" which is distinct from the "Sydney Grammar" as developed by the later Halliday and his colleagues in Australia. The link between Firthian and Hallidayan linguistics and the philosophy of Alfred North Whitehead also deserves a mention.
- Role and reference grammar, developed by Robert Van Valin employs functional analytical framework with a somewhat formal mode of description. In RRG, the description of a sentence in a particular language is formulated in terms of its semantic structure and communicative functions, as well as the grammatical procedures used to express these meanings.
- Danish functional grammar combines Saussurean/Hjelmslevian structuralism with a focus on pragmatics and discourse.
- Interactional linguistics, based on Conversation Analysis, considers linguistic structures as related to the functions of e.g. action and turn-taking in interaction.
- Construction grammar is a family of different theories some of which may be considered functional, such as Croft's Radical Construction Grammar.
- Relational Network Theory (RNT) or Neurocognitive Linguistics (NCL), originally developed by Sydney Lamb, may be considered functionalist in the sense of being a usage-based model. In RNT, the description of linguistic structure is formulated as networks of realizational relationships, such that all linguistic units are defined only by what they realize and are realized by. RNT networks have been hypothesized to be implemented by cortical minicolumns in the human neocortex.

== See also ==
- Theory of language
- Functional grammar (disambiguation)
- Thematic relation
- Morphosyntactic alignment
- Linguistic typology
