= Role and reference grammar =

Grammar model

Role and reference grammar (RRG) is a model of grammar developed by William A. Foley and Robert Van Valin, Jr. in the 1980s, which incorporates many of the points of view of current functional grammar theories.

In RRG, the description of a sentence in a particular language is formulated in terms of (a) its logical (semantic) structure and communicative functions, and (b) the grammatical procedures that are available in the language for the expression of these meanings.

Among the main features of RRG are the use of lexical decomposition, based upon the predicate semantics of David Dowty (1979), an analysis of clause structure, and the use of a set of thematic roles organized into a hierarchy in which the highest-ranking roles are 'Actor' (for the most active participant) and 'Undergoer'.

RRG's practical approach to language is demonstrated in the multilingual Natural Language Understanding (NLU) system of cognitive scientist John Ball. In 2012, Ball integrated his Patom Theory with Role and Reference Grammar, producing a language independent NLU breaking down language by meaning.

== See also ==
- Relational grammar
- Syntax‐semantics interface

== Bibliography ==
- Foley, William A.; & Robert D. Van Valin, Jr (1984). Functional syntax and universal grammar. Cambridge: Cambridge University Press.
- Van Valin, Robert D., Jr. (Ed.). (1993). Advances in Role and Reference Grammar. Amsterdam: Benjamins.
- Van Valin, Robert D., Jr. (1993). A synopsis of Role and Reference Grammar. In R. D. Van Valin Jr. (Ed.), Advances in Role and Reference Grammar (pp. 1–164). Amsterdam: Benjamins.
- Van Valin, Robert D., Jr.; & William A. Foley (1980). Role and Reference Grammar. In: E. A. Moravcsik & J. R. Wirth (Eds.), Current approaches to syntax (pp. 329–352). Syntax and semantics (Vol. 13). New York: Academic Press.
- Van Valin, Robert D., Jr.; & Randy LaPolla (1997). Syntax: Structure, meaning and function. Cambridge: Cambridge University Press.
- Van Valin, Robert D., Jr. (2003). Exploring the Syntax-Semantics Interface. Cambridge: Cambridge University Press.
