= Systemic functional grammar =

Primary tenets

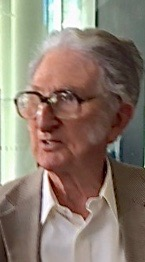
Michael Halliday at his 90th-birthday symposium, 17 February 2015

Systemic functional grammar (SFG) is a form of grammatical description originated by Michael Halliday. It is part of a social semiotic approach to language called systemic functional linguistics. In these two terms, systemic refers to the view of language as "a network of systems, or interrelated sets of options for making meaning"; functional refers to Halliday's view that language is as it is because of what it has evolved to do (see Metafunction). Thus, what he refers to as the multidimensional architecture of language "reflects the multidimensional nature of human experience and interpersonal relations".

== Influences ==
Halliday describes his grammar as built on the work of Saussure, Louis Hjelmslev, Malinowski, J.R. Firth, and the Prague school linguists. In addition, he drew on the work of the American anthropological linguists Boas, Sapir and Whorf. His "main inspiration" was Firth, to whom he owes, among other things, the notion of language as a system. Among American linguists, Whorf had "the most profound effect on my own thinking". Whorf "showed how it is that human beings do not all mean alike, and how their unconscious ways of meaning are among the most significant manifestations of their culture". From his studies in China, he lists Luo Changpei and Wang Li as two scholars from whom he gained "new and exciting insights into language". He credits Luo for giving him a diachronic perspective and insights into a non-Indo-European language family. From Wang Li he learnt "many things, including research methods in dialectology, the semantic basis of grammar, and the history of linguistics in China".

== Basic tenets ==
Some interrelated key terms underpin Halliday's approach to grammar, which forms part of his account of how language works. These concepts are: system, (meta)function, and rank. Another key term is lexicogrammar. In this view, grammar and lexis are two ends of the same continuum.

Analysis of the grammar is taken from a trinocular perspective, meaning from three different levels. So to look at lexicogrammar, it can be analysed from two more levels, 'above' (semantic) and 'below' (phonology). This grammar gives emphasis to the view from above.

For Halliday, grammar is described as systems not as rules, on the basis that every grammatical structure involves a choice from a describable set of options. Language is thus a meaning potential. Grammarians in SF tradition use system networks to map the available options in a language. In relation to English, for instance, Halliday has described systems such as mood, agency, theme, etc. Halliday describes grammatical systems as closed, i.e. as having a finite set of options. By contrast, lexical sets are open systems, since new words come into a language all the time.

These grammatical systems play a role in the construal of meanings of different kinds. This is the basis of Halliday's claim that language is meta-functionally organised. He argues that the raison d'être of language is meaning in social life, and for this reason all languages have three kinds of semantic components. All languages have resources for construing experience (the ideational component), resources for enacting humans' diverse and complex social relations (the interpersonal component), and resources for enabling these two kinds of meanings to come together in coherent text (the textual function). Each of the grammatical systems proposed by Halliday are related to these metafunctions. For instance, the grammatical system of 'mood' is considered to be centrally related to the expression of interpersonal meanings, 'process type' to the expression of experiential meanings, and 'theme' to the expression of textual meanings.

Traditionally the "choices" are viewed in terms of either the content or the structure of the language used. In SFG, language is analysed in three ways (strata): semantics, phonology, and lexicogrammar. SFG presents a view of language in terms of both structure (grammar) and words (lexis). The term "lexicogrammar" describes this combined approach.

== Metafunctions ==
From early on in his account of language, Halliday has argued that it is inherently functional. His early papers on the grammar of English make reference to the "functional components" of language, as "generalized uses of language, which, since they seem to determine the nature of the language system, require to be incorporated into our account of that system." Halliday argues that this functional organization of language "determines the form taken by grammatical structure".

Halliday refers to his functions of language as metafunctions. He proposes three general functions: the ideational, the interpersonal and the textual.

=== Ideational metafunction ===
The ideational metafunction is the function for construing human experience. It is the means by which we make sense of "reality". Halliday divides the ideational into the logical and the experiential metafunctions. The logical metafunction refers to the grammatical resources for building up grammatical units into complexes, for instance, for combining two or more clauses into a clause complex. The experiential function refers to the grammatical resources involved in construing the flux of experience through the unit of the clause.

The ideational metafunction reflects the contextual value of field, that is, the nature of the social process in which the language is implicated. An analysis of a text from the perspective of the ideational function involves inquiring into the choices in the grammatical system of "transitivity": that is, process types, participant types, circumstance types, combined with an analysis of the resources through which clauses are combined. Halliday's An Introduction to Functional Grammar (in the third edition, with revisions by Christian Matthiessen) sets out the description of these grammatical systems.

=== Interpersonal metafunction ===
The interpersonal metafunction relates to a text's aspects of tenor or interactivity. Like field, tenor comprises three component areas: the speaker/writer persona, social distance, and relative social status. Social distance and relative social status are applicable only to spoken texts, although a case has been made that these two factors can also apply to written text.

The speaker/writer persona concerns the stance, personalisation and standing of the speaker or writer. This involves looking at whether the writer or speaker has a neutral attitude, which can be seen through the use of positive or negative language. Social distance means how close the speakers are, e.g. how the use of nicknames shows the degree to which they are intimate. Relative social status asks whether they are equal in terms of power and knowledge on a subject, for example, the relationship between a mother and child would be considered unequal. Focuses here are on speech acts (e.g. whether one person tends to ask questions and the other speaker tends to answer), who chooses the topic, turn management, and how capable both speakers are of evaluating the subject.

=== Textual metafunction ===
The textual metafunction relates to mode; the internal organisation and communicative nature of a text. This comprises textual interactivity, spontaneity and communicative distance.

Textual interactivity is examined with reference to disfluencies such as hesitators, pauses and repetitions.

Spontaneity is determined through a focus on lexical density, grammatical complexity, coordination (how clauses are linked together) and the use of nominal groups. The study of communicative distance involves looking at a text's cohesion—that is, how it hangs together, as well as any abstract language it uses.

Cohesion is analysed in the context of both lexical and grammatical as well as intonational aspects with reference to lexical chains and, in the speech register, tonality, tonicity, and tone. The lexical aspect focuses on sense relations and lexical repetitions, while the grammatical aspect looks at repetition of meaning shown through reference, substitution and ellipsis, as well as the role of linking adverbials.

Systemic functional grammar deals with all of these areas of meaning equally within the grammatical system itself.

== Children’s grammar ==
Michael Halliday (1973) outlined seven functions of language with regard to the grammar used by children:

- the instrumental function serves to manipulate the environment, to cause certain events to happen;
- the regulatory function of language is the control of events;
- the representational function is the use of language to make statements, convey facts and knowledge, explain, or report to represent reality as the speaker/writer sees it;
- the interactional function of language serves to ensure social maintenance;
- the personal function is to express emotions, personality, and "gut-level" reactions;
- the heuristic function used to acquire knowledge, to learn about the environment;
- the imaginative function serves to create imaginary systems or ideas.

== Relation to other branches of grammar ==
Halliday's theory sets out to explain how spoken and written texts construe meanings and how the resources of language are organised in open systems and functionally bound to meanings. It is a theory of language in use, creating systematic relations between choices and forms within the less abstract strata of grammar and phonology, on the one hand, and more abstract strata such as context of situation and context of culture on the other. It is a radically different theory of language from others which explore less abstract strata as autonomous systems, the most notable being Noam Chomsky's. Since the principal aim of systemic functional grammar is to represent the grammatical system as a resource for making meaning, it addresses different concerns. For example, it does not try to address Chomsky's thesis that there is a "finite rule system which generates all and only the grammatical sentences in a language". Halliday's theory encourages a more open approach to the definition of language as a resource; rather than focus on grammaticality as such, a systemic functional grammatical treatment focuses instead on the relative frequencies of choices made in uses of language and assumes that these relative frequencies reflect the probability that particular paths through the available resources will be chosen rather than others. Thus, SFG does not describe language as a finite rule system, but rather as a system, realised by instantiations, that is continuously expanded by the very instantiations that realise it and that is continuously reproduced and recreated with use.

Another way to understand the difference in concerns between systemic functional grammar and most variants of generative grammar is through Chomsky's claim that "linguistics is a sub-branch of psychology". Halliday investigates linguistics more as a sub-branch of sociology. SFG therefore pays much more attention to pragmatics and discourse semantics than is traditionally the case in formalism.

The orientation of systemic functional grammar has served to encourage several further grammatical accounts that deal with some perceived weaknesses of the theory and similarly orient to issues not seen to be addressed in more structural accounts. Examples include the model of Richard Hudson called word grammar, and William B. McGregor's Semiotic Grammar which revises the organization of the metafunctions.

== See also ==
- Thematic equative

Other significant systemic functional grammarians:

- Ruqaiya Hasan
- J.R. Martin
- C.M.I.M. Matthiessen

Linguists also involved with the early development of the approach:

- Randolph Quirk
- Richard Hudson
