= Metafunction =

Concept in functional linguistics

The term metafunction originates in systemic functional linguistics and is considered to be a property of all languages. Systemic functional linguistics is functional and semantic rather than formal and syntactic in its orientation. As a functional linguistic theory, it claims that both the emergence of grammar and the particular forms that grammars take should be explained "in terms of the functions that language evolved to serve". While languages vary in how and what they do, and what humans do with them in the contexts of human cultural practice, all languages are considered to be shaped and organised in relation to three functions, or metafunctions. Michael Halliday, the founder of systemic functional linguistics, calls these three functions the ideational, interpersonal, and textual. The ideational function is further divided into the experiential and logical.

Metafunctions are systemic clusters; that is, they are groups of semantic systems that make meanings of a related kind. The three metafunctions are mapped onto the structure of the clause. For this reason, systemic linguists analyse a clause from three perspectives. Halliday argues that the concept of metafunction is one of a small set of principles that are necessary to explain how language works; this concept of function in language is necessary to explain the organisation of the semantic system of language. Function is considered to be "a fundamental property of language itself".

According to Ruqaiya Hasan, the metafunctions in SFL "are not hierarchised; they have equal status, and each is manifested in every act of language use: in fact, an important task for grammatics is to describe how the three metafunctions are woven together into the same linguistic unit". Hasan argues that this is one way in which Halliday's account of the functions of language is different from that of Karl Bühler, for example, for whom functions of language are hierarchically ordered, with the referential function the most important of all. For Buhler, the functions were considered to operate one at a time. In SFL, the metafunctions operate simultaneously, and any utterance is a harmony of choices across all three functions.

== Ideational function ==
The ideational function is language concerned with building and maintaining a theory of experience. It includes the experiential function and the logical function.

=== Experiential function ===
The experiential function refers to the grammatical choices that enable speakers to make meanings about the world around them and inside them:

"Most obviously, perhaps, when we watch small children interacting with the objects around them we can see that they are using language to construe a theoretical model of their experience. This is language in the experiential function; the patterns of meaning are installed in the brain and continue to expand on a vast scale as each child, in cahoots with all those around, builds up, renovates and keeps in good repair the semiotic "reality" that provides the framework of day-to-day existency and is manifested in every moment of discourse, spoken or listened to. We should stress, I think, that the grammar is not merely annotating experience; it is construing experience."

Halliday argues that it was through this process of humans making meaning from experience that language evolved. Thus, the human species had to "make sense of the complex world in which it evolved: to classify, or group into categories, the objects and events within its awareness". These categories are not given to us through our senses; they have to be "construed". In taking this position on the active role of grammar in construing "reality", Halliday was influenced by Whorf.

=== Logical function ===
Halliday describes the logical function as those systems "which set up logical–semantic relationships between one clausal unit and another" The systems which come under the logical function are taxis and logico-semantic relations. When two clauses are combined, a speaker chooses whether to give both clauses equal status or to make one dependent on the other. In addition, a speaker chooses some meaning relation in the process of joining or binding clauses together. Halliday argues that the meanings we make in such processes are most closely related to the experiential function. For this reason, he puts the experiential and logical functions together into the ideational function.

== Interpersonal function ==
The interpersonal function refers to the grammatical choices that enable speakers to enact their complex and diverse interpersonal relations. This tenet of systemic functional linguistics is based on the claim that a speaker not only talks about something, but is always talking to and with others. Language not only construes experience, but simultaneously acts out "the interpersonal encounters that are essential to our survival". Halliday argues that these encounters:

"range all the way from the rapidly changing microencounters of daily life – most centrally, semiotic encounters where we set up and maintain complex patterns of dialogue – to the more permanent institutionalized relationships that collectively constitute the social bond."

The grammatical systems that relate to the interpersonal function include Mood, Modality, and Polarity.

== Textual function ==
Halliday argues that both experiential and interpersonal functions are intricately organized, but that between the two "there is comparatively very little constraint". This means that "by and large, you can put any interactional 'spin' on any representational content". What allows meanings from these two modes to freely combine is the intercession of a third, distinct mode of meaning that Halliday refers to as the textual function. The term encompasses all of the grammatical systems responsible for managing the flow of discourse. These systems "create coherent text – text that coheres within itself and with the context of situation" They are both structural (involving choices relating to the ordering of elements in the clause), and non-structural (involving choices that create cohesive ties between units that have no structural bond). The relevant grammatical systems include Theme, Given and New, as well as the systems of cohesion, such as Reference, Substitution, and Ellipsis. Halliday argues that the textual function is distinct from both the experiential and interpersonal because its object is language itself. Through the textual function, language "creates a semiotic world of its own: a parallel universe, or 'virtual reality' in modern terms".
