= Jay Lemke =

Jay Lemke (born 1946) is an American semiotician and science education scholar with a background in physics. He is professor of education at the University of Michigan.

== Biography ==
Lemke obtained his B.S. (Physics) from the University of Chicago in 1966, his M.S. (Physics) from the University of Chicago in 1968, and his Ph.D. (Theoretical Physics) from the *University of Chicago 1973.

After getting his Ph.D. in Theoretical Physics at the University of Chicago in 1973, Lemke taught at Brooklyn College as a faculty member in the School of Education. Between 2000 and 2002, he was the Executive Officer of the Ph.D. Program in Urban Education at the City University of New York.

He has been a co-editor of and reviewer for several professional journals. He pursues broad research interests, including Postmodernism, Critical Theory, Masculism, Sexualities, Discourse Analysis, Social semiotics, Ecosocial Dynamics, and Complex Systems.

He has done significant research in linguistics, literacy, science education and semiotics. His best known work, Talking Science, has influenced research methods and practice in science education, and was translated into Spanish as Aprender a hablar ciencia.

== Select bibliography ==
- Talking Science: Language, Learning, and Values. Ablex Publishing, 1990.
- Textual Politics: Discourse and Social Dynamics. Taylor & Francis, 1995.
- "Intertextuality and Educational Research." Linguistics and Education 4(3–4): 257–268, 1992.
- "Across the Scales of Time: Artifacts, Activities, and Meanings in Ecosocial Systems" Mind, Culture, and Activity 7(4): 273–290. 2000.
