= Systemic functional linguistics =

Approach that considers language as a social semiotic system

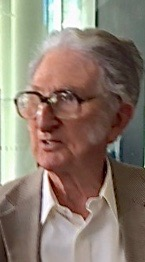
Michael Halliday at his 90th-birthday symposium, 17 February 2015

Systemic functional linguistics (SFL) is an approach to linguistics, among functional linguistics, that considers language as a social semiotic system.

It was devised by Michael Halliday, who took the notion of system from J. R. Firth, his teacher (Halliday, 1961). Firth proposed that systems refer to possibilities subordinated to structure; Halliday "liberated" choice from structure and made it the central organising dimension of SFL. In more technical terms, while many approaches to linguistic description place structure and the syntagmatic axis foremost, SFL adopts the paradigmatic axis as its point of departure. Systemic foregrounds Saussure's "paradigmatic axis" in understanding how language works. For Halliday, a central theoretical principle is then that any act of communication involves choices. Language is above all a system; SFL maps the choices available in any language variety using its representation tool of a "system network".

Functional signifies the proposition that language evolved under pressure of the functions that the language system must serve. Functions are taken to have left their mark on the structure and organisation of language at all levels, which is achieved via metafunctions. Metafunction is uniquely defined in SFL as the "organisation of the functional framework around systems", i.e., choices. This is a significant difference from other "functional" approaches, such as Dik's functional grammar (FG, or as now often termed, functional discourse grammar) and role and reference grammar. To avoid confusion, the full designation—systemic functional linguistics—is typically used, rather than functional grammar or functional linguistics.

For Halliday, all languages involve three simultaneously generated metafunctions: one construes experience of our outer and inner reality as well as logical relations between phenomena (ideational); another enacts social relations (interpersonal relations); and a third weaves together these two functions to create text (textual—the wording).

== Multidimensional semiotic system ==
The point of departure for Halliday's work in linguistics has been the simple question: "how does language work?". Across his career he has probed the nature of language as a social semiotic system; that is, as a resource for meaning across the many and constantly changing contexts of human interaction. In 2003, he published a paper setting out the accumulated principles of his theory, which arose as he engaged with many different language-related problems. These principles, he wrote, "emerged as the by-product of those engagements as I struggled with particular problems", as various as literary analysis and machine translation. Halliday has tried, then, to develop a linguistic theory and description that is applicable to any context of human language. His theory and descriptions are based on these principles, on the basis that they are required to explain the complexity of human language. There are five principles:

- Paradigmatic dimension: Meaning is choice, i.e. users select from "options that arise in the environment of other options", and that "the power of language resides in its organisation as a huge network of interrelated choices" (see Linguistic system)
- Stratification dimension. In the evolution of language from primary to higher-order semiotic, "a space was created in which meanings could be organized in their own terms, as a purely abstract network of interrelations". Between the content of form-pairing of simple semiotic systems emerged the "organizational space" referred to as lexicogrammar. This development put language on the road to becoming an apparently infinite meaning-making system.
- Metafunctional dimension. Language displays "functional complementarity". In other words, it has evolved under the human need to make meanings about the world around and inside us, at the same time that it is the means for creating and maintaining our interpersonal relations. These motifs are two modes of meaning in discourse—what Halliday terms the "ideational" and the "interpersonal" metafunctions. They are organised via a third mode of meaning, the textual metafunction, which acts on the other two modes to create a coherent flow of discourse.
- Syntagmatic dimension. Language unfolds syntagmatically, as structure laid down in time (spoken) or space (written). This structure involves units on different ranks within each stratum of the language system. Within the lexicogrammar, for example, the largest is the clause, and the smallest the morpheme; intermediate between these ranks are the ranks of group/phrase and of word.
- Instantiation dimension. All of these resources are, in turn, "predicated on the vector of instantiation", defined as "the relation between an instance and the system that lies behind it". Instantiation is a formal relationship between potential and actual. Systemic functional theory assumes a very intimate relationship of continual feedback between instance and system: thus using the system may change that system.

== The notion of system in linguistics ==
As the name suggests, the notion of system is a defining aspect of systemic functional linguistics. In linguistics, the term "system" can be traced back to Ferdinand de Saussure, who noticed the roughly corresponding paradigms between signifying forms and signified values. The paradigmatic principle of organization was established in semiotics by Saussure, whose concept of value (viz. "valeur") and of signs as terms in a system "showed up paradigmatic organization as the most abstract dimension of meaning". However, Halliday points out that system in the sense J.R. Firth and he himself used it was different from Saussure's. In their case, system does not stand for a list of signifying forms corresponding to a list of signified values. Instead, Firth and Halliday described systems as contrasting options in value realised by contrasting options in form where the options are not the entire form and the entire value but features thereof. In this sense, linguistic systems are a background for formal features, i.e. features of structure. Here, the most general linguistic system is human adult language itself since it is a system of options whereby humans choose whether to speak in English, in Chinese, in Spanish or in another variety of language. In this sense, language is a system ("the system of language") not only as proposed by Hjelmslev., but also as a system of options. In this context, Jay Lemke describes human language as an open, dynamic system, which evolves together with the human species.

In this use of system, grammatical or other features of language are best understood when described as sets of options. According to Halliday, "The most abstract categories of the grammatical description are the systems together with their options (systemic features). A systemic grammar differs from other functional grammars (and from all formal grammars) in that it is paradigmatic: a system is a paradigmatic set of alternative features, of which one must be chosen if the entry condition is satisfied."

System was a feature of Halliday's early theoretical work on language. He considered it one of four fundamental categories for the theory of grammar—the others being unit, structure, and class. The category of system was invoked to account for "the occurrence of one rather than another from among a number of like events". At that time, Halliday defined grammar as "that level of linguistic form at which operate closed systems".

In adopting a system perspective on language, systemic functional linguistics have been part of a more general 20th- and 21st-century reaction against atomistic approaches to science, in which an essence is sought within smaller and smaller components of the phenomenon under study. In systems thinking, any delineated object of study is defined by its relations to other units postulated by the theory. In systemic functional linguistics, this has been described as the trinocular perspective. Thus a descriptive category must be defended from three perspectives: from above ("what does it construe?" "what effect does it have in a context of use?"), below ("how is this function realised?") and round about ("what else is in the neighbourhood?" "what other things does this thing have to interact with?"). This gives systemic functional linguistics an affinity with studies of complex systems.

== System network in systemic linguistics ==
The label systemic is related to the system networks used in the description of human languages. System networks capture the dimension of choice at each stratum of the linguistic system to which they are applied. The system networks of the lexicogrammar make up systemic functional grammar. A system network is a theoretical tool to describe the sets of options available in a language variety; it represents abstract choice and does not correspond to a notion of actual choice or make psychological claims. Formally system networks correspond to type lattices in formal lattice theory, although they are occasionally erroneously mistaken for flowcharts or directed decision trees. Such directionality is always only a property of particular implementations of the general notion and may be made for performance reasons in, for example, computational modelling. System networks commonly employ multiple inheritance and "simultaneous" systems, or choices, which therefore combine to generate very large descriptive spaces...

== See also ==
- Michael Halliday
- Ruqaiya Hasan
- Mary Macken-Horarik
- C. M. I. M. Matthiessen
- J. R. Martin
- Mary J. Schleppegrell
- Robin Fawcett
- Leila Barbara
- Systemic functional grammar
- Nominal group (language)
