= Michael Halliday =

British linguist (1925–2018)

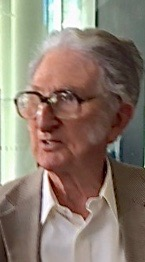
- Halliday at his 90th-birthday symposium, 2015
- Born: Michael Alexander Kirkwood Halliday; 13 April 1925; Leeds, England
- Died: 15 April 2018 (aged 93); Sydney, Australia
- Other name: M. A. K. Halliday
- Education: University of London; Peking University
- Known for: Systemic functional linguistics
- Spouse: Ruqaiya Hasan (died 2015)
- Scientific career
- Fields: Linguistics
- Workplaces: University of Edinburgh; University of Cambridge; Stanford University; University of Sydney

Michael Alexander Kirkwood Halliday (13 April 1925 – 15 April 2018), often credited as M. A. K. Halliday, was a British linguist who developed the internationally influential systemic functional linguistics (SFL) model of language. His grammatical descriptions go by the name of systemic functional grammar. Halliday described language as a semiotic system, "not in the sense of a system of signs, but a systemic resource for meaning". For Halliday, language was a "meaning potential"; by extension, he defined linguistics as the study of "how people exchange meanings by 'languaging'". Halliday described himself as a generalist, meaning that he tried "to look at language from every possible vantage point", and has described his work as "wander[ing] the highways and byways of language". But he said that "to the extent that I favoured any one angle, it was the social: language as the creature and creator of human society".

Halliday's grammar differs markedly from traditional accounts that emphasise the classification of individual words (e.g. noun, verb, pronoun, preposition) in formal, written sentences in a restricted number of "valued" varieties of English. Halliday's model conceives grammar explicitly as how meanings are coded into wordings, in both spoken and written modes in all varieties and registers of a language. Three strands of grammar operate simultaneously. They concern (i) the interpersonal exchange between speaker and listener, and writer and reader; (ii) representation of our outer and inner worlds; and (iii) the wording of these meanings in cohesive spoken and written texts, from within the clause up to whole texts. Notably, the grammar embraces intonation in spoken language. Halliday's seminal Introduction to Functional Grammar (first edition, 1985) spawned a new research discipline and related pedagogical approaches. By far the most progress has been made in English, but the international growth of communities of SFL scholars has led to the adaptation of Halliday's advances to some other languages.

== Biography ==
Halliday was born and raised in England. His parents nurtured his fascination for language: his mother, Winifred, had studied French, and his father, Wilfred, was a dialectologist, a dialect poet, and an English teacher with a love for grammar and Elizabethan drama. In 1942, Halliday volunteered for the National Services' foreign language training course. He was selected to study Chinese on the strength of his success in being able to differentiate tones. After 18 months' training, he spent a year in India working with the Chinese Intelligence Unit doing counter-intelligence work. In 1945 he was brought back to London to teach Chinese. He took a BA honours degree in modern Chinese language and literature (Mandarin) through the University of London—an external degree for which he studied in China. He then lived for three years in China, where he studied under Luo Changpei at Peking University and under Wang Li at Lingnan University, before returning to take a PhD in Chinese linguistics at Cambridge under the supervision of Gustav Hallam and then J.R. Firth. Having taught languages for 13 years, he changed his field of specialisation to linguistics, and developed systemic functional linguistics, including systemic functional grammar, elaborating on the foundations laid by his British teacher J.R. Firth and a group of European linguists of the early 20th century, the Prague school. His seminal paper on this model was published in 1961.

Halliday's first academic position was as an assistant lecturer in Chinese, at Cambridge University, from 1954 to 1958. In 1958 he moved to the University of Edinburgh, where he was a lecturer in general linguistics until 1960, and a reader from 1960 to 1963. From 1963 to 1965 he was the director of the Communication Research Centre at University College, London. During 1964, he was also a Linguistic Society of America Professor, at Indiana University. From 1965 to 1971 he was a professor of linguistics at UCL. In 1972–73 he was a fellow at the Center for Advanced Study in the Behavioural Sciences, Stanford, and in 1973–74 professor of linguistics at the University of Illinois. In 1974 he briefly moved back to Britain to be a professor of language and linguistics at Essex University. In 1976 he moved to Australia as a foundation professor of linguistics at the University of Sydney, where he remained until he retired in 1987.

Halliday worked in multiple areas of linguistics, both theoretical and applied, and was especially concerned with applying the understanding of the basic principles of language to the theory and practices of education. In 1987 he was awarded the status of emeritus Professor at the University of Sydney and Macquarie University, Sydney. He has honorary doctorates from the University of Birmingham (1987), York University (1988), the University of Athens (1995), Macquarie University (1996), Lingnan University (1999)，the University of British Columbia (2007)， and Beijing Normal University(2011).

He died in Sydney of natural causes on 15 April 2018 at the age of 93.

== Linguistic theory and description ==
Halliday's grammatical theory and descriptions gained wide recognition after the publication of the first edition of his book An Introduction to Functional Grammar in 1985. A second edition was published in 1994, and then a third, in which he collaborated with Christian Matthiessen, in 2004. A fourth edition was published in 2014. Halliday's conception of grammar – or "lexicogrammar", a term he coined to argue that lexis and grammar are part of the same phenomenon – is based on a more general theory of language as a social semiotic resource, or "meaning potential" (see Systemic functional linguistics). Halliday follows Hjelmslev and Firth in distinguishing theoretical from descriptive categories in linguistics. He argues that "theoretical categories, and their inter-relations, construe an abstract model of language ... they are interlocking and mutually defining. The theoretical architecture derives from work on the description of natural discourse, and as such 'no very clear line is drawn between '(theoretical) linguistics' and 'applied linguistics'". So the theory "is continually evolving as it is brought to bear on solving problems of a research or practical nature". Halliday contrasts theoretical categories with descriptive categories, defined as "categories set up in the description of particular languages". His descriptive work has focused on English and Mandarin.

Halliday argues against some claims about language associated with the generative tradition. Language, he argues, "cannot be equated with 'the set of all grammatical sentences', whether that set is conceived of as finite or infinite". He rejects the use of formal logic in linguistic theories as "irrelevant to the understanding of language" and the use of such approaches as "disastrous for linguistics". On Chomsky specifically, he writes that "imaginary problems were created by the whole series of dichotomies that Chomsky introduced, or took over unproblematized: not only syntax/semantics but also grammar/lexis, language/thought, competence/performance. Once these dichotomies had been set up, the problem arose of locating and maintaining the boundaries between them."

== Studies of grammar ==
=== Fundamental categories ===
Halliday's first major work on grammar was "Categories of the Theory of Grammar", in the journal Word in 1961. In this paper, he argued for four "fundamental categories" in grammar: unit, structure, class, and system. These categories are "of the highest order of abstraction", but he defended them as necessary to "make possible a coherent account of what grammar is and of its place in language" In articulating unit, Halliday proposed the notion of a rank scale. The units of grammar form a hierarchy, a scale from largest to smallest, which he proposed as a sentence, clause, group/phrase, word, and morpheme. Halliday defined structure as "likeness between events in successivity" and as "an arrangement of elements ordered in places". He rejects a view of the structure as "strings of classes, such as nominal group + verbalgroup + nominal group", describing structure instead as "configurations of functions, where the solidarity is organic".

=== Grammar as systemic ===
Halliday's early paper shows that the notion of "system" has been part of his theory from its origins. Halliday explains this preoccupation in the following way: "It seemed to me that explanations of linguistic phenomena needed to be sought in relationships among systems rather than among structures – in what I once called "deep paradigms" – since these were essentially where speakers made their choices". Halliday's "systemic grammar" is a semiotic account of grammar, because of this orientation to choice. Every linguistic act involves choice, and choices are made on many scales. Systemic grammars draw on system networks as their primary representation tool as a consequence. For instance, a major clause must display some structure that is the formal realisation of a choice from the system of "voice", i.e. it must be either "middle" or "effective", where "effective" leads to the further choice of "operative" (otherwise known as 'active') or "receptive" (otherwise known as "passive").

=== Grammar as functional ===
Halliday's grammar is not just systemic, but systemic functional. He argues that the explanation of how language works "needed to be grounded in a functional analysis since language had evolved in the process of carrying out certain critical functions as human beings interacted with their ... 'eco-social' environment". Halliday's early grammatical descriptions of English, called "Notes on Transitivity and Theme in English – Parts 1–3" include reference to "four components in the grammar of English representing four functions that the language as a communication system is required to carry out: the experiential, the logical, the discoursal and the speech functional or interpersonal". The "discoursal" function was renamed the "textual function". In this discussion of functions of language, Halliday draws on the work of Bühler and Malinowski. Halliday's notion of language functions, or "metafunctions", became part of his general linguistic theory.

== Language in society ==
The final volume of Halliday's 10 volumes of Collected Papers is called Language in society, reflecting his theoretical and methodological connection to language as first and foremost concerned with "acts of meaning". This volume contains many of his early papers, in which he argues for a deep connection between language and social structure. Halliday argues that language does not exist merely to reflect social structure. For instance, he writes:

... if we say that linguistic structure "reflects" social structure, we are really assigning to language a role that is too passive ... Rather we should say that linguistic structure is the realization of social structure, actively symbolizing it in a process of mutual creativity. Because it stands as a metaphor for society, language has the property of not only transmitting the social order but also maintaining and potentially modifying it. (This is undoubtedly the explanation of the violent attitudes that under certain social conditions come to be held by one group towards the speech of others.)

== Studies in child language development ==
In enumerating his claims about the trajectory of children's language development, Halliday eschews the metaphor of "acquisition", in which language is considered a static product that the child takes on when sufficient exposure to natural language enables "parameter setting". By contrast, for Halliday what the child develops is a "meaning potential". Learning language is Learning how to mean, the name of his well-known early study of a child's language development.

Halliday (1975) identifies seven functions that language has for children in their early years. For Halliday, children are motivated to develop language because it serves certain purposes or functions for them. The first four functions help the child to satisfy physical, emotional, and social needs. Halliday calls them instrumental, regulatory, interactional, and personal functions.

- Instrumental: This is when children use language to express their needs (e.g. "Want juice.")
- Regulatory: This is where language is used to tell others what to do (e.g. "Go away.")
- Interactional: Here language is used to make contact with others and form relationships (e.g. "Love you, Mummy.")
- Personal: This is the use of language to express feelings, opinions, and individual identity (e.g. "Me good girl.")

The next three functions are heuristic, imaginative, and representational, all helping the child to come to terms with his or her environment.

- Heuristic: This is when language is used to gain knowledge about the environment (e.g. "What is the tractor doing?")
- Imaginative: Here language is used to tell stories and jokes and to create an imaginary environment.
- Representational: The use of language to convey facts and information.

According to Halliday, as the child moves into the mother tongue, these functions give way to the generalised "metafunctions" of language. In this process, in between the two levels of the simple protolanguage system (the "expression" and "content" pairing of the Saussure's sign), an additional level of content is inserted. Instead of one level of content, there are now two: lexicogrammar and semantics. The "expression" plane also now consists of two levels: phonetics and phonology.

Halliday's work is sometimes seen as representing a competing viewpoint to the formalist approach of Noam Chomsky. Halliday's stated concern is with "naturally occurring language in actual contexts of use" in a large typological range of languages. Critics of Chomsky often characterise his work, by contrast, as focused on English with Platonic idealisation, a characterisation that Chomskyans reject (see Universal Grammar).

== Ordered typology of systems ==
Halliday proposed an ordered typology of systems to account for different types of complex systems operating in different phenomenal realms.

He proposed four types of system, in order of increasing complexity—systems of a higher order encompass systems of a lower order:

- Material systems:
1. Physical systems: First-order systems, the oldest and widest type of system, having emerged with the Big Bang. They are organized by composition and governed by the laws of physics.
2. Biological systems: Second-order systems. They are defined as physical systems plus life, making individuation and evolution possible. They are organized by functional composition (e.g. an organ is a group of tissues serving a similar function).
- Immaterial systems:
1. Social systems: Third-order systems. They are biological systems plus social order (or value), organizing biological populations (human or otherwise) into social groups and defining the division of labour among them.
2. Semiotic systems: Fourth order systems. They are social systems plus meaning, such as verbal language, gesture, posture, dress, painting, architecture, etc. They further divide into primary semiotic systems, which can only carry meaning, and high-order semiotic systems, which can create meaning.

== Selected works ==
- Halliday, M. A. K.; McIntosh, Angus; Strevens, Peter (1964). The Linguistic Sciences and Language Teaching. London: Longmans, Green and Co., Ltd.
- McIntosh, Angus; Halliday, M. A. K. (1966). Patterns of language: papers in general, descriptive and applied linguistics. London: Longmans, Green and Co. Ltd.
- 1967–68. "Notes on Transitivity and Theme in English, Parts 1–3", Journal of Linguistics 3(1), 37–81; 3(2), 199–244; 4(2), 179–215.
- 1973. Explorations in the Functions of Language at Google Books, London: Edward Arnold.
- 1975. Learning How to Mean at Google Books, London: Edward Arnold.
- With C.M.I.M. Matthiessen, 2004. An Introduction to Functional Grammar at Google Books, 3d edn. London: Edward Arnold (4th edn. 2014).
- 2002. Linguistic Studies of Text and Discourse at Google Books, ed. Jonathan Webster, Continuum International Publishing.
- 2003. On Language and Linguistics at Google Books, ed. Jonathan Webster, Continuum International Publishing.
- 2005. On Grammar at Google Books, ed. Jonathan Webster, Continuum International Publishing.
- 2006. The Language of Science at Google Books, Jonathan Webster (ed.), Continuum International Publishing.
- 2006. Computational and Quantitative Studies at Google Books, ed. Jonathan Webster, Continuum International Publishing.
- With W. S. Greaves, 2008. Intonation in the Grammar of English at Google Books, London: Equinox.

== See also ==
- Thematic equative
- Cline (linguistics) which notes Halliday's concept "cline of instantiation"
- Nominal group
- Halliday's ordered typology of systems

== Sources and external links ==
- Systemic functional linguistics
- Halliday and SFL Overview
- Interview of Halliday by G. Kress, R. Hasan and J. R. Martin, May 1986
- Halliday's Collected Papers in 10 volumes
- Michael Halliday's 2010 talk at UBC on YouTube
- Halliday, M.A.K. Explorations in the Functions of Language. London: Edward Arnold, 1973.
- Halliday, M.A.K., and C.M.I.M. Matthiessen. An Introduction to Functional Grammar. 3d ed. London: Arnold, 2004.
- Obituary, University of Sydney, 16 April 2018
- Obituary, Australian Systemic Functional Linguistics Society, 16 April 2018
