= Copenhagen School (linguistics) =

Danish school of linguistics

The Copenhagen School is a group of scholars dedicated to the study of linguistics, centered on Louis Hjelmslev (1899–1965) and the Linguistic Circle of Copenhagen (French: Cercle Linguistique de Copenhague, Danish: Lingvistkredsen), founded by him and Viggo Brøndal (1887–1942). In the mid-twentieth century, the Copenhagen School was one of the most important centres of linguistic structuralism, together with the Geneva School and the Prague School. In the late 20th and early 21st centuries, the Copenhagen school's approach to linguistics has evolved from purely structural to functionalist, culminating in Danish functional linguistics—which, despite the "functional" moniker, nonetheless incorporates many insights from the founders of the Linguistic Circle.

== History ==
The Copenhagen School of Linguistics evolved around Louis Hjelmslev and his developing theory of language, glossematics. In 1931, he and Viggo Brøndal together founded the Cercle Linguistique de Copenhague, a group of linguists based on the model of the Prague Linguistic Circle. Within the Cercle, the ideas of Brøndal and Hjelmslev were not always compatible; Hjelmslev’s more formalist approach attracted a group of followers—principal among them Hans Jørgen Uldall and Eli Fischer-Jørgensen—who would strive to apply Hjelmslev's abstract ideas on the nature of language to analyses of actual linguistic data.

Hjelmslev’s objective was to establish a framework for understanding communication as a formal system, and an important part of this was the development of precise terminology to describe the different parts of linguistic systems and their interrelations. The basic theoretical framework, called “Glossematics”, was laid out in Hjelmslev’s two main works: Prolegomena to a Theory of Language and Résumé of a Theory of Language. However, since Hjelmslev's death in 1965 left his theories mostly on the programmatic level, the group that had formed around Hjelmslev and his glossematic theory dispersed—while the Copenhagen Linguistic Circle continued to exist, it was not really a "school" united by a common theoretical perspective.

In 1989, a group of Circle members, inspired by the advances in cognitive linguistics and the functionalist theories of Simon C. Dik, founded the school of Danish Functional Grammar, aiming to combine the ideas of Hjelmslev and Brøndal, and those of other important Danish linguists, such as Paul Diderichsen and Otto Jespersen, with modern functional linguistics. Among the prominent members of this new generation of the Copenhagen School were Peter Harder, Elisabeth Engberg-Pedersen, Frans Gregersen, Una Canger and Michael Fortescue. The basic work of the school is Dansk Funktionel Grammatik (Danish Functional Grammar) by Harder (2006). Recent developments in the school include Ole Nedergaard Thomsen’s Functional Discourse Pragmatics.

In the following, the two stages of the Copenhagen School will be described as (1) the glossematic school, and (2) Danish functional linguistics.

== The glossematic school ==
Brøndal emphasised that formal properties of a system should be kept apart from its substance. Accordingly, Hjelmslev—as the key figure of the Copenhagen School in the 1930s—developed the formal linguistic theory which later became known as glossematics (meaning something like "language-form study"; from glossa-, "language", and -eme). He formulated his linguistic theory together with Hans Jørgen Uldall as an attempt to analyse the expression (phonetics and grammar) and the meaning of a language on a coherent basis. He assumed that spoken or natural language was not the only instrument of communication (consider, e.g., sign language), and he was interested in the most general theory of signs and communication—semiotics or semiology.

More than the other schools, the Glossematic School referred to the teachings of Saussure, even though it was in many aspects connected with older traditions. Thus, it tried once more to combine logic and grammar. At any rate, Hjelmslev had taken over the psychological interpretation of the linguistic sign and thereby extended his study of the sign further than language as such.

The principal ideas of the school are:

- A language consists of content and expression.
- A language consists of a succession and a system.
- Content and expression are interconnected by commutation.
- There are certain relations in the succession and the system.
- There are no one-to-one correspondents between content and expression, but the signs may be divided into smaller components.

Even more than Saussure, the Copenhagen School is interested in the langue rather than parole. It represented in a pure form the idea that language is a form and not a substance. It studied the relational system within the language on a higher level of abstraction.

== Acta Linguistica Hafniensia ==
Acta Linguistica Hafniensia is an academic journal run in collaboration with the Linguistic Circle of Copenhagen. It was started in 1939 by Viggo Brøndal and Louis Hjelmslev and originally focused on structural linguistics. Editors have included Peter Harder, Hartmut Haberland and Lars Heltoft.

== Danish functional linguistics ==
The school of Danish functional linguistics (DFL) was developed in an attempt to combine modern functional grammar and cognitive linguistics with the best ideas and concepts of the earlier structuralist school. Like Hjelmslev and Saussure, the approach insists on the basic structural division of communication in planes of content and expression. Like Simon Dik and other functionalist grammarians, Danish functionalists also insist that language is—most fundamentally—a means of communication between humans, and is hence best understood and analysed through its communicative function.

When analysing linguistic utterances, the content and expression planes are analysed separately, with the expression plane being analysed through traditional structural methods and the content plane being analysed mostly through methods from semantics and pragmatics. However, it is assumed that structures on the expression plane mirror structures on the content plane. This can be seen in the parallelism between, (a), the syntactic structure of sentences as described by the Diderichsen model, which divides utterances into a foundation field (sentence theme), a nexus field (the finite verb and its arguments/modifiers), and a content field (non-finite verb and object thereof); and, (b), the pragmatic structure of utterances, which may often be analysed as comprising a foundation field (for discourse-pragmatic functions), a nexus field (for illocutionary functions), and a content field (for the linguistic message).

Danish functionalists assume that an utterance is not to be analysed from the minimal units and up, but rather from the maximal units and down, because this best reflects the way that speakers construct utterances: by first choosing what to say in a given situation; then by choosing which words to use; and, finally, by speaking aloud the corresponding sounds.

An example of a two-planed analysis is given below, as applied to the utterance "The book hasn't been read by anyone for a while." On the content plane, the utterance consists of: the topic (in this case, "the book")—that which the sentence is about, and which links it to the larger discourse; the declarative illocutionary force of the utterance (conveyed, here, by "hasn't"); and the predicate ("hasn't been read by anyone for a while"), which is the message to be communicated. On the expression plane, the elements comprising the sentence are characterized as being: "the book", a noun phrase with a determiner; "hasn't", a finite verb with a negational adverb; and a passive verbal phrase—"been read"—with an agent, "by anyone", and a time adverb, "for a while".

Utterance:	The book	hasn't	been read by anyone for a while.
Content	Topic (known information)	Declarative illocutionary force	Predicate ("to be read") + Specifier ("by anyone") + Time-frame ("for a while")
Expression	Determiner + Noun	Nexus: Intransitive verb + Present tense + Negation	Passive verb + Agent + Time adverb

An example of a descriptive work within Danish functional linguistics is the 2011 grammar of Danish by Erik Hansen & Lars Heltoft, Grammatik over det Danske Sprog ("Grammar over the Danish Language").

== Bibliography ==
- Harder, Peter (2006): “Funktionel lingvistik — eksemplificeret ved dansk funktionel lingvistik”. NyS 34/35. 92-130. (Multivers. Det akademiske Forlag.)
- Harder, Peter. Dansk funktionel Lingvistik: en Introduktion. (in Danish)
- Engberg-Pedersen, Elisabeth; Michael Fortescue; Peter Harder; Lars Heltoft; Lisbeth Falster Jakobsen (eds.). (1996) Content, expression and structure: studies in Danish functional grammar. John Benjamins Publishing Company.
- Harder, Peter. (1996) Functional Semantics: A Theory of Meaning, Structure and Tense in English. (Trends in Linguistics: Studies and Monographs 87). Berlin/New York: Mouton de Gruyter.
