= Americanist phonetic notation =

Phonetic alphabet developed in the 1880s

- Script type: Alphabet
- Period: 1880s to the present
- Languages: phonetic transcription of any language

Related scripts
- Parent systems: Latin alphabet, augmented by Greek: Americanist phonetic notation

Americanist phonetic notation, also known as the North American Phonetic Alphabet (NAPA), the Americanist Phonetic Alphabet and the American Phonetic Alphabet (APA), is a system of phonetic notation originally developed by European and American anthropologists and language scientists (many of whom were Neogrammarians) for the phonetic and phonemic transcription of indigenous languages of the Americas and for languages of Europe. It is still commonly used by linguists working on, among others, Slavic languages, Semitic languages, and the languages of the Caucasus, of India, and of much of Africa. Uralicists, working on Uralic languages, commonly use the similar but distinct Uralic Phonetic Alphabet.

Despite its name, APA has always been widely used outside the Americas. For example, a version of it is the standard transcription of Arabic for articles published in the Zeitschrift der Deutschen Morgenländischen Gesellschaft, the journal of the German Oriental Society.

Diacritics are more widely used in Americanist notation than in the International Phonetic Alphabet (IPA), which seeks to use as few diacritics as possible for phonemic distinctions, retaining them primarily for the dental–alveolar distinction. Americanist notation relies on diacritics to distinguish multiple distinctions that are phonemic in the languages it transcribes. On the other hand, Americanist notation uses single letters for most coronal affricates, whereas the IPA generally requires digraphs. Otherwise Americanist notation has grown increasingly similar to IPA, and has abandoned many of the more obscure letters it once employed.

== Summary contrast with the IPA alphabet ==
Certain symbols in APA were once identical to those of the International Phonetic Alphabet, but have become obsolete in the latter, such as ⟨ι⟩. Over the years, APA has drawn closer to the IPA. This can be seen, for example, in a comparison of Edward Sapir's earlier and later works. However, there remain significant differences. Among these are:

- ⟨y⟩ for [j], ⟨ñ⟩ for [ɲ], ⟨c⟩ or ⟨ȼ⟩ for [t͡s], ⟨ƛ⟩ for [t͡ɬ] and ⟨ł⟩ for [ɬ]
- Palato-alveolar ⟨č ǰ š ž⟩ and sometimes alveopalatal ⟨ć ś ź ń⟩
- Advancing diacritic (inverted breve, e.g. g̯ ) for dentals and palatals (apart from non-sibilant dental ⟨θ ð⟩), and retracting diacritic (a dot, e.g. ṣ g̣) for retroflex and uvulars (apart from uvular ⟨q⟩)
- ⟨r⟩ or ⟨ř⟩ for a flap and ⟨r̃⟩ for a trill
- Ogonek for nasalization
- Dot over vowel for centering, two dots (diaeresis) over a vowel to change fronting (for front rounded vowels and unrounded back vowels)
- Acute and grave accents over vowels for stress

== History ==
John Wesley Powell used an early set of phonetic symbols in his publications (particularly Powell 1880) on American language families, although he chose symbols which had their origins in work by other phoneticians and American writers (e.g., Pickering 1820; Cass 1821a, 1821b; Hale 1846; Lepsius 1855, 1863; Gibbs 1861; and Powell 1877). The influential anthropologist Franz Boas used a somewhat different set of symbols (Boas 1911). In 1916, a publication by the American Anthropological Society greatly expanded upon Boas's alphabet. This same alphabet was discussed and modified in articles by Bloomfield & Bolling (1927) and Herzog et al. (1934). The Americanist notation may be seen in the journals American Anthropologist, International Journal of American Linguistics, and Language. Useful sources explaining the symbols – some with comparisons of the alphabets used at different times – are Campbell (1997:xii-xiii), Goddard (1996:10–16), Langacker (1972:xiii-vi), Mithun (1999:xiii-xv), and Odden (2005).

It is often useful to compare the Americanist tradition with another widespread tradition, the International Phonetic Alphabet (IPA). Americanist phonetic notation does not require a strict harmony among character styles: letters from the Greek and Latin alphabets are used side-by-side. Another contrasting feature is that, to represent some of the same sounds, the Americanist tradition relies heavily on letters modified with diacritics; whereas the IPA, which reserves diacritics for other specific uses, gave Greek and Latin letters new shapes. These differing approaches reflect the traditions' differing philosophies. The Americanist linguists were interested in a phonetic notation that could be easily created from typefaces of existing orthographies. This was seen as more practical and more cost-efficient, as many of the characters chosen already existed in Greek and East European orthographies.

Abercrombie (1991:44–45) recounts the following concerning the Americanist tradition:

In America phonetic notation has had a curious history. Bloomfield used IPA notation in his early book An Introduction to the Study of Language, 1914, and in the English edition of his more famous Language, 1935. But since then, a strange hostility has been shown by many American linguists to IPA notation, especially to certain of its symbols.

An interesting and significant story was once told by Carl Voegelin during a symposium held in New York in 1952 on the present state of anthropology. He told how, at the beginning of the 1930s, he was being taught phonetics by, as he put it, a "pleasant Dane", who made him use the IPA symbol for sh in ship, among others. Some while later he used those symbols in some work on an American Indian language he had done for Sapir. When Sapir saw the work he "simply blew up", Voegelin said, and demanded that in future Voegelin should use 's wedge' (as š was called), instead of the IPA symbol.

I have no doubt that the "pleasant Dane" was H. J. Uldall, one of Jones's most brilliant students, who was later to become one of the founders of glossematics, with Louis Hjelmslev. Uldall did a great deal of research into Californian languages, especially into Maidu or Nisenan. Most of the texts he collected were not published during his lifetime. It is ironic that when they were published, posthumously, by the University of California Press, the texts were "reorthographized", as the editor's introduction put it: the IPA symbols Uldall had used were removed and replaced by others.

What is strange is that the IPA symbols seem so obviously preferable to the Americanist alternatives, the 'long s' to the 's wedge', for example. As Jones often pointed out, in connected texts, for the sake of legibility diacritics should be avoided as far as possible. Many Americanist texts give the impression of being overloaded with diacritics.

One may wonder why there should be such a hostility in America to IPA notation. I venture to suggest a reason for this apparently irrational attitude. The hostility derives ultimately from the existence, in most American universities, of Speech Departments, which we do not have in Britain. Speech Departments tend to be well-endowed, large, and powerful. In linguistic and phonetic matters they have a reputation for being predominantly prescriptive, and tend to be considered by some therefore to be not very scholarly. In their publications and periodicals the notation they use, when writing of pronunciation, is that of the IPA. My belief is that the last thing a member of an American Linguistics Department wants is to be mistaken for a member of a Speech Department; but if he were to use IPA notation in his writings he would certainly lay himself open to the suspicion that he was.

== Alphabet ==
=== Consonants ===
There is no central authority. The Western Institute for Endangered Language Documentation (WIELD) has recommended the following conventions since 2016:

Advanced is ⟨C̯⟩ and retracted is ⟨C̣⟩. Geminate is ⟨C꞉⟩ or ⟨CC⟩. Glottalization, including ejectives, uses a combining diacritic, e.g. ⟨č̓⟩ or ⟨m̓⟩. Palatalization is written ⟨Cʸ⟩. Labialization, velarization, aspiration, voicelessness and prenasalization are as in the IPA, as are pharyngeals, epiglottals, glottals, implosives and clicks.

Differences from the IPA fall into a few broad categories: use of c j λ ƛ for affricates; of ⟨Č⟩ and ⟨Ć⟩ for the palato-alveolar and alveolo-palatals, respectively; of the diacritics ⟨◌̯⟩ and ⟨◌̣⟩ to derive dental and retroflex articulations from the default alveolar, and palatal and uvular from the default velar; of y for its English consonantal value; and of r for a tap rather than a trill.

WIELD (2016) recommendations for APA consonants
			Bilabial	Labio- dental	Dental	Alveolar	Retro- flex	Palato- alveolar	Alveo- palatal	Palatal	Velar	Uvular	Pharyn- geal	Glottal
Plosive		voiceless	p		t̯	t	ṭ			k̯	k	q		ʔ
Plosive		voiced	b		d̯	d	ḍ			ɡ̯	ɡ	ɡ̇		
Affricate	median	voiceless		pf	tθ	c	c̣	č	ć		kx	qx̣		
Affricate	median	voiceless		pf	c̯	c	c̣	č	ć		kx	qx̣		
Affricate	median	voiced			dð	dz	dẓ	ǰ	dź					
Affricate	median	voiced			dz̯	dz	dẓ	ǰ	dź					
Affricate	lateral	voiceless				ƛ								
Affricate	lateral	voiced				λ								
Fricative	central	voiceless	ɸ	f	θ	s	ṣ	š	ś	x̯	x	x̣	ħ	h
Fricative	central	voiceless	ɸ	f	s̯	s	ṣ	š	ś	x̯	x	x̣	ħ	h
Fricative	central	voiced	β	v	ð	z	ẓ	ž	ź	ɣ̯	ɣ	ɣ̇	ʕ	ɦ
Fricative	central	voiced	β	v	z̯	z	ẓ	ž	ź	ɣ̯	ɣ	ɣ̇	ʕ	ɦ
Fricative	lateral	voiceless				ł				łʸ				
Fricative	lateral	voiced				ɮ								
Nasal			m		n̯	n	ṇ		ń	ñ	ŋ	ŋ̇		
Trill						r̃						ʀ		
Tap					r̯	r	ṛ							
Approximant		central		ʋ		ɹ	ɹ̣			y	ẉ			
Approximant		labialized								ẅ	w			
Approximant		lateral			l̯	l	ḷ			lʸ				

Notes:

- Among the dental fricatives, ⟨θ ð⟩ are slit fricatives (non-sibilant) while ⟨s̯ z̯⟩ are grooved fricatives (sibilant).

==== Rhotics table ====
About 90% of languages have only one rhotic consonant. As a result, rhotic consonants are generally transcribed with the ⟨r⟩ character. This usage is common practice in Americanist and also other notational traditions (such as the IPA). This lack of detail, although economical and phonologically sound, requires a more careful reading of a given language's phonological description to determine the precise phonetics. A list of rhotics is given below.

Common rhotic conventions
	Alveolar	Retroflex/Uvular
Approximant	r	ṛ
Flap	ř	ṛ̌
Tap	ᴅ	ᴅ̣
Trill	r̃	ṛ̃

Other flaps are ⟨ň⟩, ⟨l͏̌⟩, etc.

==== Common alternate symbols ====
There are many alternate symbols seen in Americanist transcription. Below are some equivalent symbols matched with the symbols shown in the consonant chart above.

- ⟨ȼ⟩ may be used for ⟨c⟩ (= ⟨ts⟩), or for ⟨ð⟩.
- ⟨č̣⟩ may be used for ⟨c̣⟩ (= ⟨tṣ⟩).
- ⟨j⟩ may be used for ⟨ʒ⟩ (= ⟨dz⟩).
- ⟨ǰ⟩ may be used for ⟨ǯ⟩ (= ⟨dž⟩).
- ⟨ȷ́⟩ may be used for ⟨ʒ́⟩ (= ⟨dź⟩).
- ⟨ƚ⟩ or ⟨ɫ⟩ may be used for ⟨ł⟩.
- ⟨φ⟩ may be used for ⟨ɸ⟩.
- ⟨G⟩ may be used for ⟨ġ⟩.
- ⟨X⟩ may be used for ⟨x̣⟩.
- ʸ may be used for fronted velars (e.g., kʸ = k̯, gʸ = g̑).
- Some transcriptions superscript the onset of doubly articulated consonants and the release of affricates, e.g. ⟨ᵍɓ⟩, ⟨t̓ᶿ⟩.
- There may be a distinction between laminal retroflex ⟨č̣ ṣ̌ ẓ̌⟩ and apical retroflex ⟨c̣ ṣ ẓ⟩ in some transcriptions.
- The fronting diacritic may be a caret rather than an inverted breve, e.g. dental ⟨ṱ⟩ and palatal ⟨k̭⟩.
- Many researchers use the x-caron (x̌) for the voiceless uvular fricative.
- The use of the standard IPA belted l (ɬ) for the voiceless lateral fricative is becoming increasingly common.

==== Pullum & Ladusaw ====
According to Pullum & Ladusaw (1996), typical Americanist usage at the time was more-or-less as follows. There was, however, little standardization of rhotics, and ⟨ṛ⟩ may be either retroflex or uvular, though as noted above ⟨ṛ⟩ or ⟨ṛ̌⟩ may be a retroflex flap vs ⟨ṛ̃⟩ as a uvular trill. Apart from the ambiguity of the rhotics below, and minor graphic variants (ȼ g γ for c ɡ ɣ and the placement of the diacritic in g̑ γ̑), this is compatible with the WIELD recommendations. Only precomposed affricates are shown below; others may be indicated by digraphs (e.g. ⟨dz⟩).

Typical APA consonant values (1996, not prescriptive)
		Bilabial	Labio- dental	Inter- dental	Dental	Alveolar	Retroflex	Palato- alveolar	Palatal	Velar	Uvular	Pharyn- geal	Glottal
Stop (oral)	voiceless	p			t̯	t	ṭ		k̯	k	q		ʔ
Stop (oral)	voiced	b			d̯	d	ḍ		g̑	g	ġ		
Affricate	voiceless					ȼ		č					
Affricate	voiced							ǰ					
Lateral affricate	voiceless					ƛ							
Lateral affricate	voiced					λ							
Fricative	voiceless	ɸ	f	θ	s̯	s	ṣ	š	x̯	x	x̣	ħ	h
Fricative	voiced	β	v	ð	z̯	z	ẓ	ž	γ̑	γ	γ̇	ʕ	ɦ
Lateral fricative	voiceless					ł							
Nasal		m	ṃ			n	ṇ		ñ	ŋ	ŋ̇		
Rhotic						r	ṛ				ṛ		
Lateral						l	ḷ						
Glide		(w)							y	(w)			

Ejectives and implosives follow the same conventions as in the IPA, apart from the ejective apostrophe being placed above the base letter.

==== Pike ====
Pike (1947) provides the following set of symbols:

Pike (1947) consonant values
		Bilabial	Labio- dental	Inter- dental	Alveolar	Retroflex	Alveolo- palatal	Palatal	Velar	Uvular	Pharyn- geal	Glottal
Stop (oral)	voiceless	p		t̯	t	ṭ		k̯	k	ḳ (q)	ḳ̣	ʔ
Stop (oral)	voiced	b		d̯	d	ḍ		g̯	g	g̣ (G)		
Affricate	voiceless	pᵽ		t̯θ	ts (ȼ)		tš (č)		kx			
Affricate	voiced	bb̶		d̯d̶	dz (ʒ)		dž (ǰ)		gg̶			
Lateral affricate	voiceless				tƚ (ƛ)							
Lateral affricate	voiced				dl (λ)							
Flat fricative	voiceless	ᵽ	f	θ	θ̣			x̯	x	x̣	ḥ	h
Flat fricative	voiced	b̶	v	d̶	ḍ̶			g̶̯	g̶	g̶̣		ɦ
Sibilant	voiceless	w̱̟ (W̟)			s	ṣ , ṣ̌	š					
Sibilant	voiced	w̟			z	ẓ , ẓ̌	ž					
Lateral fricative	voiceless				ƚ̟							
Lateral fricative	voiced				l̟							
Nasal	voiceless	m̱ (M)			ṉ (N)		ṉ̃ (Ñ)		ŋ̱ (Ŋ)			
Nasal	voiced	m			n	ṇ	ñ		ŋ			
Lateral	voiceless				ƚ (L)		ƚʸ					
Lateral	voiced				l	ḷ	lʸ					
Flap	voiceless				ṟ̌							
Flap	voiced				ř , l͏̌	ṛ̌						
Trill	voiceless	p̃			ṟ̃							
Trill	voiced	b̃			r̃					ṛ̃		

Voiceless, voiced and syllabic consonants may also be C̥, C̬ and C̩, as in IPA. Aspirated consonants are Cʻ or C̥ʰ / C̬ʱ. Non-audible release is indicated with superscripting, Vꟲ.

Fortis is C͈ and lenis C᷂. Labialization is C̮ or Cʷ; palatalization is Ꞔ, C⁽ⁱ⁾ or Cʸ; velarization is C⁽ᵘ⁾, and pharyngealization is C̴.

Other airstream mechanisms are pulmonic ingressive C^{←}, ejective Cˀ, implosive Cˁ, click C˂, and lingual ejective (spurt) C˃.

=== Vowels ===
WIELD recommends the following conventions. It does not provide characters for distinctions that are not attested in the literature:

WIELD (2016) recommendations for APA (semi)vowels
		Front		Central		Back	
		unround	round	unround	round	unround	round
Glide		y	ẅ			ẉ	w
Close	higher	i	ü	ɨ	ʉ	ï	u
Close	lower	ɪ	ʊ̈	ᵻ	ʊ̇	ï	ʊ
Mid	higher	e	ö	ə	ȯ	ë	o
Mid	lower	ɛ	ɔ̈	ɛ̇	ɔ̇	ʌ	ɔ
Open	higher	æ	ɒ̈	æ̇	ɔ̇	ɑ	ɒ
Open	lower	a	ɒ̈	a	ɔ̇	ɑ	ɒ

No distinction is made between front and central for the lowest unrounded vowels. Diphthongs are e.g. ⟨ai⟩ or ⟨ay⟩, depending on phonological analysis. Nasal vowels are e.g. ⟨ą⟩. Long vowels are e.g. ⟨a꞉⟩. A three-way length distinction may be ⟨a a꞉ a꞉꞉⟩ or ⟨a a· a꞉⟩. Primary and secondary stress are e.g. ⟨á⟩ and ⟨à⟩. Voicelessness is e.g. ⟨ḁ⟩, as in the IPA. Creak, murmur, rhoticity et al. are as in the IPA.

==== Pullum & Ladusaw ====
According to Pullum & Ladusaw (1996), typical Americanist usage at the time was more-or-less as follows:

Typical APA vowel values (1996, not prescriptive)
		Front		Central		Back	
		unround	round	unround	round	unround	round
Glide		y					w
High	(higher)	i	ü	ɨ	ʉ	ï	u
High	lower	ɪ	ᴜ̈	ᵻ	ᵾ	ɪ̈	ᴜ
Mid	higher	e	ö	ə		ë	o
Mid	lower	ɛ	ɔ̈	ʌ			ɔ
Low		æ	ɔ̈	a/ɑ			ɔ
Lower-Low		a		ɑ			ɒ

==== Pike ====
Pike (1947) presents the following:

Pike (1947) vowel values
		Front		Central		Back	
		unround	round	unround	round	unround	round
Glide		y					w
High	(higher)	i	ü	ɨ	ʉ	ï	u
High	lower	ι	ᴜ̈			ϊ	ᴜ
Mid	higher	e	ö	ə		ë	o
Mid	lower	ɛ	ɔ̈	ʌ			ɔ
Low	higher	æ	ɔ̈				ɔ
Low	lower	a		ɑ			ɒ

Nasalization is V̨ or Vⁿ. A long vowel is V꞉ or V·; half-long is V· (raised dot). Positional variants are fronted V˂, backed V˃, raised V˄ and lowered V˅.

==== Bloch & Trager ====
Bloch & Trager (1942) proposed the following schema, which was never used. They use a single dot for central vowels and a dieresis to reverse backness. The only central vowels with their own letters are ⟨ɨ⟩, which already has a dot, and ⟨ᵻ⟩, which would not be distinct if formed with a dot.

Bloch & Trager (1942) vowel symbols
	Front		Central		Back	
	unround	round	unround	round	unround	round
High	i	ü	ɨ	u̇	ï	u
Lower-high	ɪ	ᴜ̈	ᵻ	ᴜ̇	ɪ̈	ᴜ
Higher-mid	e	ö	ė	ȯ	ë	o
Mean-mid	ᴇ	ꭥ̈	ᴇ̇	ꭥ̇	ᴇ̈	ꭥ
Lower-mid	ɛ	ɔ̈	ɛ̇	ɔ̇	ɛ̈	ɔ
Higher-low	æ	ω̈	æ̇	ω̇	æ̈	ω
Low	a	ɒ̈	ȧ	ɒ̇	ä	ɒ

==== Kurath ====
Kurath (1939) is as follows. Enclosed in parentheses are rounded vowels. Apart from ⟨ʚ, ꭤ⟩ and some differences in alignment, it is essentially the IPA.

Kurath (1939) vowel symbols
	Front	Half- front	Central	Half- back	Back
High	i (y)		ɨ (ʉ)		ɯ (u)
Lower high		ɪ (ʏ)	ᵻ (ᵾ)	ɤ (ᴜ)	
Higher mid	e (ø)	ɘ			(o)
Mid			ə	(ɵ)	
Lower mid	ɛ (ʚ)		ɜ (ɞ)	ʌ	
Higher low	æ		ɐ		(ɔ)
Low	a		ɑ		ꭤ (ɒ)

==== Chomsky & Halle ====
Chomsky & Halle (1968) proposed the following schema, which was hardly ever used. In addition to the table, there was ⟨ə⟩ for an unstressed reduced vowel.

Chomsky & Halle (1968) vowel symbols
		[−back]		[+back]	
		[−round]	[+round]	[−round]	[+round]
[+high −low]	[+tense]	i	ü	ᵻ̄	u
[+high −low]	[−tense]	ɪ	ᴜ̈	ᵻ	ᴜ
[−high −low]	[+tense]	e	ȫ	ʌ̄	ō
[−high −low]	[−tense]	ɛ	ö	ʌ	o
[−high +low]	[+tense]	ǣ	ꭢ̄	ā	ɔ̄
[−high +low]	[−tense]	æ	ꭢ	a	ɔ

=== Tone and prosody ===
Pike (1947) provides the following tone marks:

- High: ⟨V́⟩ or ⟨V¹⟩
- Mid: ⟨V̍⟩ or ⟨V²⟩
- Norm: ⟨V̄⟩ or ⟨V³⟩
- Low: ⟨V̀⟩ or ⟨V⁴⟩

Stress is primary ˈCV or ⟨V́⟩ and secondary ˌCV or ⟨V̀⟩.

Short or intermediate and long or final 'pauses' are ⟨|⟩, ⟨||⟩, as in IPA.

Syllable division is CV.CV, as in IPA, and morpheme boundaries are CV-CV.

=== Older charts ===
==== American Anthropological Association (1916) ====
The following charts were agreed by committee of the American Anthropological Association in 1916.

The vowel chart is based on the classification of H. Sweet. The high central vowels are differentiated by moving the centralizing dot to the left rather than with a cross stroke. IPA equivalents are given in a few cases that may not be clear.

	narrow			wide		
	back	mixed	front	back	mixed	front
high	ï	ı᷸ (= ˙ı)	i	ɩ̈	ɩ᷸ (= ˙ɩ)	ɩ
mid	α [ʌ]		e	a		ε
low					ȧ	ä
high round	u	u̇	ü	υ	υ̇	ϋ
mid round	o	ȯ	ö	ɔ	ɔ̇	ɔ̈
low round	ω	ω̇	ω̈			

	Stops					Spirants			Affricates			Nasals		Laterals			Lateral Affricates			Rolled Consonants		
	Surd	Sonant	Intermed.	Aspirated	Glot- talized	Surd	Sonant	Glot- talized*	Surd	Sonant	Glot- talized*	Surd	Sonant	Surd	Sonant	Glot- talized*	Surd	Sonant	Glot- talized*	Surd	Sonant	Glot- talized*
Bilabial (rounded)	p_{w}	b_{w}	ʙ_{w}	p_{w}ʽ	p̓_{w} , p_{w}ǃ	ƕ	w	ƕǃ	pƕ	bw	pƕǃ	ᴍ_{w}	m_{w}									
Bilabial (unrounded)	p	b	ʙ	pʽ	p̓ , pǃ	φ	β	φǃ	pφ	bβ	pφǃ	ᴍ	m									
Dento- labial						f	v	fǃ	pf	bv	pfǃ											
Inter- dental						θ	ϑ	θǃ	tθ	dϑ	tθǃ											
Linguo- dental	t̯	d̯	ᴅ̯	t̯ʽ	t̯̓ , t̯ǃ	s̯	z̯	s̯ǃ	t̯s	d̯z	t̯sǃ	ɴ̯	n̯	ƚ̯ , ʟ̯	l̯	ƚ̯ǃ	t̯ƚ	d̯l	t̯ƚǃ	ʀ̯	r̯	ʀ̯ǃ
Linguo- alveolar	t	d	ᴅ	tʽ	t̓ , tǃ	s	z	sǃ	ts	dz	tsǃ	ɴ	n	ƚ , ʟ	l	ƚǃ	tƚ	dl	tƚǃ	ʀ	r	ʀǃ
Cerebral	ṭ	ḍ	ᴅ̣	ṭʽ	ṭ̓ , ṭǃ	ṣ	ẓ	ṣǃ	ṭs	ḍz	ṭsǃ	ɴ̣	ṇ	ƚ̣ , ʟ̣	ḷ	ƚ̣ǃ	ṭƚ	ḍl	ṭƚǃ	ʀ̣	ṛ	ʀ̣ǃ
Dorso- dental	τ̯	δ̯	Δ̯	τ̯ʽ	τ̯̓ , τ̯ǃ	σ̯	ζ̯	σ̯ǃ	τ̯σ	δ̯ζ	τ̯σǃ	ν̯	ν̯	ᴧ̯	λ̯	ᴧ̯ǃ	τ̯ᴧ	δ̯λ	τ̯ᴧǃ			
Dorsal	τ	δ	Δ	τʽ	τ̓ , τǃ	σ	ζ	σǃ	τσ	δζ	τσǃ	ν	ν	ᴧ	λ	ᴧǃ	τᴧ	δλ	τᴧǃ			
Dorso- palatal	τ̣	δ̣	Δ̣	τ̣ʽ	τ̣̓ , τ̣ǃ	σ̣	ζ̣	σ̣ǃ	τ̣σ	δ̣ζ	τ̣σǃ	ν̣	ν̣	ᴧ̣	λ̣	ᴧ̣ǃ	τ̣ᴧ	δ̣λ	τ̣ᴧǃ			
Anterior c-sounds	(τ_{y})	(δ_{y})	(Δ_{y})	(τ_{y}ʽ)	(τ̓ , τ_{y}ǃ)	c_{y}	j_{y}	c_{y}ǃ	tc_{y}	dj_{y}	tc_{y}ǃ	( ν _{y})	( ν _{y})	(ᴧ_{y})	(λ_{y})	(ᴧ_{y}ǃ)	(τᴧ_{y})	(δλ_{y})	(τᴧ_{y}ǃ)			
Mid c-sounds	(t_{y})	(d_{y})	(ᴅ_{y})	(t_{y}ʽ)	(t̓ , t_{y}ǃ)	c	j	cǃ	tc	dj	tcǃ	(ɴ_{y})	(n_{y})	(ƚ_{y} , ʟ_{y})	(l_{y})	(ƚ_{y}ǃ)	(tƚ_{y})	(dl_{y})	(tƚ_{y}ǃ)			
Posterior c-sounds	(ṭ_{y})	(ḍ_{y})	(ᴅ̣_{y})	(ṭ_{y}ʽ)	(ṭ̓ , ṭ_{y}ǃ)	c̣	j̣	c̣ǃ	ṭc	ḍj	ṭcǃ	(ɴ̣_{y})	(ṇ_{y})	(ƚ̣_{y} , ʟ̣_{y})	(ḷ_{y})	(ƚ̣_{y}ǃ)	(ṭƚ_{y})	(ḍl_{y})	(ṭƚ_{y}ǃ)			
Anterior palatal	k̯	g̯	ɢ̯	k̯ʽ	k̯̓ , k̯ǃ	x̯	γ̯	x̯ǃ	k̯x	g̯γ	k̯xǃ	ᴎ̯	ŋ̯				k̯ƚ	g̯l	k̯ƚǃ	ᴩ̯	ρ̯	ρ̯ǃ
Mid- palatal	k	g	ɢ	kʽ	k̓ , kǃ	x	γ	xǃ	kx	gγ	kxǃ	ᴎ	ŋ				kƚ	gl	kƚǃ	ᴩ	ρ	ρǃ
Back palatal, velar	ḳ (q)	g̣	ɢ̣	ḳʽ	ḳ̓ , ḳǃ	x̣	γ̣	x̣ǃ	ḳx	g̣γ	ḳxǃ	ᴎ̣	ŋ̣				ḳƚ	g̣l	ḳƚǃ	ᴩ̣	ρ̣	ρ̣ǃ
Glottal	ʼ			ʼ^{ʽ}		ʽ , h	a (any vowel)		ʼ^{ʽ}											(a̓)		
Laryngeal	ʼ̣			ʼ̣^{ʽ}		ḥ	(any vowel with laryngeal resonance)		ʼ̣ḥ													

Notes:

- surd = voiceless; sonant = voiced; intermed. = partially voiced
- In the glottalized stop column, the phonetic symbol appearing on the left side (which is a consonant plus an overhead single quotation mark) represents a weakly glottalized stop (i.e. weakly ejective). The symbol on the right side is strongly glottalized (i.e. it is articulated very forcefully). Example: [k̓ ] = weakly glottalized, [kǃ] = strongly glottalized. (Cf. kʼ = [k] followed by glottal stop.) This convention is only shown for the glottalized stops, but may be used for any of the glottalized consonants.
- "Laryngeal" refers to either pharyngeal or epiglottal.

==== Anthropos (1907) ====
The journal Anthropos published the alphabet to be used in their articles in 1907. It is the same basic system that Sapir and Boas introduced to the United States. Transcription is italic, without other delimiters.

==== Zeitschrift der Deutschen Morgenländischen Gesellschaft (1901) ====
The ZDMG convention for Venda is as follows.

Venda consonants (ZDMG)
		Bilabial	Labio- dental	Dental	Labio- alveolar	Alveolar	Retroflex	Palatal	Velar	Glottal
Obstruent	voiceless	ʼp		ʼt̯			ʼṭ		ʼk	
Obstruent	voiced	b		d̯			ḍ		g	
Continuant	voiceless	f̠	f	s̯	s̮	s	ṣ̌, ṛ	χ́	χ	h
Continuant	voiced	v̠	v	l̯	z̮	z	ẓ̌, ḷ	j	γ	ʼ
Nasal		m		n̯		n	ṇ	ń	ṅ	
Semivowel		w						y		

There is in addition a "velolabial" nasal ṁ.

The voiceless plosives are glottalized. Aspiration is written ph, th, kh etc. Affricates are simple sequences of plosive + fricative. Syllabic nasals are ⟨m̥⟩ etc. The ZDMG chart lists multiple other predictable multigraphs.

Vowels include open ⟨e̠ o̠⟩ and close ⟨ẹ ọ⟩.

=== Variation between authors ===
Following are symbols that differ among well-known Americanist sources.

	Powel 1880	Boas 1911	AAA 1916	Sapir 1934	Sturtevant 1978	WIELD 2020	IPA
plosives
plosives		k·	ky	kʸ	kʸ	k̯, kʸ	c
plosives		g·	gy	gʸ	gʸ	ɡ̯, ɡʸ	ɟ
plosives		q	q, ḳ		q	q	q
plosives		g̣	g̣		ġ	ɡ̇	ɢ
plosives		^{↋}	ʼ	ʔ	ʔ	ʔ	ʔ
affricates
affricates			tθ		θ̂	tθ	t͜θ
affricates			dϑ		ð̂	dð	d͜ð
affricates			ts	c	c	c	t͜s
affricates			dz	ʒ	ʒ	dz	d͜z
affricates	tc		tc	č	č	č	t͜ʃ
affricates	dj		dj	ǯ	ǯ	ǰ	d͡ʒ
affricates		ʟ	tł, tʟ	ƛ	ƛ	ƛ	t͡ɬ
affricates		ʟ̣	dl	λ	λ	λ	d͡ɮ
fricatives
fricatives	ç	ç	θ		θ	θ	θ
fricatives	ȼ	ȼ	ϑ		δ	ð	ð
fricatives	c	c	c		š	š	ʃ
fricatives	j	j	j		ž	ž	ʒ
fricatives	q	x̣	x		x	x	x
fricatives	x	γ	γ		γ	ɣ	ɣ
fricatives		x	x̣		x̣	x̣	χ
fricatives		γ̣	γ̣		γ̇	ɣ̇	ʁ
fricatives					ḥ	ħ	ħ
nasals
nasals	ñ	ñ	ñ	ŋ	ŋ	ŋ	ŋ
nasals		ṇ̃	ṇ̃		ŋ̇	ŋ̇	ɴ
nasals		m̥	ᴍ		M	m̥	m̥
nasals		n̥	ɴ		N	n̥	n̥
nasals		ñ̥	ɴ̃		Ṇ		ŋ̊
laterals		ł	ł, ʟ		ł	ł	ɬ
trills	ɹ		ṛ			ʀ	ʀ

	Powel 1880	Boas 1911	AAA 1916	Sapir 1934	Sturtevant 1978	WIELD 2020	IPA
aspiration	Cʽ	Cʽ	Cʽ, Cʰ		Cʰ	Cʰ	Cʰ
glottalization	Cʼ (bʼ)	C!	Cʼ	Cʼ	C̓	Cʼ	Cʼ, Cˀ
palatalization		C·	Cy, C_{y}	Cʸ	Cʸ	Cʸ	Cʲ
labialization		Cᵘ	Cw, C_{w}	Cʷ	Cʷ	Cʷ	Cʷ
length		V̄?	V̄	V· (V꞉)	V· (V꞉)	V꞉ (a꞉ a꞉꞉ or a· a꞉)	Vː (Vːː)
nasalization	Vⁿ	Vⁿ	V̨		Ṽ	V̨	Ṽ

	Powel 1880	Boas 1911	AAA 1916	Sapir 1934	Sturtevant 1978	WIELD 2020	IPA
vowels
vowels	ǐ	i	i, ī		i	i	i
vowels	i		ɩ, i		ɪ	ɪ	ɪ
vowels	ě	e	e, ē		e	e	e
vowels	e		ɛ, e		ɛ	ɛ	ɛ
vowels	ä		ä, ă		æ	æ	æ
vowels	u	u	u, ū		u	u	u
vowels	ǔ		υ, u		ᴜ	ʊ	ʊ
vowels	o	o	o, ō		o	o	o
vowels	ǒ		ɔ, o		ŏ	ɔ	ɔ
vowels	ɔ	â	ω		ɔ	ɒ	ɒ
vowels			ï		ɨ	ɨ, ï	ɨ, ɯ
vowels	û	ᴇ	ə		ə	ə	ə
vowels			ɑ, ȧ		ʌ	ʌ?	ɐ

== Encoding ==
The IETF language tags register fonnapa as a subtag for text in this notation.

== See also ==
- International Phonetic Alphabet
- English Phonotypic Alphabet
- Uralic Phonetic Alphabet
- Lepsius Standard Alphabet
- Teuthonista

== Bibliography ==
- Abercrombie, David. (1991). "Daniel Jones's teaching". In Abercrombie, David (ed.). Fifty years in phonetics: Selected papers. Edinburgh: Edinburgh University Press. pp. 37–47.(Original work published 1985 in Fromkin, V. A. (ed.). Phonetic linguistics: Essays in honor of Peter Ladefoged. Orlando: Academic Press, Inc.
- Albright, Robert W. (1958). The International Phonetic Alphabet: Its background and development. International journal of American linguistics (Vol. 24, No. 1, Part 3); Indiana University research center in anthropology, folklore, and linguistics, publ. 7. Baltimore. (Doctoral dissertation, Stanford University, 1953).
- American Anthropological Society; Boas, Franz; Goddard, Pliny E.; Sapir, Edward; Kroeber, Alfred L. (1916). Phonetic transcription of Indian languages: Report of committee of American Anthropological Association (Report). Smithsonian miscellaneous collections. Vol. 66. Washington, D.C.: Smithsonian Institution.
- Bloomfield, Leonard; Bolling, George Melville (1927). "What symbols shall we use?". Language. 3 (2): 123–129. doi:10.2307/408965. JSTOR 408965.
- Boas, Franz (August 29, 2013) [1911]. "Introduction by Franz Boas". Handbook of American Indian Languages. Vol. 40. Cambridge University Press. pp. 5–83. ISBN 978-1-108-06342-5.
- Campbell, Lyle (1997). American Indian languages: The historical linguistics of Native America. New York: Oxford University Press. ISBN 0-19-509427-1.
- Clark, John; Yallop, Colin (1995). An introduction to phonetics and phonology (2nd ed.). Oxford: Blackwell. ISBN 0-631-19452-5..
- Goddard (1996). "Introduction". In Goddard, Ives (ed.). Handbook of North American Indians: Languages. Vol. 17. Washington, D. C.: Smithsonian Institution. pp. 1–16. ISBN 0-16-048774-9.
- Herzog, George; Newman, Stanley S.; Sapir, Edward; Swadesh, Mary Haas; Swadesh, Morris; Voegelin, Charles F (1934). "Some orthographic recommendations". American Anthropologist. 36 (4): 629–631. doi:10.1525/aa.1934.36.4.02a00300.
- Hill, Kenneth C. (1988). "Review of Phonetic symbol guide by G. K. Pullum & W. Ladusaw". Language. 64 (1): 143–144. doi:10.2307/414792. JSTOR 414792.
- International Phonetic Association (1949). The principles of the International Phonetic Association, being a description of the International Phonetic Alphabet and the manner of using it, illustrated by texts in 51 languages. London: University College, Department of Phonetics.
- Kemp, J. Alan (1994). "Phonetic transcription: History". In Asher, R. E.; Simpson, J. M. Y. (eds.). The encyclopedia of language and linguistics. Vol. 6. Oxford: Pergamon. pp. 3040–3051.
- Langacker, Ronald W. (1972). Fundamentals of linguistic analysis. New York: Harcourt Brace Jovanovich.
- MacMahon, Michael K. C. (1996). "Phonetic notation". In Daniels, P. T.; Bright, W. (eds.). The world's writing systems. New York: Oxford University Press. pp. 821–846. ISBN 0-19-507993-0.
- Maddieson, Ian (1984). Patterns of sounds. Cambridge studies in speech science and communication. Cambridge: Cambridge University Press.
- Mithun, Marianne (1999). The languages of Native North America. Cambridge: Cambridge University Press. ISBN 0-521-23228-7.
- Odden, David (2005). Introducing phonology. Cambridge University Press. ISBN 0-521-82669-1.
- Pike, Kenneth L. (1943). Phonetics: A critical analysis of phonetic theory and a technic for the practical description of sounds. Ann Arbor: University of Michigan Press.
- Pike, Kenneth L. (1947). Phonemics: A Technique for Reducing Languages to Writing. Ann Arbor: University of Michigan Press.
- Powell, John W. (1880). Introduction to the Study of Indian languages, with words, phrases, and sentences to be collected (2nd ed.). Washington: Government Printing Office.
- Pullum, Geoffrey K.; Laduslaw, William A. (1986). Phonetic symbol guide. Chicago: University of Chicago Press. ISBN 0-226-68532-2.
- Sturtevant, William C., ed. (2022). Introduction. Handbook of North American Indians. Vol. 1. Washington, D. C.: Smithsonian Institution. doi:10.5479/si.21262173. ISBN 978-1-944466-54-1. S2CID 252700488. (part of a 20-volume series published between 1978–present).
