= Elisabeth Engberg-Pedersen =

Danish linguist and professor

Elisabeth Engberg-Pedersen (Danish pronunciation: [e̝ˈlisæpet ˌeŋpɛɐ̯ˈpʰe̝ðɐsn̩]; born 2 July 1952 in Svendborg) is a Danish linguist and professor of applied linguistics at the University of Copenhagen. She has contributed significantly to the description of Danish Sign Language and was the only sign language linguist in Denmark from 1978 to 2004. She is considered an important figure in the development of Danish functional linguistics, and has also studied autism and the relation between language and cognition from a cognitive-functional perspective with focus on semantics and pragmatics. She is the sister of Troels Engberg-Pedersen.

In the media, she has participated in discussions of the use of cochlear implants in deaf children and its effect on the status of Danish Sign Language, arguing that the removal of support for Danish Sign Language and resources associated with it has negative consequences.

== Career ==
Elisabeth Engberg-Pedersen has a cand.mag. degree in linguistics and Danish from 1979 and was employed at the University of Copenhagen from 1983 to 1985 after which she was assistant professor of the psychology of language 1984–1989. In 1989–1992 she was a research consultant at Døves Center for Total Kommunikation (Deaf People's Center for Total Communication). She was then employed at the University of Copenhagen again in 1992–1993 and received the dr.phil. degree ("higher doctorate") for her dissertation Space in Danish Sign Language in 1993, and was then associate professor in linguistics from 1994 to 2009 where she became full professor in applied linguistics.

In 2012, a special issue of the Linguistic Circle of Copenhagen's journal Acta Linguistica Hafniensia was published dedicated to Elisabeth Engberg-Pedersen on the occasion of her 60th birthday. She retired in November 2022.

== Memberships, organizations and prizes ==
Several institutions focused on Danish Sign Language has had boards or representations including her. The Danish Sign Language Council within the Danish Language Council had her as chair from its inception in 2015 until 2021, and she was chair of the committee for the bachelor's degree in sign language interpreting and board member at the Center for Tegnsprog og Tegnstøttet Kommunikation – KC (Center for sign language and sign-supported communication - KC). In 1994, she received the Castberg prize (named after Peter Atke Castberg, one of the first to acknowledge and support Danish Sign Language) for her work on Danish Sign Language. In 2023, she received Einar Hansen's Honorary Award.

She is also included in the Royal Danish Academy of Sciences and Letters (since 2011) and Krak's Blue Book.

As part of her academic work, she is a member of the editorial group of the journal Acta Linguistica Hafniensia and is chair of Martin Levys Mindelegat (Martin Levy's Memorial Grant).

== Grants ==
Elisabeth Engberg-Pedersen has received a number of grants for research projects with her as the principal investigator:

- Language and cognition - perspectives from impairment (LaCPI), 2011-2014 - financed by the Independent Research Fund Denmark.
- Speaker(un)certainty in sign language, 2016-2017 - financed by the Oticon Foundation (now known as the William Demant Foundation).
- Danish Sign Language and SignGram Blueprint, 2018-2019 - financed by Augustinus Fonden, Direktør Alfred Jacobsens Fond (Director Alfred Jacobsen's Foundation) and Schwab Charitable Fund.

== Selected publications ==
- Engberg-Pedersen, Elisabeth (1993). Space in Danish Sign Language: The Semantics and Morphosyntax of the Use of Space in a Visual Language. Hamburg: Signum. ISBN 3-927731-45-5. OCLC 31607877.
- Engberg-Pedersen, Elisabeth; Fortescue, Michael; Harder, Peter; Heltoft, Lars; Falster Jakobsen, Lisbeth, eds. (1996). Content, expression and structure: Studies in Danish functional grammar. Amsterdam/Philadelphia: John Benjamins. ISBN 978-90-272-3032-4. OCLC 34410822.
- Engberg-Pedersen, Elisabeth (1998). Lærebog i tegnsprogs grammatik (in Danish) (2. ed.). Copenhagen: Center for Tegnsprog og Tegnstøttet Kommunikation, KC. ISBN 87-89082-09-5. OCLC 460252617.
- Engberg-Pedersen, Elisabeth; Fortescue, Michael; Harder, Peter; Heltoft, Lars; Herslund, Michael; Falster Jakobsen, Lisbeth (2005). Dansk Funktionel Lingvistik (PDF) (in Danish). University of Copenhagen, Copenhagen Business School & Roskilde University.
- Engberg-Pedersen, Elisabeth (2015). "Perspective in signed discourse: the privileged status of the signer's locus and gaze". Open Linguistics. 1 (1). Walter de Gruyter: 411–431. doi:10.1515/opli-2015-0010. ISSN 2300-9969. S2CID 49270099.
- Engberg-Pedersen, Elisabeth; Boye, Kasper; Harder, Peter (2019). Semantik (in Danish). Frederiksberg: Samfundslitteratur. ISBN 978-87-593-3297-9.
