= Viggo Brøndal =

Danish philologist (1887–1942)

Rasmus Viggo Brøndal (13 October 1887, Copenhagen – 14 December 1942, Copenhagen) was a Danish philologist and professor of Romance languages and literature at Copenhagen University.

He was also a founder of the Linguistic Circle of Copenhagen.

== Background ==
A Danish linguist and language philosopher, Brøndal received a traditional education in philology but showed an early concern for theoretical problems. The Danish philosopher Harald Høffding introduced him to the theory and history of philosophical categories, which was to be the basis of his theory of structural linguistics. This background made him receptive to the ideas of the prestructuralists (such as Antoine Meillet) during his studies in Paris (1912–1913). He read Ferdinand de Saussure's Cours de linguistique générale immediately after its publication as he was proofreading the final version of his sociologically oriented thesis on language history (Substrater og Laan i Romansk og Germansk, 1917). Elements from Saussure were footnoted in his book.

== University professor ==
In 1928, Brøndal was appointed professor of Romance languages at the University of Copenhagen, where he taught until 1942. Louis Hjelmslev and Brøndal soon became the main figures in Danish structural linguistics. Brøndal was in close contact with the Prague Linguistic Circle, especially Roman Jakobson, and was active in establishing the Copenhagen Linguistic Circle in 1931. He founded Acta Linguistica with Hjelmslev in 1939.

The basic problem Brøndal addressed in his linguistics was the relationship between thought and language. He elaborated a universal grammar that united linguistics and logic along the principles of modern structural linguistics. For Brøndal, Saussure's structural linguistics was such an attempt. The grammatical doctrine of Brøndal is outlined in his major work, Ordklasserne (1928), and in "Langage et logique" (1937) and "Linguistique structurale" (1939), both reprinted in Essais de linguistique générale (1943, with Brøndal's annotated bibliography). His universal grammar was supposed to contain all the principles for the deduction of the specific elements of language at different levels and for their relations to nonlinguistic facts, as far as those elements and those relations could express the relation between language and thought. Both the universal and the language‐specific grammars contain four dimensions: morphology, syntax, symbolic, and logic. The two latter dimensions cover the linguistic expression and the linguistic content, respectively.

Although a convinced structural linguist, Brøndal never defended the idea of language as a purely immanent structure. His favorite image of language is of it as a geometry by which we turn the world into meaning and, in doing so, act upon both our own position and the structure of the world. This indissoluble relation between language and reality, subject and object, mind and matter is our reality. To be valid, the theory must answer the question of how human beings relate to the world through a linguistically determined consciousness, not merely describe an immanent formal structure. The core of Brøndal's theory is a reinterpretation of Aristotle's philosophical categories. From this outset, Brøndal proposes a synthesis of classical and modern linguistics in an ambitious attempt at comprehending human reality on the basis of language universals, integrating the concepts of the logic and the linguistic philosophies of Scholasticism, the school of Port‐Royal, G. W. Leibniz, and Wilhelm Humboldt as well as Edmund Husserl's phenomenology and the relational logic of logical positivism.

Brøndal's work on a universal grammar focuses on morphology and merely sketches semantics (Praepositionernes theori, 1940) and syntax (Morfologi og syntax, 1932). He deals only sporadically with phonology and phonetics—that is, the symbolic dimension in his theory. Brøndal was not particularly concerned with the concept of sign. His ultimate purpose was to find the basic features of language that maintained it as an intentional phenomenon in the phenomenological sense used by Franz Brentano and Husserl. He saw the essence of language as object oriented and constitutive of the human relation to the world. But Brøndal's concepts derive from the same philosophical context as the concept of sign and are primarily the Aristotelian categories—substance, quantity, quality, and relation—revised to referred to the four generic categories relatum, descriptum, descriptor, and relator. These categories are the basic elements for the construction of a grammar.

The requirements of structural linguistics helped Brøndal to define the categories in necessary and sufficient interrelationship for morphological and syntactical purposes. But he also developed a set of specific relative categories, especially symmetry, transitivity, and connectivity, from the logical relations of modern logical theory, mainly for semantic purposes. All the categories articulate different ways of relating objects and consciousness. Furthermore, both set of categories are organized according to a series of structural principles derived from the doctrine of language as a structure of differences and similarities.

Like his concept of universal grammar and the concept of intentionality, Brøndal's idea of structural law is influenced by Husserl's Logische Untersuchungen (1900–1901), an influence reinforced by his discussions with Jakobson on Husserl's concept of founding (Fundierung), which establishes the hierarchical relationships between the elements of a totality. Every element of language is integrated in the grammatical structure on a qualitative and a quantitative basis: qualitatively, it is defined by the double dichotomy of morphology versus syntax and symbol versus logic; quantitatively or formally, it is defined by the structural principles for differences and similarities between elements. Thus, the defining notions of Brøndal's doctrine cover that area which in other theories is defined by notions developed in connection with the sign.

In Ordklasserne, Brøndal tries to characterize the specificity of a given totality (the morphology of a language) from the presence and absence of its constituents (the word classes). This analysis is made on the basis of two structural principles: the principle of symmetry, which says that every system of word classes has a tendency to balance manifest contrasts, and the principle of continuity, which says that every system of word classes has a tendency to realize elements of mediation between manifest contrasts. These principles are employed to determine the possible or necessary manifestation or non‐manifestation of word classes in the grammar of a given language in relation to the total inventory of word classes in the morphology of the universal grammar.

Later, Brøndal improved his analysis of structural regularities in generalizing them to include all parts and levels of grammar. When developing the principle of symmetry, Brøndal sets up six forms of relation, which indicate the formal possibilities of the manifestations of a given element: positive, negative, neutral, complex, positive‐complex, and negative‐complex. These forms were applied by, among others, A. J. Greimas (1917–1992) in his structural semantics, following the generalizing intention of Brøndal.

Brøndal also developed the principle of continuity to include the two interdependent concepts of compensation and variation. They are logically inferior to the forms of relation and the categories, and they presuppose the existence of elements already defined qualitatively by the categories and quantitatively by the forms of relation. On this basis, they create a link between the qualitative and the formal characteristics of the grammatical units: if, in a given language, a grammatical element (e.g., a word class) is formally defined as complex, then the internal differentiation of the class will be more restricted than the internal differentiation of an element of less complex definition (positive, negative, or neutral). This is called the principle of compensation. If, in a given language, two elements or groups of elements receive almost the same qualitative or formal definition (e.g., nouns and adjectives, prepositions and prefixes), then the internal differentiation of the two elements or groups of elements will be different. This is called the principle of variation. These two structural regularities are set forth in greatest detail in Praepositionernes theori.

== Sources ==
- Brandt, Per Aage; Kongelige Danske videnskabernes selskab (1989). "Linguistique et sémiotique : actualité de Viggo Brøndal : actes du colloque tenu à la Société royale des sciences, à Copenhague, les 16 et 17 octobre 1987". WorldCat.org (in French).
- Brøndal, Viggo (1943). Essais de linguistique générale (in French). E. Munksgaard. Includes contributions in English and French.
- Larsen, S. E. "A Semiotician in Disguise." In The Semiotic Web 1986. De Gruyter. 31 December 1987. doi:10.1515/9783110861310. ISBN 978-3-11-086131-0.. Contains a complete annotated bibliography of Brøndal's works and a complete bibliography of works on Brøndal.
- Larsen, S. E., ed. "Actualité de Brøndal." Langages 86 (1987).
