= Eli Fischer-Jørgensen =

Danish phonetician (1911–2010)

- Born: 11 February 1911; Nakskov, Denmark
- Died: 27 February 2010 (aged 99); Virum, Denmark
- Education: University of Copenhagen
- Occupations: Linguist; professor

Eli Fischer-Jørgensen (Danish pronunciation: [ˈe̝ːli ˈfiɕɐ ˈjɶɐ̯ˀn̩sn̩]; 11 February 1911, Nakskov, Denmark – 27 February 2010, Virum) was a professor of phonetics at the University of Copenhagen and led the Institute for Phonetics. She was a member of the Danish resistance movement fighting against the German occupation of Denmark.

She began studying French and German at the University of Copenhagen in 1929. She specialized in linguistics and her thesis treated "the importance of dialect geography for the perception of sound changes".

From 1933 she became a member of the Linguistic Circle of Copenhagen which evolved around Louis Hjelmslev and his theory of glossematics. Tired of the theoretical discussions of Hjelmslev's circle, she took up research in the field of phonetics in which she became an international figure, publishing widely used text books about general phonetics and phonological theory. She also corresponded with Roman Jakobson through many years and had met on several occasions.

During the German occupation of Denmark from 1940 to 1945, she worked in the resistance group of Professor Carsten Høeg and under great risk helped him assemble a list of Danish nazis to be prosecuted after the liberation. She was a corresponding member of the Danish Academy of the Sciences and the British Academy.

== Bibliography ==
- Fischer-Jørgensen, Eli. (1975) Trends in phonological theory until 1975, Linguistic Circle of Copenhagen, C.A. Reitzel (distributor)
- Ege, Jens & Eli Fischer-Jørgensen, Interneringskartoteket: Om Carsten Høeg og hans gruppe under besættelsen, Museum Tusculanums Forlag, København (2005)
