= Peter Harder =

Peter Harder may refer to:

- Peter Harder (academic) (born 1950), Danish linguist and professor of English at the University of Copenhagen
- Peter Harder (politician) (born 1952), Canadian senator and former civil servant
