= Langue and parole =

Two terms of Saussure

Langue and parole is a theoretical linguistic dichotomy distinguished by Ferdinand de Saussure in his Course in General Linguistics.

The French term langue ('[an individual] language') encompasses the abstract, systematic rules and conventions of a signifying system; it is independent of, and pre-exists, the individual user. It involves the principles of language, without which no meaningful utterance, or parole, would be possible.

In contrast, parole ('speech') refers to the concrete instances of the use of langue, including texts which provide the ordinary research material for linguistics.

== Background and significance ==
Structural linguistics, as proposed by Saussure, assumes a non-biological standpoint of culture within the nature–nurture divide. Langue and parole make up two thirds of Saussure's speech circuit (French: circuit de la parole); the third part being the brain, where the individual's knowledge of language is located. The speech circuit is a feedback loop between the individual speakers of a given language. It is an interactive phenomenon: knowledge of language arises from language usage, and language usage arises from knowledge of language. Saussure, however, argues that the true locus of language is neither in the verbal behaviour (parole) nor in the mind of the speakers, but is situated in the loop between speech and the individual, existing as such nowhere else but only as a social phenomenon within the speech community.

Consequently, Saussure rejects other contemporary views of language and argues for the autonomy of linguistics. According to Saussure, general linguistics is not:

- the study of human mind, as thought by structural psychologists such as Wilhelm Wundt (and, later, generative and cognitive linguists).
- the study of evolutionary psychology or the biological research of living organisms as claimed by Charles Darwin and the evolutionary linguists (which would later include 'usage-based linguistics' which also argues for a feedback loop between the speakers, but without the emergent langue phenomenon).
- an empirical discipline in the same way that natural sciences are because the true object of study has no physical substance. Saussure however argues that linguistic structures can be scientifically uncovered through text analysis.

Linguistics, then, in Saussure's conception, is properly regarded as the study of semiology, or languages as semiotic (sign) systems.

== Meaning of the terms ==
=== Langue ===
French has two words corresponding to the English word language:

1. langue, which is primarily used to refer to individual languages such as French and English; and
2. langage, which primarily refers to language as a general phenomenon, or to the human ability to have language.

Langue therefore corresponds to the common meaning of language, and the pair langue versus parole is properly expressed in English as 'language versus speech', so long as language is not to be taken in evolutionary terms, but as a description of an (ultimately lifeless) immaterial sign system. The Saussurean term is not, for example, compatible with the concepts of language organ, Universal Grammar, or linguistic competence from the Chomskyan frame of reference. Instead, it is the concept of any language as a semiological system, a social fact, and a system of linguistic norms.

=== Parole ===
Parole, in typical translation, means 'speech'. Saussure, on the other hand, intended for it to mean both the written and spoken language as experienced in everyday life; it is the precise utterances and use of langue. Therefore, parole, unlike langue, is as diverse and varied as the number of people who share a language and the number of utterances and attempts to use that language.

== Relation to formal linguistics ==
From a formal linguistics perspective, Saussure's concept of language and speech can be thought of as corresponding, respectively, to a formal language and the sentences it generates. De Saussure argued before Course in General Linguistics that linguistic expressions might be algebraic.

Building on his insights, Louis Hjelmslev proposed in his 1943 Prolegomena to a Theory of Language a model of linguistic description and analysis based on work of mathematicians David Hilbert and Rudolf Carnap in formal language theory. The structuralist endeavor is, however, more comprehensive, ranging from the mathematical organisation of the semantic system to phonology, morphology, syntax, and the whole discourse or textual arrangement. The algebraic device was considered by Hjelmslev as independent of psychology, sociology and biology. It is consolidated in consequent models of structural–functional linguistics including Systemic Functional Linguistics.

American advocates of the natural paradigm made their own modifications of the model. In 1946, Zellig Harris introduced transformational generative grammar which excluded semantics and placed the direct object into the verb phrase, following Wundt's psychological concept, as advocated in American linguistics by Leonard Bloomfield. Harris's student Noam Chomsky argued for the cognitive essence of linguistic structures, eventually giving the explanation that they were caused by a random genetic mutation in humans.
