= Elizabeth T. Uldall =

American phonetician (1913–2004)

Elizabeth Theodora Uldall (Danish pronunciation: [ˈulˌtɛˀl]; née Anderson; 30 November 1913 – 23 June 2004) was an American linguist and phonetician, who taught at the University of Edinburgh. Born in Kearney, Nebraska, she studied at Barnard College, New York and later went to London to study phonetics with Daniel Jones. Here she met Danish linguist Hans Jørgen Uldall, another student of Jones, and the two married. During World War II the couple worked for the British Council in locations such as Athens, Baghdad, Cairo and Alexandria. She joined the faculty of the University of Edinburgh in 1949. There she produced some of the earliest video recordings of the vibrating vocal folds, using herself as a subject. She also worked on the intonation and rhythm of African languages.
