= Structural linguistics =

View of linguistics

Structural linguistics, or structuralism, in linguistics, denotes schools or theories in which language is conceived as a self-contained, self-regulating semiotic system whose elements are defined by their relationship to other elements within the system. It is derived from the work of Swiss linguist Ferdinand de Saussure and is part of the overall approach of structuralism. Saussure's Course in General Linguistics (French: Cours de linguistique générale, CLG), published posthumously in 1916, stressed examining language as a dynamic system of interconnected units. Saussure is also known for introducing several basic dimensions of semiotic analysis that are still important today. Two of these are his key methods of syntagmatic and paradigmatic analysis (paradigmatic is a later term, Saussure used a wider notion associative), which define units syntactically and lexically, respectively, according to their contrast with the other units in the system.

Structuralism as a term, however, was not used by Saussure, who called the approach semiology. The term structuralism is derived from sociologist Émile Durkheim's anti-Darwinian modification of Herbert Spencer's organic analogy which draws a parallel between social structures and the organs of an organism which have different functions or purposes. Similar analogies and metaphors were used in the historical-comparative linguistics that Saussure was part of. Saussure himself made a modification of August Schleicher's language–species analogy, based on William Dwight Whitney's critical writings, to turn focus to the internal elements of the language organism, or system. Nonetheless, structural linguistics became mainly associated with Saussure's notion of language as a dual interactive system of symbols and concepts. The term structuralism was adopted to linguistics after Saussure's death by the Prague school linguists Nikolai Trubetzkoy and Roman Jakobson, (Note: p. 711: "Were we to comprise the leading idea of present-day science in its most various manifestations, we could hardly find a more appropriate designation than structuralism. Any set of phenomena examined by contemporary science is treated not as a mechanical agglomeration but as a structural whole, and the basic task is to reveal the inner, whether static or developmental, laws of this system.") with the first usage of the terms like "structural principle of the phonological system" going back to the Prague Circle's theses presented at the first International Congress of Linguists in Hague, 1928 and the first International Congress of Slavists in Prague, 1929.

== History ==
Structural linguistics begins with the posthumous publication of Ferdinand de Saussure's Course in General Linguistics in 1916, which his students compiled from his lectures given between 1906 and 1911 (still going through the process of development each year). The book proved to be highly influential, providing the foundation for both modern linguistics and semiotics. Structuralist linguistics is often thought of as giving rise to more or less independent European and American structuralist traditions due to ambiguity in the term and the development of these traditions. Both traditions were influenced by Saussure's ideas; but over time Saussure's influence was weakened in the American school (vide infra).

=== European structuralism ===
In Europe, structural linguistics was represented by: (1) the Geneva School of Albert Sechehaye and Charles Bally, (2) the Prague linguistic circle, (3) the Copenhagen School of Louis Hjelmslev, (4) the Paris School of André Martinet and Algirdas Julien Greimas, (5) Daniel Jones and the separate London School of Linguistics of John Rupert Firth, and (6) the Dutch school of Simon Dik. Structural linguistics also had an influence on other disciplines of humanities bringing about the movement known as structuralism.

=== 'American structuralism', or 'American descriptivism' ===
Some confusion (Note: p. 6: "There was a second misunderstanding. Chomsky's criticism did not address European structuralism. It focused on American structuralism, represented by Leonard Bloomfield and his "distributionist" or Yale School, the dominant form of linguistics in the United States in the fifties. Bloomfield drew his inspiration from behavioral psychology, and considered that it was enough to describe the mechanism of language, to underscore its regularities.") is caused by the fact that an American school of linguistics of 1910s through 1950s is also often nicknamed 'American structuralism'. This American school is alternatively called distributionalism, 'American descriptivism', or the 'Bloomfieldian' school – or 'post-Bloomfieldian', following the death of its leader Leonard Bloomfield in 1949. Another founding figure of this school was Edward Sapir; other notable linguists customarily included in this group are Zellig Harris, George Trager, Bernard Bloch, Martin Joos, Henry Lee Smith Jr., Henry Allan Gleason and Charles Hockett.

The relationship of this school to Saussure and European structuralists was complex and changed over time. There is no indication that Sapir ever read CLG, but Bloomfield considered himself indebted to Saussure. Bloomfield's first book Introduction to the Study of Language was written under the influence of Wilhelm Wundt's psychological ideas, especially those pertaining to the psychology of language. However, from the early 1920s onward Bloomfield abandoned his mentalistic positions, mainly under the behaviorist influence of Albert Paul Weiss, his colleague at the Ohio State University (even though Bloomfield retained some Wundtian ideas, e.g. the idea of constituent structure, later developing into the Immediate constituent analysis in syntax). (Note: p. 2027: "The prime mover, in this respect, was Leonard Bloomfield (1887–1949), who drew his inspiration mainly from the German philosopher-psychologist Wilhelm Wundt ... Wundt proposed that both psychological and linguistic structures should be analyzed according to the principle of hierarchical constituency, corresponding to the modern notion of tree structure or immediate constituent analysis (IC-analysis) ... In the early 1920s Bloomfield turned away from Wundtian psychology and embraced the then brand new ideology of behaviorism. Yet the Wundtian notion of constituent structure remained and even became more and more central to Bloomfield's thinking about language. It is the central notion in the theory of grammar presented in the chapters 10 to 16 of his (1933).") No longer being able to ground language in psychology, Bloomfield found rescue in Saussure, from whom Bloomfield "acquires his dictum that linguistics does not need psychology". Bloomfield praised Saussure's distinction between "synchronic" and "diachronic" linguistics; separation of linguistics from physiology and psychology; the trichotomy of le langage (human speech) – la langue (the language) – la parole (speech-utterance); and the view of language as an "arbitrary system of social habit". While Bloomfield did not adopt the Saussurean terminology of signifiant and signifié and considered "the statement of meanings the weak point in language study", he essentially agreed with Saussure on the importance of the joint consideration of form and meaning, calling it "the fundamental assumption of linguistics, namely: In certain communities (speech-communities) some speech-utterances are alike as to form and meaning", with the language system arising from the relational consideration of differences between utterances (especially in phonology).

At the same time, notwithstanding this influence, Saussure is mentioned just once in Bloomfield's influential book Language, (Note: p. 371: "The relationship with Bloomfield is more complex. Bloomfield, reviewing Sapir, defines the CLG as "a theoretical foundation to the newer trend of linguistic study" (Bloomfield 1922), a judgment repeated two years later in his own review of the CLG (Bloomfield 1924). Two years later, Bloomfield emphasized his “ideal debt” to Sapir and Saussure (Bloomfield 1926, p. 153), but a few years after that, in Language, Saussure’s name appears only once (p. 19), in the history of linguistic doctrines. Bloomfield had the opportunity to acknowledge his debt to Saussure privately. A valuable testimony in this regard is provided by Roman Jakobson (private letter of March 4, 1968): “In a conversation with me, Bloomfield mentioned, among the four of five works which had the greatest influence on him, just Saussure’s Cours.” But the isolated mention of Saussure’s name in Language allows us to maintain that this marks the beginning of Saussure’s eclipse, characteristic of post-Bloomfieldian linguistics." (Les rapports avec Bloomfield sont plus com-plexes. Celui-ci, rendant compte de Sapir, définit le C. L. G. comme "a theoretic foundation to the newer trend of linguistic study" (Bloomfield 1922), jugement repris deux ans plus tard dans le compte rendu du C. L. G. lui-même (Bloomfield 1924). Encore deux années plus tard, Bloomfield souligne sa «dette idéale» envers Sapir et Saus-sure (Bloomfield 1926.153), mais quelques années après, dans Lan-guage, le nom de Saussure n'apparaît qu'une seule fois (p. 19), dans l'histoire des doctrines linguistiques. Bloomfield a eu l'occasion de reconnaître en privé sa dette envers Saussure. Un précieux témoi-gnage en ce sens est fourni par Roman Jakobson (lettre privée du 4-3-1968): « In a conversation with me, Bloomfield mentioned, among the four of five works which had the greatest influence on him, just Saussure's Cours. » Mais la mention isolée du nom de Saussure dans Language autorise à maintenir que commence là l'éclipse de Saussure, caractéristique de la linguistique post-bloomfieldienne.)) and the later generation of American structuralists almost never referred to Saussure and often didn't even read him. (Note: p. 10: "The late Charles Hockett, regarded by many as Bloomfield’s intellectual heir, confided to me in private conversation at an LSA meeting in 1991 that he had read the Cours only in the early 1980s. <...> The other date, too, can be documented, thanks to Julia Falk, who had corresponded with Hockett during the last years of his life. For instance, in his letter to her of 15 January 1994, Hockett wrote: “In fact, I didn’t read the Cours until after I retired from Cornell, in 1982, in the de Mauro French edition (my copy bears the date 1980 on the title page)”.") Zellig Harris took distributionalist ideas even further, claiming that "the structures of language can be described only in terms of the formal, not the semantic, differences of its units and their relations", operationalizing the meaning consideration into the techniques like 'paired utterance test' for distinguishing phonemic contrasts where reference to meaning was unavoidable.

The strongest link between American and European structuralists was phonology (most commonly called phonemics in America at the time). In his impactful 1925 paper "Sound Patterns in Language" Edward Sapir independently arrived at the modern conception of phonemes not as speech sounds but as abstract elements defined by their place in a language system, i.e. language's sound pattern (though he did not use the term "phoneme" in this sense at the moment, adopting it only later in the 1933 paper). Vilém Mathesius, the founder of the Prague Circle, wrote approvingly of the paper in 1926 and in other articles, as did Josef Vachek. (Note: p. 378: Here [Mathesius] says: "The modern development of phonological research introduces psychological value to the description of pronuncia tion." He then proceeds to cite Sapir's (1925) "theory about the special grouping of sounds which is individual for each language and which depends not on their phonetic similarity, but on their function in a given language.") Trubetzkoy and Sapir held each other in high regard and maintained a lively written correspondence; (Note: p. 162: The Prague Circle had very close ties with Edward Sapir. When we held the International Phonological Conference of 1930, Sapir, though unable to attend, kept up a lively correspondence with Trubetzkoy about this Prague assembly and the development of the inquiry into linguistic, especially phonological, structure. Almost nothing remains of this exchange. Those of Sapir's messages which had not been seized by the Gestapo were lost when the Viennese home of Trubetzkoy's widow was demolished by an air raid. In their turn, Trubetzkoy's letters perished when Sapir, at the end of his life, destroyed his entire epistolary archive. However, some quotations from Sapir's letters have survived in Trubetzkoy's correspondence, and others were cited by Trubetzkoy at our meetings. It is noteworthy that Sapir underscored the similarity of his and our approaches to the basic phonological problems.) the same can be said of Trubetzkoy's relationship with Bloomfield, with whom he studied together in Leipzig in 1913. (Note: p. 162: Trubetzkoy had a very high opinion of the American linguist whom he called 'my Leipzig comrade'. This was Leonard Bloomfield, who in 1913 shared a bench with Trubetzkoy and Lucien Tesniere at Leskien's and Brugmann's lectures. Bloomfield (Hockett 1970:247) praised 'Trubetzkoy's excellent article on vowel systems' of 1929 and devoted his sagacious 1939 study on 'Menomini Morphophonemics' (Hockett 1970:351-62) to N. S. Trubetzkoy's memory.)

The following generation of American structuralists were more skeptical of the work that was being done in Europe. The Americans' positivistic, empiricist and behaviorist outlook and the orientation on the fieldwork with the indigenous languages of the Americas lead to the reciprocal disdain between the Americans and Europeans. Many American linguists often believed European theories to by mystical (Note: p. 53:"As Henry A. Gleason recalled: ‘The popular wisdom [among Americans] was that some European linguists sat in their offices and dreamed up theory, often totally detached from reality of any kind’ (Gleason 1988: 6)") and lacking in terminological rigour. (Note: p. 345: "The Prague Circle terminology, however, has two dangers: First, it gives the impression that there are two objects of possible investigation, the Sprechakt (speech) and the Sprachgebilde (language structure), whereas the latter is merely the scientific arrangement of the former.") At the same time Europeans critiqued Americans of the neglect of the questions of meaning and functionality. (Note: p. 80: "Some American linguists on the other hand have gone much further and indulged in speculations that are divorced from reality. The analytic method of Z. S. Harris for example is a logico-mathematical construction lacking firm foundation. He deliberately restricted his research to questions of distribution, [...] thereby eliminating the meaning of words from his analysis, as B. Bloch and G. Trager had done before him. One wonders what happens, with this purely mechanical procedure, when the criterion of distribution is considered to be the only relevant one, to the expressive, stylistic, and other variants that are of prime importance in communication amongst human beings.") Nevertheless, the most basic tenets of both Europeans and Americans remained the same. (Note: p. 575: "It is interesting to note that, in spite of profound theoretical divergences, there is a considerable amount of practical agreement among structuralists") (Note: p. 146: "It does not follow, once more, that the American structuralists were not ‘structuralist’. For what was common to all schools was the principle, in Robins’s words, that units are ‘defined relatively to each other, not absolutely’. Phonemes, for example, were identified in opposition to other phonemes. In Bloomfieldian terms, their realisations were in ‘contrastive’ not in ‘complementary distribution’ (3.2). Morphemes likewise were to be identified in opposition to other morphemes. We do not approach a language with a check-list of ‘sounds’, like [l] or [d] or [t], that we expect to find as phonemes in it. Nor do we approach it with a check-list of conceptual categories, such as ‘past time’ or ‘plurality’ or ‘the person speaking’, on which we try to map grammatical units. In phonology, no competent investigator would describe a language otherwise. That in itself has been one of the triumphs of structuralism.") The separation of synchronic and diachronic linguistics; the distinction between parole (speech-act) and langue (linguistic system); the relational, structural and autonomous nature of such systems. (Note: p. 201: "Thirdly, de Saussure showed that any langue must be envisaged and described synchronically as a system of interrelated elements, lexical, grammatical, and phonological, and not as an aggregate of self-sufficient entities (which he compared to a mere nomenclature). Linguistic terms are to be defined relatively to each other, not absolutely. This is the theory expressed in his statement that a langue is forme, non substance, and illustrated with his well-known metaphors of chessmen and trains, identified and known by their place in the whole system, of the game or the railway network, and not by their actual-substantial composition. In a language these interrelations lie on each of the two fundamental dimensions of synchronic linguistic structure, syntagmatic, in line with the succession of utterance, and paradigmatic (associative), in systems of contrastive elements or categories. This statement of the structural approach to language underlies virtually the whole of modern linguistics, and justifies de Saussure's claim on the independence of linguistics as a subject of study in its own right.") It can be said that American structuralists often viewed these tenets in the methodological and operationalistic light, rather that the theoretical and philosophical European point of view, even if the difference was one of degree rather than absolute. (Note: p. 433: "One of the salient features of the descriptivist model is the degree to which it came to concern itself with representations, and with the procedures or devices that define those representations. The shift in focus from the study of the properties of languages to the study of the properties of the devices used to describe and analyse languages is one of the most enduring influences of the descriptivists")

In the generative or Chomskyan conception, a purported rejection of 'structuralism' usually refers to Noam Chomsky's opposition to the anti-mentalism of the post-Bloomfieldians; Chomsky's critique of Saussure consisted of (1) the view of language as a mere store of signs; (Note: p. 23: "Saussure, like Whitney (and possibly under his influence - cf. Godel, 1957, 32-3), regards langue as basically a store of signs with their grammatical properties, that is, a store of word-like elements, fixed phrases and, perhaps, certain limited phrase types (though it is possible that his rather obscure concept of "mecanisme de la langue" was intended to go beyond this - cf. Godel, 1957,250).") (2) placing the sentence and syntax mostly in the domain of parole; (Note: p. 23: "[Saussure] appears to regard sentence formation as a matter of parole rather than langue, of free and voluntary creation rather than systematic rule (or perhaps, in some obscure way, as on the border between langue and parole)") (3) focus on the social nature of langue instead of the individual's competence/I-language. (Note: p. 16: "Modern linguistics commonly avoided these questions by considering an idealized 'speech community' that is internally consistent in its linguistic practice [...]. No attempt is made to capture or formulate any concept with the sociopolitical or normative-teleological aspects of informal usage of the term 'language'. The same is true of approaches that understand language to be a social product in accordance with the Saussurean concept of 'langue'.") Most notably, Chomsky's early transformational-generative grammar broke the Saussurean unity of the linguistic sign because the semantic module is said to interact with deep structure instead of surface structure (Note: p. 95: "But semantic representations were not just the ‘signifiés’ of individual signs. They were the meanings, as determined by a generative grammar, of whole sentences. Nor were parts of meanings related one to one to parts of signals. Phonetic representations were paired first with surface structures; and this relation was already not as simple as sign theories had at first implied. Surface structures were in turn paired with deep structures; and the ‘arrangements’ of morphemes on these levels, to borrow again Hockett’s terminology, could be as different, both in the units themselves and in their order, as need be. Finally deep structures were paired with semantic representations; and, when the ‘veils of obscurity’ were lifted, that relation might be as complex. For any sentence, the relation between the ‘signal’ and its ‘meaning’, via the mediating level of syntax, could in principle be very indirect. Such schemes were therefore apt to be rejected by any structuralist for whom the Saussurean link between the two sides of the sign remained central. By the same token, of course, anyone who took that view would, from a Chomskyan viewpoint, be concerned with syntax only at a surface level.") and because of the introduction of the notion of empty category (Note: p. 139: "I conclude here by pointing out that the introduction of the transformation entails a still more radical claim to autonomy than I have considered so far. In the transformational frameworks current over the last quarter of a century the presence of transformations is accompanied by the positing of ‘empty categories’. These are categories that are not associated with a sign: they belong to units of content form that do not enter into a ‘sound-meaning correlation’; there is no correlated unit of sound. They involve recognition of a new unit of form, one that is not correlated with form in the other plane. They thus weaken the role of the sign in regulating the establishment of units: there are units of content that are uncorrelated.") In the light of more recent lexicalist developments of the Chomskyan theory this discrepancy narrows. (Note: p. 153-154: "One of the principal developments in generative grammar since the 1960s has been the placing of severe restrictions on transformations (reduced in later versions of his theory to only one — Move or Affect — with a whole module of GB, called bounding theory, devoted to limitations on its application) and consequently a de-emphasis on the contrast between deep and surface structure <...> Since the early 1970s it has gone steadily in a 'lexicalist' direction, to the point that what was 'minimal' in his 1990s Minimalist Program was grammar, syntax. Nearly all the work that innate Universal Grammar used to do is now accomplished by morphological features that are already part of words as they are stored in the lexicon. <...> if [Alec] Marantz is right and 'Syntax reduces to a simple description of how constituents drawn from the lexicon can be combined and how movement is possible', we have come back to something uncomfortably close to what Chomsky in 1962 described as the position of Saussure, who 'regards langue as basically a store of signs with their grammatical properties'.")

== Basic theories and methods ==
The foundation of structural linguistics is a sign, which in turn has two components: a "signified" is an idea or concept, while the "signifier" is a means of expressing the signified. The "sign", e.g. a word, is thus the combined association of signifier and signified. The value of a sign can be defined only by being placed in contrast with other signs. This forms the basis of what later became the paradigmatic dimension of semiotic organization (i.e., terms and inventories of terms that stand in opposition to each other). This is contrasted drastically with the idea that linguistic structures can be examined in isolation from meaning, or that the organisation of the conceptual system can exist without a corresponding organisation of the signifying system.

Paradigmatic relations hold among sets of units, such as the set distinguished phonologically by variation in their initial sound cat, bat, hat, mat, fat, or the morphologically distinguished set ran, run, running. The units of a set must have something in common with one another, but they must contrast too, otherwise they could not be distinguished from each other and would collapse into a single unit, which could not constitute a set on its own, since a set always consists of more than one unit. Syntagmatic relations, in contrast, are concerned with how units, once selected from their paradigmatic sets of oppositions, are 'chained' together into structural wholes.

Syntagmatic and paradigmatic relations provide the structural linguist with a tool for categorization for phonology, morphology and syntax. Take morphology, for example. The signs cat and cats are associated in the mind, producing an abstract paradigm of the word forms of cat. Comparing this with other paradigms of word forms, we can note that, in English, the plural often consists of little more than adding an -s to the end of the word. Likewise, through paradigmatic and syntagmatic analysis, we can discover the syntax of sentences. For instance, contrasting the syntagma je dois ("I should") and dois-je? ("Should I?") allows us to realize that in French we only have to invert the units to turn a statement into a question. We thus take syntagmatic evidence (difference in structural configurations) as indicators of paradigmatic relations (e.g., in the present case: questions vs. assertions).

The most detailed account of the relationship between a paradigmatic organisation of language as a motivator and classifier for syntagmatic configurations was provided by Louis Hjelmslev in his Prolegomena to a Theory of Language, giving rise to formal linguistics. Hjelmslev's model was subsequently incorporated into systemic functional grammar, functional discourse grammar, and Danish functional grammar.

== Structural explanation ==
In structuralism, elements of a language are explained in relation to each other. For example, to understand the function of one grammatical case, it must be contrasted to all the other cases and, more widely, to all other grammatical categories of the language.

The structural approach in humanities follows from 19th century Geist thinking which is derived from Georg Wilhelm Friedrich Hegel's philosophy. According to such theories, society or language arises as the collective psyche of a community; and this psyche is sometimes described as an 'organism'. In sociology, Émile Durkheim made a humanistic modification of Herbert Spencer's organic analogy. Durkheim, following Spencer's theory, compared society to an organism which has structures (organs) that carry out different functions. For Durkheim a structural explanation of society is that the population growth, through an organic solidarity (unlike Spencer who believes it happens by a self-interested conduct) leads to an increase of complexity and diversity in a community, creating a society. The structuralist reference became essential when linguistic 'structuralism' was established by the Prague linguistic circle after Saussure's death, following a shift from structural to functional explanation in the social anthropology of Alfred Radcliffe-Brown and Bronisław Malinowski.

Saussure himself had actually used a modification of August Schleicher's Darwinian organic analogy in linguistics; his concept of la langue is the social organism or spirit. It needs to be noted that, despite certain similarities, structuralism and functionalism in humanistic linguistics are explicitly anti-Darwinian. This means that linguistic structures are not explained in terms of selection through competition; and that the biological metaphor is not to be taken literally. What is more, Saussure abandoned evolutionary linguistics altogether and, instead, defined synchronic analysis as the study of the language system; and diachronic analysis as the study of language change. With such precaution, structural explanation of language is analogous to structuralism in biology which explains structures in relation with material factors or substance. In Saussure's explanation, structure follows from systemic consequences of the association of meaning and expression. This can be contrasted with functional explanation which explains linguistic structure in relation to the "adaptation" of language to the community's communicative needs.

Hjelmslev's elaboration of Saussure's structural explanation is that language arises from the structuring of content and expression. He argues that the nature of language could only be understood via the typological study of linguistic structures. In Hjelmslev's interpretation, there are no physical, psychological or other a priori principles that explain why languages are the way they are. Cross-linguistic similarities on the expression plane depend on a necessity to express meaning; conversely, cross-linguistic similarities on the content plane depend on the necessity to structure meaning potential according to the necessities of expression.

"The linguist must be equally interested in the similarity and in the difference between languages, two complementary sides of the same thing. The similarity between languages is their very structural principle; the difference between languages is the carrying out of that principle in concreto. Both the similarity and the difference between languages lie, then, in language and in languages themselves, in their internal structure; and no similarity or difference between languages rests on any factor outside language." – Louis Hjelmslev

=== Compositional and combinatorial language ===
According to André Martinet's concept of double articulation, language is a double-levelled or doubly articulated system. In this context, 'articulation' means 'joining'. The first level of articulation involves minimally meaningful units (monemes: words or morphemes), while the second level consists of minimally distinct non-signifying units (phonemes). Owing to double articulation, it is possible to construct all necessary words of a language with a couple dozen phonic units. Meaning is associated with combinations of the non-meaningful units. The organisation of language into hierarchical inventories makes highly complex and therefore highly useful language possible:

"We might imagine a system of communication in which a special cry would correspond to each given situations and these facts of experience, it will be clear that if such a system were to serve the same purpose as our languages, it would have to comprise so large a number of distinct signs that the memory of man would be incapable of storing it. A few thousand of such units as tête, mal, ai, la, freely combinable, enable us to communicate more things than could be done by millions of unarticulated cries." – André Martinet

Louis Hjelmslev's conception includes even more levels: phoneme, morpheme, lexeme, phrase, sentence and discourse. Building on the smallest meaningful and non-meaningful elements, glossemes, it is possible to generate an infinite number of productions:

"When we compare the inventories yielded at the various stages of the deduction, their size will usually turn out to decrease as the procedure goes on. If the text is unrestricted, i.e., capable of being prolonged through constant addition of further parts … it will be possible to register an unrestricted number of sentences." – Louis Hjelmslev

These notions are a continuation in a humanistic tradition which considers language as a human invention. A similar idea is found in Port-Royal Grammar:

"It remains for us to examine the spiritual element of speech ... this marvelous invention of composing from twenty-five or thirty sounds an infinite variety of words, which, although not having any resemblance in themselves to that which passes through our minds, nevertheless do not fail to reveal to others all of the secrets of the mind, and to make intelligible to others who cannot penetrate into the mind all that we conceive and all of the diverse movements of our souls." – Antoine Arnauld

=== Interaction of meaning and form ===
Another way to approach structural explanation is from Saussure's concept of semiology (semiotics). Language is considered as arising from the interaction of form and meaning. Saussure's concept of the bilateral sign (signifier – signified) entails that the conceptual system is distinct from physical reality. For example, the spoken sign 'cat' is an association between the combination of the sounds [k], [æ] and [t] and the concept of a cat, rather than with its referent (an actual cat). Each item in the conceptual inventory is associated with an expression; and these two levels define, organise and restrict each other.

Key concepts of the organisation of the phonemic versus the semantic system are those of opposition and distinctiveness. Each phoneme is distinct from other phonemes of the phonological system of a given language. The concepts of distinctiveness and markedness were successfully used by the Prague Linguistic Circle to explain the phonemic organisation of languages, laying a ground for modern phonology as the study of the sound systems of languages, also borrowing from Wilhelm von Humboldt.

Likewise, each concept is distinct from all others in the conceptual system, and is defined in opposition with other concepts. Louis Hjelmslev laid the foundation of structural semantics with his idea that the content-level of language has a structure analogous to the level of expression. Structural explanation in the sense of how language shapes our understanding of the world has been widely used by the post-structuralists.

Structural linguist Lucien Tesnière, who invented dependency grammar, considered the relationship between meaning and form as conflicting due to a mathematical difference in how syntactic and semantic structure is organised. He used his concept of antinomy between syntax and semantics to elucidate the concept of a language as a solution to the communication problem. From his perspective, the two-dimensional semantic dependency structure is necessarily forced into one-dimensional (linear) form. This causes the meaningful semantic arrangement to break into a largely arbitrary word ordering.

== Scientific validity ==
Saussure's model of language emergence, the speech circuit, entails that la langue (language itself) is external to the brain and is received via la parole (language usage). While Saussure mostly employed interactive models, the speech circuit suggests that the brain is shaped by language, but language is not shaped by the brain except to the extent that the interactive association of meaning and form occurs ultimately in the brain.

Such ideas roughly correspond to the idea of language that arises from neuroimaging studies. Event-related Potential (ERP) studies have found that language processing is based on the interaction of syntax and semantics rather than on innate grammatical structures. Magnetic Resonance Imaging (MRI) studies have found that the child's brain is shaped differently depending on the structural characteristics of their first language. By contrast, research evidence has failed to support the inverse idea that syntactic structures reflect the way the brain naturally prefers to process syntactic structures. It is argued that Functional Grammar, deriving from Saussure, is compatible with the view of language that arises from brain research and from the cross-linguistic study of linguistic structures.

== Recent perceptions of structuralism ==
Those working in the generativist tradition often regard structuralist approaches as outdated and superseded. For example, Mitchell Marcus writes that structural linguistics was "fundamentally inadequate to process the full range of natural language". Holland writes that Chomsky had "decisively refuted Saussure". Similar views have been expressed by Jan Koster, Mark Turner, and other advocates of sociobiology.

Others however stress the continuing importance of Saussure's thought and structuralist approaches. Gilbert Lazard has dismissed the Chomskyan approach as passé while applauding a return to Saussurean structuralism as the only course by which linguistics can become more scientific. Matthews notes the existence of many "linguists who are structuralists by many of the definitions that have been proposed, but who would themselves vigorously deny that they are anything of the kind", suggesting a persistence of the structuralist paradigm.

== Effect of structuralist linguistics upon other disciplines ==
In the 1950s Saussure's ideas were appropriated by several prominent figures in continental philosophy, anthropology, and from there were borrowed in literary theory, where they are used to interpret novels and other texts. However, several critics have charged that Saussure's ideas have been misunderstood or deliberately distorted by continental philosophers and literary theorists and are certainly not directly applicable to the textual level, which Saussure himself would have firmly placed within parole and so not amenable to his theoretical constructs.

== Modern guidebooks of structural (formal and functional) analysis ==
- Roland Schäfer, 2018. Einführung in die grammatische Beschreibung des Deutschen (3rd ed.). Berlin: Language Science Press. ISBN 978-3-96110-116-0 (digital), ISBN 978-3-96110-117-7 (hard), ISBN 978-3-96110-118-4 (soft), ISBN 978-1727793741 (soft).
- Emma Pavey, 2010. The Structure of Language: An Introduction to Grammatical Analysis. Cambridge University Press. ISBN 9780511777929
- Kees Hengeveld & Lachlan MacKenzie, 2008. Functional Discourse Grammar: A Typologically-Based Theory of Language Structure. Oxford University Press. ISBN 9780199278107
- M.A.K. Halliday, 2004. An Introduction to Functional Grammar. 3rd edition, revised by Christian Matthiessen. London: Hodder Arnold.ISBN 978 0 340 76167 0

== See also ==
- Theory of language
- Structuralism in Literature by Robert Scholes
