= Troels Engberg-Pedersen =

Professor of New Testament exegesis at the University of Copenhagen

Troels Engberg Pedersen
- Education: University of Copenhagen; University of Oxford
- Years active: 20th and 21st century
- Theological work
- Tradition or movement: Pauline, Stoic philosophy
- Main interests: Pauline epistles, Stoicism, early Christianity, Hellenistic social structures

Troels Engberg Pedersen is a Pauline theologian, author, and professor of New Testament exegesis at the University of Copenhagen in Denmark.

== Education ==
Dr. Engberg-Pedersen completed his Undergraduate studies in Classics at University of Copenhagen, then went on to study ancient and modern philosophy at University of Oxford from 1974–76, where he was promoted Doctorate of Philosophy. His doctoral thesis, entitled "Aristotle's Theory of Moral Insight,” (1983), was published through Oxford University Press. Engberg-Pedersen's was also promoted Doctorate of Theology. His doctoral studies mark the beginning of his exploration into the influence of Stoicism, on early Christianity, particularly as it relates to the scriptural letters of St.Paul the Apostle.

== Career ==
For approximately 25 years, Pedersen has focused his attentions on the writings of Paul the Apostle and on exploring how the structure and content of the Pauline epistles align with themes which are present in Stoic philosophy of the Hellenistic Period. When set in conjunction with Paul's identity as a Greco-Roman Jew, the implications of Paul's letters standout as a demonstration of how the early Christian church community developed in light of the Greco-Roman world which surrounded it.

== Paul, Hellenistic Social Relationship and early Christianity ==
Within the Hellenistic Period, the social structure was primarily hierarchical in the Roman Empire. Roman aristocrats were situated at the top of a social pyramid while slaves were the lowest of all society. Unless a generous patron could intercede and assist in facilitating limited mobility of his or her client, the hierarchy stood strong; within smaller groups in Hellenistic culture, such as a family scenario and guilds, this kind of structure was established, as well. As it was laid out in Greek classical thought, there was opportunity for members of society to enter into friendships, based on equality of status, which was typically only achieved by members of the aristocracy, where each party shares all things in common. How one interacted with superiors, equals, and inferiors determined a person's status within this social system. Engberg-Pedersen draws from this background of social relationship within the Roman Empire during the Hellenistic period in order to show Paul's approach to early Christianity:evidence of friendship motifs were very present within the letter-writing practices of that period and can be seen very plainly, particularly in Paul's letters to the Philippians.

Within Paul's own understanding of hierarchy between Heaven and Earth, he sees God as being situated within the highest place, with Christ right below. Only just underneath Christ's ranking, Paul sees himself, followed by his co-workers, and finally includes those in the faith communities and those outside of the Christian circle. Engberg-Pedersen introduces this concept as being a “notion of subordination…”. While emphasizing a tenor of friendship within his letters, it should also be recognized that there is an authority within the messages, due to Paul's protectiveness over of his apostleship, based on his concept of hierarchy that he has in place for himself, he also has to maneuver his theological principles in response to the influences of the hierarchy at work in the sociopolitical system he sees around him. Political celebrations and expectations from the Empire, inclusive of those in the early Christian communities Paul founded, proved to be problematic for the members and followers. Maintaining a Christian lifestyle while navigating the sociopolitical factors was the cause of quite a bit of detailed instruction from Paul in some of his letters. Within his written responses and advisement to individual Christian communities, Engberg-Pedersen makes claims that Paul draws from common understandings of societal practices of his time, yet strives to make them applicable to new context for his followers.

Engberg-Pedersen draws from the scholarship done by John T. Fitzgerald when discussing how Paul uses the social practice of forgiveness and atonement to illustrate Christian practices. Fitzgerald, in Paul and Paradigm Shifts: Reconciliation and Its Linkage Group discusses that in the Greco-Roman world, it was left to a guilty person to appeal to the goodwill of the person that he or she offended, with the hope that the offended person would choose to forgive the wrong. This understanding of forgiveness was fairly dichotomized between how one forgives within a public, social structure and how a person approached a more religious form of atonement. The perspective of Paul and his advice to quarreling communities take on a deeper implication for relationship within members of the church in seeing him interweave these two concepts into one; through his use of the rhetoric of the time, counterbalanced by his own experience of mercy from God in his own conversion, Paul takes the societal attitude toward reconciliation and makes it into a spiritual consideration of forgiveness: God is the initiator of the forgiveness, even when we are sinful. Even though we may offend God, He offers an appeal to reconcile us to himself. This paradigm shift is particularly present within Paul's second letter to the Corinthians (see [2 Corinthians 5:20-21] ), where Paul implores the Christian community to make reparations in their relationships with each other through illustrating Christ's death on the cross. Troels Engberg-Pedersen complements Fitzgerald's discussion of Christian forgiveness as a means of illustrating how Paul's writings emphasize the link between relationship with God and human agency.

Within his text, Cosmology and the Self in the Apostle Paul, Troel Engberg-Pedersen illustrates this link between human and divine through a concept that he creates, consisting of an “I”-“X”-“S”, where “I” designates the individual self, “X” is Christ and “S” is the social/shared pole In this figure, he shows that in the letters of Paul, the apostle describes a way of self-understanding in which the individual intentionally directs everything he or she toward God and Christ (e.g. Gal 2:20,

I have been crucified with Christ; and it is no longer I who live, but Christ lives in me; and the life which I now live in the flesh I live by faith in the Son of God, who loved me and gave Himself up for me.

Pedersen shows that this directed-ness toward God and Christ manifests itself in becoming other-centered through this relationship. Through individual awareness and a recognition of connection with Father and Son, resulting in the building up the broader community, it is easy to see that this interaction between the human and divine illustrates the foundational tenets upon which the modern structure of church had been established. Throughout the letters, even though it is not with any frequency, Paul is shown to draw upon his own self-awareness and experience of Christ in order to demonstrate how Christians should humble themselves before God in order to serve others through their commitment to Christ. For instance, Paul uses himself as an example of in his Letter to the Philippians:

although I myself have grounds for confidence in the flesh. If anyone else thinks he can be confident in the flesh, all the more can I. Circumcised on the eighth day, of the race of Israel, of the tribe of Benjamin, a Hebrew of Hebrew parentage, in observance of the law a Pharisee, in zeal I persecuted the church, in righteousness based on the law, I was blameless. [But] whatever gains I had, these I come to consider a loss because of Christ. More than that, I even consider everything a loss because of the supreme good of knowing Christ Jesus my Lord. For his sake I have accepted the loss of all things and I consider them so much rubbish that I may gain Christ and be found in him, not having any righteousness of my own based on the law but that which comes through faith in Christ, the righteousness from God, depending on the faith to know him and the power of his resurrection and the sharing of his sufferings by being conformed to his death, if somehow I may attain the resurrection from the dead(Phil 3:4-11)

== Influence of Stoicism on Paul's Letters ==
Within the Stoic tradition, Engberg-Pedersen describes an ideal of society conceived by founder Zeno, which prescribes a political system established on the tenets of homonoia, philia and Eleutheria, rather than a broken down educational system which causes hostility and division. Chrysippus, Stoicism's second founder, believed the ideal society to be that which was made up of people who were morally good, but also had a healthy citizenship through governance.

In his limited rhetorical training, this understanding of moral citizenship as described in Stoicism influences Paul's writings, and reflect a spirit of what Engberg-Pedersen describes as koinonia, or a sense of communion amongst members of the same society. Within this communion as a family of faith, can each member be held accountable for upholding belief and virtue in Christ, and not succumbing to vice (Phil 4:8-9 ). It is the very same spirit of communion that he describes in his letter to Philippians which drives Paul to view the corporal Christian church as superseding the faith of the individual person. It is this philosophical starting point that guides Paul's emphasis on “citizenship of Heaven” that he alludes to in Philippians 3:15-20, which says "Let us, then, who are ‘perfectly mature’ adopt this attitude. And if you have a different attitude, this too God will reveal to you. Only, with regard to what we have attained, continue on the same course...but our citizenship is in heaven and from it we also await a savior, the Lord Jesus Christ.”

== God and Human Agency--An Integration of Stoicism and early Christianity ==
Engberg-Pedersen illustrates this “I”-“X”-“S” relationship between the human person, the divine and the human family, in the same spirit that Paul strives to help his communities in re-assessing their status as Christians in reference to where they situate themselves within the larger Hellenistic society. Within Greek philosophy, a movement that Paul describes toward achieving full potential and personhood is referred to as the telos. However, in his book, Cosmology and the Self, Troels Engberg-Pedersen refers to this concept of true human self within a stoic understanding, as “prohairesis,” where he seeks to outline it as it relates to the being of a Christian. Engberg makes the distinction that in looking at a person's capacity for decision-making, but also a sense of ‘self’ that recognizes commonality with fellow human beings, and a sense of other-centeredness:

completely independent of the world at large (including his own body and everything that pertains to that) and also one who cares for other human beings..

Within Troels Engberg-Pedersen's scholarship, he describes the sensibilities and social structures within a Hellenistic society, in order that he might further illustrate the significance of the Apostle Paul's writings as a continuation of spiritual understanding of the faith community, and demonstrate the influences of the period of Paul's writings. In doing so, Engberg-Pedersen gives us a glimpse of what implications Paul's society provides for the Church in current history. The influences of the social surroundings within Greco-Roman world heavily influences his letters and provides modern scholarship with significant considerations within the structure we see within the Church today.

Through an understanding of the situational nature of Paul's writings within his historical context, there can be a gain of better appreciation for the deeper themes that still have relevance for the mission of the Christian church in a 21st-century context. Above all, Engberg-Pedersen, while considering the historical implications of Paul's work within his letters to the early Christian communities, advocates that modern Christians follow in Paul's footsteps by focusing on a missionary vision for living out their encounters with Christ and the pneuma. In remaining in communion with the spirit and Christ Jesus, and striving to proclaim the gospel message, Pedersen also believes that it is important to keep a healthy, realistic perspective regarding a person's humanity. In the way that he interprets the Letters of St. Paul, Troels Engberg-Pedersen expresses that in Paul's call to bring the gospel to the Gentiles, Paul sets forth a model of discipleship that spans beyond his place in history, but rather provides a structure for Christianity which will continue to guide the Church into the future.

== Bibliography ==
- The Stoic Theory of Oikeiosis: Moral Development and Social Interaction in Early Stoic Philosophy; (Aarhus University Press), 1990
- Paul in His Hellenistic Context Edinburgh (T&T Clark), 1994
- Paul and the Stoics, Edinburgh (T&T Clark) and Louisville (Westminster John Knox), 2000.
- Paul Beyond the Judaism/Hellenism Divide, Louisville (Westminster, John Knox), 2001
- Early Christian Paraenesis in Context (co-ed. with James Starr) Berlin/New York (Walter de Gruyter), 2004
- Cosmology and Self in the Apostle Paul: The Material Spirit, Oxford (Oxford University Press), 2010
- Stoicism in Early Christianity (co-ed. Tuomas Rasimus and Ismo Dunderberg) Grand Rapids, Mich. (Baker Academic), 2010
- The First Gospel: A Conversation on the Gospel of Mark (with Geert Hallbäck), Copenhagen (ANIS), 2014
- Engberg-Pedersen's Interpretation of The Letters of St. Paul
- John and Philosophy: A New Reading of the Fourth Gospel, Oxford (Oxford University Press), 2017
