= Structuralism =

Intellectual current and methodological approach in the social science

Structuralism is an intellectual current and methodological approach, primarily in the social sciences, that interprets elements of human culture by way of their relationship to a broader system. It works to uncover the structural patterns that underlie all things that humans do, think, perceive, and feel.

Alternatively, as summarized by philosopher Simon Blackburn, structuralism is:

"The belief that phenomena of human life are not intelligible except through their interrelations. These relations constitute a structure, and behind local variations in the surface phenomena there are constant laws of abstract structure."

== History and background ==
The term structuralism is ambiguous, referring to different schools of thought in different contexts. As such, the movement in humanities and social sciences called structuralism relates to sociology. Emile Durkheim based his sociological concept on 'structure' and 'function', and from his work emerged the sociological approach of structural functionalism.

Apart from Durkheim's use of the term structure, the semiological concept of Ferdinand de Saussure became fundamental for structuralism. Saussure conceived language and society as a system of relations. His linguistic approach was also a refutation of evolutionary linguistics.

Structuralism in Europe developed in the early 20th century, mainly in France and the Russian Empire, in the structural linguistics of Ferdinand de Saussure and the subsequent Prague, Moscow, and Copenhagen schools of linguistics. After World War II, an array of scholars in the humanities borrowed Saussure's concepts for use in their respective fields. French anthropologist Claude Lévi-Strauss was arguably the first such scholar, sparking a widespread interest in structuralism.

Russian functional linguist Roman Jakobson was an important figure in the adaptation of structural analysis to disciplines beyond linguistics, including philosophy, anthropology, and literary theory. Jakobson influenced anthropologist Claude Lévi-Strauss, by whose work the term structuralism first appeared in reference to social sciences. Lévi-Strauss' work in turn gave rise to the structuralist movement in France, also called French structuralism, influencing the thinking of other writers, most of whom disavowed themselves as being a part of this movement. This included such writers as Louis Althusser and psychoanalyst Jacques Lacan, as well as the structural Marxism of Nicos Poulantzas. Roland Barthes and Jacques Derrida focused on how structuralism could be applied to literature.

Throughout the 1940s and 1950s, existentialism, such as that propounded by Jean-Paul Sartre, had been the dominant European intellectual movement. Structuralism rose to prominence in France in the wake of existentialism, particularly in the 1960s. The initial popularity of structuralism in France led to its spread across the globe. By the early 1960s, structuralism as a movement was coming into its own and some believed that it offered a single unified approach to human life that would embrace all disciplines.

By the late 1960s, many of structuralism's basic tenets came under attack from a new wave of predominantly French intellectuals/philosophers such as historian Michel Foucault, Jacques Derrida, Marxist philosopher Louis Althusser, and literary critic Roland Barthes. Though elements of their work necessarily relate to structuralism and are informed by it, these theorists eventually came to be referred to as post-structuralists. Many proponents of structuralism, such as Lacan, continue to influence continental philosophy and many of the fundamental assumptions of some of structuralism's post-structuralist critics are a continuation of structuralist thinking.

=== Ferdinand de Saussure ===
The origins of structuralism are connected with the work of Ferdinand de Saussure on linguistics along with the linguistics of the Prague and Moscow schools. In brief, Saussure's structural linguistics propounded three related concepts.

1. Saussure argued for a distinction between langue (an idealized abstraction of language) and parole (language as actually used in daily life). He argued that a "sign" is composed of a "signified" (signifié, i.e. an abstract concept or idea) and a "signifier" (signifiant, i.e. the perceived sound/visual image).
2. Because different languages have different words to refer to the same objects or concepts, there is no intrinsic reason why a specific signifier is used to express a given concept or idea. It is thus "arbitrary."
3. Signs gain their meaning from their relationships and contrasts with other signs. As he wrote, "in language, there are only differences 'without positive terms.'"

=== Lévi-Strauss ===
Structuralism emphasized underlying relations and systems rather than individual choice. One of the earliest and most influential works associated with this approach was Lévi-Strauss's 1949 study The Elementary Structures of Kinship. During World War II, Lévi-Strauss was at the New School in New York City, where he came into contact with Roman Jakobson; Jakobson's work, together with currents in American Anthropology, helped shape the development of his structural approach.

In The Elementary Structures of Kinship, Lévi-Strauss examined kinship systems from a structural perspective, arguing that apparently dissimilar forms of social organization could be understood as permutations of a limited number of basic relations. He returned to these questions in Structural Anthropology (1958), a collection of essays that helped define the scope and method of structuralism.

=== Lacan and Piaget ===
Blending Freud and Saussure, French (post)structuralist Jacques Lacan applied structuralism to psychoanalysis. Similarly, Jean Piaget applied structuralism to the study of psychology, though in a different way. Piaget, who would better define himself as constructivist, considered structuralism as "a method and not a doctrine," because, for him, "there exists no structure without a construction, abstract or genetic."

=== 'Third order' ===
Proponents of structuralism argue that a specific domain of culture may be understood by means of a structure that is modelled on language and is distinct both from the organizations of reality and those of ideas, or the imagination—the "third order." In Lacan's psychoanalytic theory, for example, the structural order of "the Symbolic" is distinguished both from "the Real" and "the Imaginary;" similarly, in Althusser's Marxist theory, the structural order of the capitalist mode of production is distinct both from the actual, real agents involved in its relations and from the ideological forms in which those relations are understood.

=== Althusser ===
Although French theorist Louis Althusser is often associated with structural social analysis, which helped give rise to "structural Marxism," such association was contested by Althusser himself in the Italian foreword to the second edition of Reading Capital. In this foreword Althusser states the following:

Despite the precautions we took to distinguish ourselves from the 'structuralist' ideology…, despite the decisive intervention of categories foreign to 'structuralism'…, the terminology we employed was too close in many respects to the 'structuralist' terminology not to give rise to an ambiguity. With a very few exceptions…our interpretation of Marx has generally been recognized and judged, in homage to the current fashion, as 'structuralist'.… We believe that despite the terminological ambiguity, the profound tendency of our texts was not attached to the 'structuralist' ideology.

=== Assiter ===
In a later development, feminist theorist Alison Assiter enumerated four ideas common to the various forms of structuralism:

1. a structure determines the position of each element of a whole;
2. every system has a structure;
3. structural laws deal with co-existence rather than change; and
4. structures are the "real things" that lie beneath the surface or the appearance of meaning.

== In linguistics ==
In Ferdinand de Saussure's Course in General Linguistics, the analysis focuses not on the use of language (parole, 'speech'), but rather on the underlying system of language (langue). This approach examines how the elements of language relate to each other in the present, synchronically rather than diachronically. Saussure argued that linguistic signs were composed of two parts:

1. a signifiant ('signifier'): the "sound pattern" of a word, either in mental projection—e.g., as when one silently recites lines from signage, a poem to one's self—or in actual speech, any kind of text, physical realization as part of a speech act.
2. a signifié ('signified'): the concept or meaning of the word.

This differed from previous approaches that focused on the relationship between words and the things in the world that they designate.

Although not fully developed by Saussure, other key notions in structural linguistics can be found in structural "idealism." A structural idealism is a class of linguistic units (lexemes, morphemes, or even constructions) that are possible in a certain position in a given syntagm, or linguistic environment (such as a given sentence). The different functional role of each of these members of the paradigm is called 'value' (French: valeur).

=== Prague School ===
In France, Antoine Meillet and Émile Benveniste continued Saussure's project, and members of the Prague school of linguistics such as Roman Jakobson and Nikolai Trubetzkoy conducted influential research. The clearest and most important example of Prague school structuralism lies in phonemics. Rather than simply compiling a list of which sounds occur in a language, the Prague school examined how they were related. They determined that the inventory of sounds in a language could be analysed as a series of contrasts.

Thus, in English, the sounds /p/ and /b/ represent distinct phonemes because there are cases (minimal pairs) where the contrast between the two is the only difference between two distinct words (e.g. 'pat' and 'bat'). Analyzing sounds in terms of contrastive features also opens up comparative scope—for instance, it makes clear the difficulty Japanese speakers have differentiating /r/ and /l/ in English and other languages is because these sounds are not contrastive in Japanese. Phonology would become the paradigmatic basis for structuralism in a number of different fields.

Based on the Prague school concept, André Martinet in France, J. R. Firth in the UK and Louis Hjelmslev in Denmark developed their own versions of structural and functional linguistics.

== In anthropology ==
According to structural theory in anthropology and social anthropology, meaning is produced and reproduced within a culture through various practices, phenomena, and activities that serve as systems of signification.

A structuralist approach may study activities as diverse as food-preparation and serving rituals, religious rites, games, literary and non-literary texts, and other forms of entertainment to discover the deep structures by which meaning is produced and reproduced within the culture. For example, Lévi-Strauss analysed in the 1950s cultural phenomena including mythology, kinship (the alliance theory and the incest taboo), and food preparation. In addition to these studies, he produced more linguistically-focused writings in which he applied Saussure's distinction between langue and parole in his search for the fundamental structures of the human mind, arguing that the structures that form the "deep grammar" of society originate in the mind and operate in people unconsciously. Lévi-Strauss took inspiration from mathematics.

Another concept used in structural anthropology came from the Prague school of linguistics, where Roman Jakobson and others analysed sounds based on the presence or absence of certain features (e.g., voiceless vs. voiced). Lévi-Strauss included this in his conceptualization of the universal structures of the mind, which he held to operate based on pairs of binary oppositions such as hot-cold, male-female, culture-nature, cooked-raw, or marriageable vs. tabooed women.

A third influence came from Marcel Mauss (1872–1950), who had written on gift-exchange systems. Based on Mauss, for instance, Lévi-Strauss argued an alliance theory—that kinship systems are based on the exchange of women between groups—as opposed to the 'descent'-based theory described by Edward Evans-Pritchard and Meyer Fortes. While replacing Mauss at his Ecole Pratique des Hautes Etudes chair, the writings of Lévi-Strauss became widely popular in the 1960s and 1970s and gave rise to the term "structuralism" itself.

In Britain, authors such as Rodney Needham and Edmund Leach were highly influenced by structuralism. Authors such as Maurice Godelier and Emmanuel Terray combined Marxism with structural anthropology in France. In the United States, authors such as Marshall Sahlins and James Boon built on structuralism to provide their own analysis of human society. Structural anthropology fell out of favour in the early 1980s for a number of reasons. D'Andrade suggests that this was because it made unverifiable assumptions about the universal structures of the human mind. Authors such as Eric Wolf argued that political economy and colonialism should be at the forefront of anthropology. More generally, criticisms of structuralism by Pierre Bourdieu led to a concern with how cultural and social structures were changed by human agency and practice, a trend which Sherry Ortner has referred to as 'practice theory'.

One example is Douglas E. Foley's Learning Capitalist Culture (2010), in which he applied a mixture of structural and Marxist theories to his ethnographic fieldwork among high school students in Texas. Foley analyzed how they reach a shared goal through the lens of social solidarity when he observed "Mexicanos" and "Anglo-Americans" come together on the same football team to defeat the school's rivals. However, he also continually applies a marxist lens and states that he, "wanted to wow peers with a new cultural marxist theory of schooling."

Some anthropological theorists, however, while finding considerable fault with Lévi-Strauss's version of structuralism, did not turn away from a fundamental structural basis for human culture. The Biogenetic Structuralism group for instance argued that some kind of structural foundation for culture must exist because all humans inherit the same system of brain structures. They proposed a kind of neuroanthropology which would lay the foundations for a more complete scientific account of cultural similarity and variation by requiring an integration of cultural anthropology and neuroscience—a program that theorists such as Victor Turner also embraced.

== In literary criticism and theory ==
In literary theory, structuralist criticism relates literary texts to a larger structure, which may be a particular genre, a range of intertextual connections (such as patterns of metaphor), a model of a universal narrative structure, or a system of recurrent patterns or motifs.

The field of structuralist semiotics argues that there must be a structure in every text, which explains why it is easier for experienced readers than for non-experienced readers to interpret a text. Everything that is written seems to be governed by rules, or "grammar of literature", that one learns in educational institutions and that are to be unmasked.

A potential problem for a structuralist interpretation is that it can be highly reductive; as scholar Catherine Belsey puts it: "the structuralist danger of collapsing all difference." An example of such a reading might be if a student concludes the authors of West Side Story did not write anything "really" new, because their work has the same structure as Shakespeare's Romeo and Juliet. In both texts a girl and a boy fall in love (a "formula" with a symbolic operator between them would be "Boy + Girl") despite the fact that they belong to two groups that hate each other ("Boy's Group - Girl's Group" or "Opposing forces") and conflict is resolved by their deaths. Structuralist readings focus on how the structures of the single text resolve inherent narrative tensions. If a structuralist reading focuses on multiple texts, there must be some way in which those texts unify themselves into a coherent system. The versatility of structuralism is such that a literary critic could make the same claim about a story of two friendly families ("Boy's Family + Girl's Family") that arrange a marriage between their children despite the fact that the children hate each other ("Boy - Girl") and then the children commit suicide to escape the arranged marriage; the justification is that the second story's structure is an 'inversion' of the first story's structure: the relationship between the values of love and the two pairs of parties involved have been reversed.

Structuralist literary criticism argues that the "literary banter of a text" can lie only in new structure, rather than in the specifics of character development and voice in which that structure is expressed. Literary structuralism often follows the lead of Vladimir Propp, Algirdas Julien Greimas, and Claude Lévi-Strauss in seeking out basic deep elements in stories, myths, and more recently, anecdotes, which are combined in various ways to produce the many versions of the ur-story or ur-myth.

There is considerable similarity between structural literary theory and Northrop Frye's archetypal criticism, which is also indebted to the anthropological study of myths. Some critics have also tried to apply the theory to individual works, but the effort to find unique structures in individual literary works runs counter to the structuralist program and has an affinity with New Criticism.

== Interpretations and general criticisms ==
Structuralism is less popular today than other approaches, such as post-structuralism and deconstruction. Structuralism has often been criticized for being ahistorical and for favouring deterministic structural forces over the ability of people to act. As the political turbulence of the 1960s and 1970s (particularly the student uprisings of May 1968) began affecting academia, issues of power and political struggle moved to the center of public attention.

By the end of the century, structuralism was seen as a historically important school of thought, but the movements that it spawned, rather than structuralism itself, commanded attention.

Several social theorists and academics have strongly criticized structuralism or even dismissed it. French hermeneutic philosopher Paul Ricœur (1969) criticized Lévi-Strauss for overstepping the limits of validity of the structuralist approach, ending up in what Ricœur described as "a Kantianism without a transcendental subject."

Anthropologist Adam Kuper (1973) argued that:

'Structuralism' came to have something of the momentum of a millennial movement and some of its adherents felt that they formed a secret society of the seeing in a world of the blind. Conversion was not just a matter of accepting a new paradigm. It was, almost, a question of salvation.

Philip Noel Pettit (1975) called for an abandoning of "the positivist dream which Lévi-Strauss dreamed for semiology," arguing that semiology is not to be placed among the natural sciences. Cornelius Castoriadis (1975) criticized structuralism as failing to explain symbolic mediation in the social world; he viewed structuralism as a variation on the "logicist" theme, arguing that, contrary to what structuralists advocate, language—and symbolic systems in general—cannot be reduced to logical organizations on the basis of the binary logic of oppositions.

Critical theorist Jürgen Habermas (1985) accused structuralists like Foucault of being positivists; Foucault, while not an ordinary positivist per se, paradoxically uses the tools of science to criticize science, according to Habermas (see Performative contradiction and Foucault–Habermas debate). Sociologist Anthony Giddens (1993) is another notable critic; while Giddens draws on a range of structuralist themes in his theorizing, he dismisses the structuralist view that the reproduction of social systems is merely "a mechanical outcome."

== See also ==
- Abstraction
- Antihumanism
- Émile Durkheim
- Engaged theory
- Genetic structuralism
- Holism
- Post-structuralism
- Russian formalism
- Structural functionalism
- Structuralism (philosophy of mathematics)
- Structuralism (philosophy of science)
- Structuralist film theory
- Structuration theory
- Structural change
- Structuralism (psychology)
- Structuralist economics
