= Structural approach =

Second-language acquisition technique

Structural approach is an approach in the study of language that emphasizes the examination of language in very detailed manner. This strategy, which is considered a traditional approach, examines language products such as sounds, morphemes, words, sentences, and vocabulary, among others. It also facilitates the process of learning language on the basis of structures.

== Background ==
The structural approach to the study of language is traced back to the works of the Swiss linguist Ferdinand de Saussure. For Saussure, language must be evaluated by looking at its present state as opposed to its analysis based on its history or how language changed over time. He argued that language functioned as a communicative system consisted of verbal as well as written symbols and that language is organic since it is the result of decisions made by individual speakers. Consequent works on the structuralist approach used Saussure's focus not on particular languages but on language as a whole and its deep structures. As an approach to the examination of the language system, the Saussurian conceptualization and its adherents are concerned with the underlying structural rules and these produce meanings. This evolved into the modern conceptualization that feature four basic principles: 1) language is essentially speech; 2) mastery of structures forms the core of the learning process; 3) structures possess the characteristic of a logical sequence, hence the language structures are graded; and, 4) full grading of structures is a basic requirement.

== Concept ==
The structural approach is a technique wherein the learner masters the pattern of sentence. Structures are the different arrangements of words in one accepted style or the other. It includes various modes in which clauses, phrases or word might be used. It is based on the assumptions that language can be best learnt through a scientific selection and grading of the structures or patterns of sentences and vocabulary.

=== Definition ===
This approach as Kripa K. Gautam states "is based on the belief that language consists of 'structures' and that the mastery of these structures is more important than the acquisition of vocabulary. Since structure is what is important and unique about a language, early practice should focus on mastery of phonological and grammatical structures rather than on mastery of vocabulary." Kulkarni "emphasizes the teaching and learning of the basic items or materials that constitute the framework of language." Whereas according to Yardi 'structures' as an "internal ordering of linguistic item", and further adds that structures may be defined as "device that we use to make signal, to convey meanings, and indicate relationship."

=== Objectives ===
According to Menon and Patel the objectives of the new structural approach are as follows:-

- To lay the foundation of English by establishing through drill and repetition about 275 graded structures.
- To enable the children to attain mastery over an essential vocabulary of about 3000 root words for active use.
- To correlate the teaching of grammar and composition with the reading lesson.
- To teach the four fundamental skills, namely understanding, speaking, reading and writing in the order names.
- To lay proper emphasis on the aural- oral approach, activity methods and the condemnation of formal grammar for its own sake.

=== Main features of structural approach ===
The structural approach makes use of the following features for teaching the language:

- Word order – Word order or the pattern of form is very important in Language for e.g.:

a) Jo broke his toy

b) The toy broke Jo

sentence a) Jo broke his toy – makes proper sense. it shows the arrangement or pattern of words.

- The presence of function words:

Function words help in modifying meaning considered the following sentence -

for e.g.:

a) I ate an ice cream.

b) I'm eating an ice cream.

c) I will eat an ice cream.

In the above given example, we can see the modified meaning.

- the use of few Inflections:

By adding an affix, the base form of the word can be altered.e.g.:

a) In verbs: I play; he plays; I am playing; I played

b) In nouns; One boy; two boys; one man

c) In adjective and adverb: Great – Greater – Greatest

=== Principles of the structural approach ===
Prof. F.G.French has entitled the following principles underlying the structural approach:

1. Importance of Framing Language Habits.
2. Importance of Speech – The structural approach is based on the principle of effective used of speech.
3. Importance pupil's activity.
4. The Principles of Oral work – Oral work is the basis and all the rest are built up from it.
5. Each language as its own Grammar – Instead of teaching Grammar of the target language and its structures are to be taught.
6. Creation of different types of meaningful situations by dramatization, facial expression, actions etc. Is stressed upon.
7. One item of language is taught at one time.
8. Mastery of structures is emphasized.

== Selection of structures ==
How should a teacher select the structure to teach the learner. This involves the selection of structures. In the structural approach mainly the focus will be on structures. The following principles should be kept in mind while selecting structures :

- Usefulness – the structures, which are more frequent in use should be introduced first
- Productivity – some if the structures are productive, other structures can be built upon. for e.g.: we have two sentence pattern- a) Mr. Roy is here b) Here is Mr.Roy

the former pattern is productive because we can frame many sentences on the same pattern like – He is there etc.

- Simplicity – The simplicity of the structure depends upon the form and the meaning.
- Teach-ability – Items easy from teaching point of view.
- Frequency – The structures must be selected with a high frequency of occurrence.
- Range – to know, in how many contexts it is applicable
- Coverage – A word covering a number of meanings For e.g.: Meals
- Learnabiliy – teacher should focus on the items that are easy for students to learn should be taken first.

== Meaning of language ==
Language is the most powerful and central tool in achieving our educational goal. When it comes for examining language, words are focal points and we begin our investigation of language structure by looking at words from four of the following perspectives:

- Their parts should be meaningful.
- Their sounds of syllables that make them up.
- The principles that organize them into phrases and sentences.
- The semantic relationships that link them in sets.

Its only through language, a person tries to express is thought, feelings, moods, aspiration which influence the ultimate and deepest foundation of the society.

=== Importance of language in the modern world ===
English plays an important role in our present Educational system and also in our National life. It has become one of the common language and a person one who is fluent in speaking English can be a world citizen. India is a multi-lingual country where there are many languages spoken in different parts of our country. English language helps to communicate with ease. Through structural approach we can learn English or any other language fluently. Structural approach teaches to learn sentences in a systematic manner which involves the structure, sequencing and pattern arrangement of a words to make a proper and complete sentences with meaning. Today the importance of English cannot be overestimated. It is a global language and it is the language of opportunities for the millions of youth around the world.

=== Maximum use of the foreign language ===
The emphasis by structural approach on the teaching of the graded structures of a language means that the classroom should have the maximum foreign language environment. This is characteristic feature in structural approach. Where grammar-translation method is used, the classroom is characterized by two factors: 1) practice in reading and writing and 2) maximum use of mother-tongue. In reaction to these practices structural approach advocates methods which would include – a) practice in the speech-skills, not because reading and writing should be neglected (as would be the case in the direct method), but that the teaching of the graded structures can be better undertaken through aural-oral work.

== Gradation of structure ==
Structural approach upholds the teaching of English as a foreign language through the teaching of the structures of the language. The questions which structural approach attempts to answer primarily are: (1) should the structural items and sentence patterns to be graded? (2) how shall they be graded? and (3) what should be the fundamental principles of grading the structural items? through gradation of structure, we can get answers for the following Questions.

Gradation means grouping synonyms. In structural approach, gradation of structure can be taught by using the following patterns that should be taught at early stages:

1. Grouping :-

a) Phonetic grouping – group according to sound. for example: cat, rat, mat etc.

b) Lexical grouping – grouping according to words used in same situation.

c) grammatical grouping – pattern of sentences similar should be taught together.

d) Semantic grouping – Words having similar meaning grouped together.

e) Structure Grouping – selecting items that are fit for each other.

2. Sequencing :-

a) Grammatical sequencing – it will tell that it follows which structure. e.g.: I was watching a movie. I was watching a movie with my friend.

b) Semantic sequencing – A word having different meanings e.g.: The ball is there, under the bed. There are many balls in the bag.

c) Lexical sequencing – It Tells which word follows which e.g.: sit-stand, come-go, high-low

3. Types of patterns of sentences:

there are different patterns of sentence. as follows below:

a) Two- part patterns like She goes (she / goes)

b) Three-part patterns e.g.: He is reading (He / is / reading)

c) Four-part patterns e.g.: Geetha went to school (Geetha/went/to/school)

d) Patterns beginning with 'there', 'wh' type question e.g.: There are five baskets in the rack. What is your name?

e) Patterns of Command and Request e.g.: come here, sit down, stand up etc.

f) Formal pattern – like Good Morning, Thank You etc.

4. Sentence patterns

The structures may have the following pattern like:

a) Statement of Fact – mention simple facts e.g.: Pinky gets up at 6 a.m. She takes bath. she eats her breakfast. she goes to school. (subject-verb-object pattern)

b) Imperative sentence – Question form verb-subject-object pattern e.g.: Did Pinky come to school today? has she taken her breakfast ?

c) Imperative sentence (imply compliance) subject remains hidden. e.g.: (Pinky) Come here, Close the door, Bring your book etc.

5. Phrase patterns

Sentence using phases are called Phrase pattern. e.g.: That book is 'on the table'
