= Hans Jørgen Uldall =

Danish linguist (1907–1957)

Hans Jørgen Uldall (Danish: [hænˈɕɶɐ̯ˀn̩ ˈulˌtɛˀl]; 25 May 1907 Silkeborg, Denmark – 29 October 1957 Ibadan, Nigeria) was a Danish linguist known for developing the linguistic theory of glossematics with Louis Hjelmslev.

== Early life ==
Having studied English with Danish linguist Otto Jespersen at the University of Copenhagen he went to London to study phonology with Daniel Jones.

== Career ==
In 1929 he had a lectureship at the University of Cape Town, and then went back to London to teach phonetics in 1930. While in Cape Town, he corresponded with the doyen of American anthropology Franz Boas at Columbia, who secured him a grant of 2000 dollars to undertake field work on the Maidu language under the auspices of the Archaeological and Ethnographic Survey of California, established by A. L. Kroeber in 1901. On his way from Cape Town made a stop in Hamburg to attend the 24th congress of Americanists, before he and his wife continued their journey to California.

He spent 1931–32 in California working closely together with Kroeber and Jaime de Angulo who became his close friend. He became fluent in Maidu and accumulated a large body of notes and texts, but only published one article on Maidu phonetics in 1954. His texts and word lists were published in 1966 by William Shipley as "Nisenan texts and dictionary" (Univ. of California Publications XLVI). Uldall's phonetic transcriptions are considered extraordinarily detailed and accurate. For his work in California, Columbia University awarded him his MA degree in anthropology in 1944.

When he finished his studies in the US, the couple returned to Denmark in 1933, where he sought a topic in linguistic on which to work. Discarding the idea of working on languages of the New Guinea or Southeast Asia, colleagues suggested that he study the Danish dialect of Rovsø in Jutland. He worked there in the village of Udby for a year before his wife fell ill and the two had to leave the town collecting documentation and making detailed transcriptions of the local dialect, which came to form part of the Danish dialectological corpus after his death. During this period he also collaborated with his former mentor Otto Jespersen on a work on English phonology, which however never came to completion. This period also saw his collaboration with Louis Hjelmslev, which first was a study of the field they called "phonematics", but which developed to become part of Hjelmslev's glossematic theory. Hjelmslev's student, Eli Fischer-Jørgensen, later recalled their process of collaboration as organic to the degree that they were not always sure who had come up with which ideas.

After the death of his first wife in 1937, Uldall married the phonetician Elizabeth Theodora Uldall (Betsy, nee Anderson) (1913-2004), also a student of Daniel Jones. From 1939 to 1948 he worked for the British Council in locations such as Athens, Baghdad, Cairo and Alexandria, and after the war in Paraguay and Argentina, where he was appointed professor at the National University of Tucumán. In 1948 Betsy Uldall settled at the University of Edinburgh where she taught phonetics, and Hans-Jørgen joined her, collaborating on the Dialect Survey of Scotland project. In 1953 he went to Indiana University as visiting professor of linguistics, then in 1954 he moved to Nigeria as director of the newly founded seminar on phonetics at the University College Ibadan. There he died from a heart attack in 1957.

During his time abroad, Hjelmslev had continued his own work on developing the glossematic approach, and published his main work on the matter. Uldall, writing separately on his part of the work, had drifted away from Hjelmslevs idea on several points, and when he finished his Outline of Glossematics, a Study in the Methodology of the Humanities with Special Reference to Linguistics. Part I: General Theory it was no longer in line with Hjelmslevs thinking. Hence, the two main volumes on glossematic theory by Hjelmslev and Uldall respectively, each present a separate version of the theory.
