= Peter Harder (academic) =

Danish linguist

Peter Harder is a Danish linguist and professor of English language at the University of Copenhagen. He is notable as a cofounder of the Danish Functional Linguistics stage of the Copenhagen School in linguistics. He has worked extensively with functional linguistic theories and speech act theory. In Denmark, he is best known amongst the general public for his outspoken criticism against the Danish government's tight regulation of research, which he perceives as a threat to academic freedom.

== Publications ==
- (2010) Meaning in Mind and Society: A Functional Contribution to the Social Turn in Cognitive Linguistics. (Cognitive Linguistics Research). Berlin: Mouton de Gruyter. 528 pp.
- (2005) Elisabeth Engberg-Pedersen, Michael Fortescue, Peter Harder, Lars Heltoft, Michael Herslund & Lisbeth Falster Jakobsen: Dansk Funktionel Lingvistik - en helhedsforståelse af forholdet mellem sprogstruktur, sprogbrug og kognition. Københavns Universitet & RUC: København.
- (2003) The Status of Linguistic Facts: Rethinking the Relation between Cognition, Social Institution and Utterance from a Functional Point of View. Mind and Language 18, 1, 52-76
- (2003) Mental spaces: Exactly when do we need them? Cognitive Linguistics 14‑1, 91-96.
- (1999) Partial Autonomy. Ontology and Methodology in Cognitive Linguistics, in Theo Janssen and Gisela Redeker (eds.), Cognitive Linguistics: Foundations, Scope and Methodology, Berlin/New York: Mouton de Gruyter, 195-222.
- (1999) Function, Cognition and Layered Clause Structure, in Jens Allwood and Peter Gärdenfors (eds.) Cognitive Semantics, Amsterdam/Philadelphia: John Benjamins. 37-66.
- (1996) Functional Semantics: A Theory of Meaning, Structure and Tense in English. (Trends in Linguistics: Studies and Monographs 87). Berlin/New York: Mouton de Gruyter. 586 pp.
