= Louis Hjelmslev =

Danish linguist (1899–1965)

- Born: 3 October 1899; Copenhagen, Denmark
- Died: 30 May 1965 (aged 65); Ordrup, Denmark
- Education: University of Copenhagen
- Known for: Work in the field of semiotics; Hjelmslev's law
- Spouse: Vibeke Mackeprang
- Scientific career
- Fields: Linguistics, semiotics, comparative linguistics
- Workplaces: University of Copenhagen

Louis Trolle Hjelmslev (Danish: [ˈjelˀmsle̝w]; 3 October 1899 – 30 May 1965) was a Danish linguist whose ideas formed the basis of the Copenhagen School of linguistics. Born into an academic family (his father was the mathematician Johannes Hjelmslev), Hjelmslev studied comparative linguistics in Copenhagen, Prague and Paris (with Antoine Meillet and Joseph Vendryes, among others). In 1931, he founded the Cercle Linguistique de Copenhague. Together with Hans Jørgen Uldall he developed a structuralist theory of language which he called glossematics, which further developed the semiotic theory of Ferdinand de Saussure. Glossematics as a theory of language is characterized by a high degree of formalism. It is interested in describing the formal and semantic characteristics of language in separation from sociology, psychology or neurobiology, and has a high degree of logical rigour. Hjelmslev regarded linguistics – or glossematics – as a formal science. He was a pioneer of formal linguistics. Hjelmslev's theory became widely influential in structural and functional grammar, and in semiotics.

== Early biography ==
Hjelmslev, born in 1899 in Copenhagen, enrolled into the University of Copenhagen in 1917 to study Romance and (later) comparative philology; in Copenhagen he studied with Holger Pedersen among others. His MA thesis on Lithuanian phonetics, based on fieldwork in Lithuania in 1921, was finished in 1923- He received a doctorate in comparative Indo-European philology for his Études baltiques from 1932, and in 1937 took over Holger Pedersen's chair in Copenhagen after having lectured in Aarhus from 1934.

He married Vibeke Mackeprang.

== The Linguistic Circle of Copenhagen ==
The Linguistic Circle of Copenhagen was founded by Hjelmslev and a group of Danish colleagues on 24 September 1931. Their main inspiration was the Prague Linguistic Circle, which had been founded in 1926. It was, in the first place, a forum for discussion of theoretical and methodological problems in linguistics. Initially, their interest lay mainly in developing an alternative concept of the phoneme, but it later developed into a complete theory which was coined glossematics, and was notably influenced by structuralism. Membership of the group grew rapidly and a significant list of publications resulted, including an irregular series of larger works under the name Travaux du Cercle Linguistique de Copenhague. A Bulletin was produced, followed by an international journal for structuralistic research in language, Acta Linguistica (later called Acta Linguistica Hafniensia), which was founded with the members of the Prague Linguistic Circle. It was, at that time, the sole journal explicitly dedicated to structuralism. With one short break from 1934 to 1937, while he lectured at the Aarhus University, Hjelmslev acted as chairman of the Circle until shortly before his death in 1965. The Linguist Circle of Copenhagen still exists today and arranges seminars, publishes Acta Linguistica Hafniensia and runs subcommittees.

== Theoretical work ==
Hjelmslev published his first paper at the age of 25. His first major book, Principes de grammaire générale, which he finished in 1928, is an invaluable source for anyone interested in Hjelmslev's work. During the 1930s Hjelmslev wrote another book, La catégorie des cas, which was a major contribution to linguistics. In this book, Hjelmslev analysed the general category of case in detail, providing ample empirical material supporting his hypotheses. It is important to read Hjelmslev's work as a continuous evolving theory on the epistemology of linguistics. He made his first academic journey at 1921 to Lithuania to study Lithuanian, an experience which can be traced throughout his works.

His most well-known book, Omkring sprogteoriens grundlæggelse, or in English translation, Prolegomena to a Theory of Language, first published in 1943, critiques the then-prevailing methodologies in linguistics as being descriptive, even anecdotal, and not systematising. He proposed a linguistic theory intended to form the basis of a more rational linguistics and a contribution to general epistemology. Like Ferdinand de Saussure (1857–1913), he accepted language as a system of signs, from the point of view of language use. He argued that a theory of semiotics should be consistent within itself, comprehensive, and as simple as possible.

=== Hjelmslev's sign model ===
Hjelmslev's sign model is a development of Saussure's bilateral sign model. Saussure considered a sign as having two sides, signifier and signified. Hjelmslev famously renamed signifier and signified as respectively expression plane and content plane, and also distinguished between form and substance. The combinations of the four would distinguish between form of content, form of expression, substance of content, and substance of expression. In Hjelmslev's analysis, a sign is a function between two forms, the content form and the expression form, and this is the starting point of linguistic analysis. However, every sign function is also manifested by two substances: the content substance and the expression substance. The content substance is the physical and conceptual manifestation of the sign. The expression substance is the physical substance wherein a sign is manifested. This substance can be sound, as is the case for most known languages, but it can be any material support whatsoever, for instance, hand movements, as is the case for sign languages, or distinctive marks on a suitable medium as in the multiple different writing systems of the world.

In short, Hjelmslev was proposing an open-ended, scientific method of analysis as a new semiotics. In proposing this, he was reacting against the conventional view in phonetics that sounds should be the focus of enquiry. Some have interpreted his work as if Hjelmslev argued that no sign can be interpreted unless it is contextualised – treating his functives, expression and content as the general connotative mechanisms (for instance by Algirdas Julius Greimas) – for Hjelmslev the point of view of the linguist on meaning is that of the form of content. Even if the content substance is important, one has to analyse it from the point of view of the form. Not only do pictures and literature manifest the same organising principles, but, more broadly, seeing and hearing, though certainly not identical, interact in surprisingly complex ways at deeper levels of the sign hierarchy which Hjelmslev sought to understand.

== Assessment ==
Hjelmslev made a bold proposal to transform technical analysis into a broad enquiry, emphasising that the true focus of linguistics should be the language and the human culture that continually reinvents it, and all society's memory of its accumulated knowledge preserved through language. This was a challenging but constructive argument at the time, and remains one that still has relevance today. Most conspicuously, Hjelmslev's lines of inquiry have been taken up by Gilles Deleuze and Félix Guattari (see the "Postulates of Linguistics" and "Geology of Morals" chapters of A Thousand Plateaus), and subsequently their followers.

== Terminology ==
Hjelmslev introduced the terms glosseme, ceneme, prosodeme and plereme as linguistic units, analogous to phoneme, morpheme, etc.

Also, his most famous work, Prolegomena to a Theory of Language, is mostly concerned with the formal definition of a terminology for the analysis of any level of a system of signs, and as such there exists an exclusively Hjelmslevian terminology for that.

== Selected publications ==
- Hjelmslev, Louis (1928). Principes de grammaire générale. Copenhague: Bianco Lundo.
- Hjelmslev, Louis (1935/37). Catégorie des cas (2 volumes). Acta Jutlandica VII, IX.
- Hjelmslev, Louis (1953[1943]). Prolegomena to a Theory of Language. Baltimore: Indiana University Publications in Anthropology and Linguistics (IJAL Memoir, 7) (2nd OD (slightly rev.): Madison: University of Wisconsin Press, 1961. Dt.: Hjelmslev 1974.
- Hjelmslev, Louis (1956). Sur l'indépendance de l'épithète. Copenhague: Historisk-filologiske Meddelelser udgivet af Det Kongelige Danske Videnskabernes Selskab, i kommission hos Ejnar Munksgaard.
- Hjelmslev, Louis (1975). Résumé of a Theory of Language. Travaux du Cercle linguistique de Copenhague, vol. XVI. Copenhague: Nordisk Sprog- og Kulturforlag.
