= List of University of Wollongong people =

This is a list of University of Wollongong people including notable alumni and staff.

== Administration ==
Chancellors The chancellor of the University of Wollongong serves as the nominal head of the university. As with most other university chancellors, the role is now largely ceremonial.

- 1975–1996 Robert Marsden Hope
- 1997–2009 Mike Codd
- 2009–present Jillian Broadbent

Vice chancellors The vice- hancellor of the University of Wollongong serves as the chief executive officer of the university, and oversees most of the university's day-to-day operations.

- 1975–1980 Michael Birt
- 1981–1994 Ken McKinnon
- 1995–2011 Gerald Sutton
- 2012–2021 Paul Wellings
- 2021–present Patricia Davidson

== Staff ==
- Noel Cressie – Distinguished Professor of Spatial Statistics
- Beverly Derewianka – emeritus professor of linguistics
- Andrew Ford – English-born Australian composer, writer and radio presenter
- Kristine French – plant biologist and conservationist
- Jenny Hammond – linguist
- Richard Harland – author
- Christian Heim – composer, psychiatrist
- Rob Hood – author
- Natalie Matosin – National Health and Medical Research Council CJ Martin Early Career Research Fellow
- Cecilia Nembou – educator, women's rights activist, and first female vice chancellor for a university in Papua New Guinea
- Sharon Robinson – Antarctic researcher and plant physiologist
- Willy Susilo – cryptographer, IEEE Fellow
- Gordon Wallace – electromaterials scientist
- Alan Wearne – poet

== Alumni ==
In 2012, in a survey of over 5,000 employers, the QS World University Rankings placed UOW at 99th in the world for graduate employability. As of 2014, the university has turned out more than a hundred thousand graduates, and also has members all over the world in 143 countries. Many alumni live in Wollongong and Sydney, and a significant number also live in Melbourne, Brisbane, Canberra, Singapore, Kuala Lumpur, Hong Kong, London, New York and Washington, D.C.

- Estelle Asmodelle – transgender model, writer and activist
- Van Badham – writer
- Glenn Barkley – director, Museum of Contemporary Art, Sydney
- Kate Bell – actor, Blue Water High
- Clare Bowen – actor, Nashville
- Mez Breeze – new media artist
- Matt Brown – politician, academic and solicitor
- Michael Byrne – poet
- Jay Caselberg – author
- Jo Clay – politician, leader of the ACT Greens
- Ben Creagh – rugby league player for the St. George Illawarra Dragons NRL team
- Cromok – Malaysian thrash metal band
- Mark Cutifani – CEO, AngloAmerican
- Stef Dawson – actress, The Hunger Games
- Bryan Doyle MP – NSW state member for Campbelltown
- Lee Furlong – television presenter; Fox Sports news reader; wife of Australian cricketer Shane Watson
- Nita Green – Labor senator for Queensland
- Zaiping Guo – professor and materials engineer
- David Hurley – former Australian chief of Defence Force, governor of New South Wales
- Stephen Jones – member of the Australian Parliament
- "Dr Karl" Kruszelnicki – scientist, author and commentator
- Stephen Martin – former Federal Parliamentary speaker
- George McHugh – Big 4 auditor
- Julian McMahon – actor; son of former Australian Prime Minister Sir William McMahon
- Clinton Mead – mayor of Campbelltown City Council
- Josh Morris – rugby league player for the Bulldogs NRL team
- Bill Neskovski – playwright
- Jamie Peacock – England and Great Britain rugby league captain
- Netatua Pelesikoti – Tongan environmental scientist
- Wendy Richardson – playwright
- B. Sandhya – additional director general of Police of Kerala state in India; author
- Thomas Spohr – solicitor and prosecutor
- Roger Summons – professor of geobiology, Massachusetts Institute of Technology
- Kumi Taguchi – Australian Broadcasting Corporation newsreader
- Melanie Tait – writer and broadcaster
- Victoria Thaine – actor, The Caterpillar Wish
- John Tranter – poet
- Bundit Ungrangsee – orchestral conductor
- Julienne van Loon – novelist
- Gareth Ward – local councillor on Shoalhaven City Council; Graduate Member of University Council; politician
- Graham West – vice president, St Vincent De Pauls
- Alex Zelinsky – Chief Defence Scientist of Australia; co-founder of Seeing Machines Limited; serves on UOW Council

== See also ==
- University of Wollongong alumni
- Academic staff of the University of Wollongong
