= Tenor (linguistics) =

Concept in linguistics

In systemic functional linguistics, the term tenor refers to the participants in a discourse, their relationships to each other, and their purposes.

In examining how context affects language use, linguists refer to the context-specific variety of language as a register. The three aspects of the context are known as field, tenor and mode. Field refers to the subject matter or content being discussed. Mode refers to the channel (such as writing, or video-conference) of the communication. By understanding these three variables, the kind of language likely to be used in a particular setting can be predicted — and, Michael Halliday suggests, this is exactly what we do, unconsciously, as language users.

== See also ==
- Affect (linguistics)
- Cate Poynton
- Appraisal (discourse analysis)
