= Cate Poynton =

Australian linguist

Catherine "Cate" McKean Poynton (1942 – 2021) was an Australian linguist known for her contributions to systemic functional linguistics. Her work focused on the relationship between language, gender, and social relations. Poynton was a pioneer in the description of tenor and interpersonal meaning, which later became foundational to the development of the appraisal framework.

She held appointments at the University of South Australia, and at Western Sydney University.

== Bibliography ==
- Poynton, Cate. "Names as vocatives: Forms and functions." Nottingham Linguistic Circular 13. 1984: 1-34.
- Poynton, Cate. Language and Gender: Making the Difference. Deakin University. 1985.
- Poynton, Cate. "Terms of address in Australian English." Australian English: the language of a new society. 1989: 55–69.
- Poynton, Cate. Address and the semiotics of social relations: A systemic-functional account of address forms and practices in Australian English. PhD thesis. University of Sydney, 1990.
- Poynton, Cate. "Grammar, language and the social: Poststructuralism and systemic-functional linguistics." Social Semiotics 3.1. 1993: 1-21.
- Poynton, Cate. "Naming women’s workplace skills’." Pink Collar Blues: Work, Gender and Technology, Melbourne University Press.1993.
- Poynton, Cate. "Amplification as a grammatical prosody: attitudinal modification in the nominal group." Advances in Discourse Processes 57. 1996: 211–228.
- Poynton, Cate. "Chapter 6: Giving Voice” Counterpoints. Vol. 29, Pedagogy, Technology, and the Body. 1996: 103–112
- Poynton, Cate. "Language, difference and identity: Three perspectives." Literacy and Numeracy Studies 7.1. 1997: 7-24.
- Macarthur, Sally & Cate Poynton (eds). Musics and feminisms. Australian Music Centre. 1999
- Poynton, Cate. "Talking like a girl." Musics and Feminisms. 1999: 119–128.
- Lee, Alison & Cate Poynton (eds). Culture & text: discourse and methodology in social research and cultural studies. Allen & Unwin, 2000
- Poynton, Cate. ‘Linguistics and Discourse Analysis’ in Lee and Poynton 2000: 19–39
- Poynton, Cate, and Alison Lee. "Chapter Two. Debating Appraisal: On Networks and Names". Making a Difference: Challenges for Applied Linguistics (2009): 21.
- Poynton, Cate, and Alison Lee. "Affect-ing discourse: towards an embodied discourse analytics." Social Semiotics 21.5. 2011: 633–644.
- West, Lorraine, Alison Lee, and Cate Poynton. "Becoming depressed at work: A study of worker narratives." Journal of Workplace Behavioral Health 27.3. 2012: 196–212.
- Poynton, Cate. "The privileging of representation and the marginalising of the interpersonal: a metaphor (and more) for contemporary gender relations." Feminine, Masculine and Representation. Routledge, 2020. 231–255.
