= Anne Byrne =

Anne Byrne may refer to:

- Anne Frances Byrne (1775–1837), member of the Water-Colour Society
- Anne Byrne (actress) (born 1943), American actress
- Anne Byrne (Irish folk singer) (1943–2020), Irish singer
- Anne Hamilton-Byrne, leader of The Family, a controversial Australian New Age organization
- Anne-Marie Byrne, Lady Byrne, fictional character in the BBC medical drama Holby City

== See also ==
- Ann Burns (disambiguation)
- Byrne (surname)
