= Entail (disambiguation) =

Entail may refer to:

- Fee tail, a term of art in common law describing a limited form of succession
- Entailment, a logical relation between sentences of a formal language
- Linguistic entailment, the use of the term in linguistics
  - Textual entailment in natural language processing
- In architecture (obsolete), an ornamental device sunk in the ground of stone or brass, and subsequently filled in with marble, mosaic or enamel: see inlay
