= Kees Hengeveld =

Dutch linguist (born 1957)

Prof. Dr. Kees Hengeveld
- Born: Pieter Cornelis Hengeveld; November 20, 1957 (age 68)
- Education: University of Amsterdam
- Website: https://keeshengeveld.nl/

Pieter Cornelis Hengeveld (born November 20, 1957) is a Dutch linguist, professor emeritus of theoretical linguistics at the University of Amsterdam.

He is particularly associated with a layered approach to the analysis of pragmatics, semantics, morphosyntax and phonology, which was incorporated into Simon C. Dik's Functional Grammar and which Hengeveld developed into Functional Discourse Grammar, of which he is considered "the intellectual father". He is a co-editor of the textbook Linguistics.

== Early life and education ==
Hengeveld was born in Wateringen in the Netherlands. After working as a probation officer in Utrecht from 1980 to 1982, he enrolled at the University of Amsterdam in Spanish Language and Literature and in Linguistics, gaining both master's degrees in 1986 cum laude. In 1992 he gained a PhD degree (cum laude) with the thesis Non-verbal predication, with Simon C. Dik as his doctoral supervisor.

== Career ==
Hengeveld was research assistant at the department of general linguistics from 1986 to 1988 at the University of Amsterdam, and then lecturer in Spanish linguistics at the Department of Spanish from 1989 to 1996. In 1996 he was appointed full professor of theoretical linguistics, a position he held until his retirement in 2024. Hengeveld succeeded Simon C. Dik (1940–1995), whose final work, a two-volume presentation of Functional Grammar, he edited and saw through to posthumous publication in 1997.

In 2013, a festschrift was published on the occasion of Hengeveld's 55th birthday. In 2024, a journal issue of Linguistics in Amsterdam was published on the occasion of his retirement.

== Honors ==
Hengeveld was accepted in 2013 to the Royal Holland Society of Sciences and Humanities (KHMW), in 2014 to the Royal Netherlands Academy of Arts and Sciences (KNAW) and in 2019 to the Academia Europaea.

== Organizational work ==
From 2009 to 2014 Hengeveld was director of the Amsterdam Center for Language and Communication. He was chair of the board of the Netherlands Graduate School of Linguistics (LOT) from 2008 to 2009 and director from 2019 to 2022. He was president of the Linguistic Society of the Netherlands in 1995-1996.

He is a member of the editorial boards of Functions of Language and Acta Linguistica Hafniensia. He was consulting editor for Studies in Language until 2013.

== Select publications ==
- Hengeveld, Kees (1989). "Layers and operators in Functional Grammar". Journal of Linguistics. 25 (1): 127–157. doi:10.1017/S0022226700012123.
- Hengeveld, Kees (1992). Non-verbal predication: theory, typology, diachrony. Berlin: Mouton de Gruyter.
- Hengeveld, Kees (1998). "Adverbial clauses in the languages of Europe". In van der Auwera, Johan (ed.). Adverbial constructions in the languages of Europe. Mouton de Gruyter. pp. 335–419.
- Hengeveld, Kees (2004). "The architecture of a Functional Discourse Grammar". In Mackenzie, J. Lachlan; Gómez-González, María Á. (eds.). A new architecture for Functional Grammar. Berlin: Mouton de Gruyter. pp. 1–21.
- Hengeveld, Kees; Mackenzie, J. Lachlan (2008). Functional Discourse Grammar: A typologically-based theory of language structure. Oxford: Oxford University Press.
