= Ann Burns =

Ann Burns may refer to:

- Olive Ann Burns (1924–1990), American writer
- Anne Burns (1915–2001), British aeronautical engineer and glider pilot
- Anne Burns (linguist), British-born Australian educational linguist

== See also ==
- Anne Byrne (disambiguation)
