= Anne Burns (linguist) =

British-born Australian educational linguist

- Born: Wales

Academic background
- Education: University of Wales (BA); Macquarie University (PhD, M.Ed.)

Academic work
- Discipline: Linguist
- Sub-discipline: TESOL
- Institutions: Macquarie University; University of New South Wales

Anne Burns is a British-born Australian educational linguist known for her work on genre-based pedagogy in TESOL and EAP/ESP. She is a Professor Emerita in Language Education at Aston University (UK) and Professor of TESOL at the University of New South Wales (Australia). The TESOL International Association named her one of the '50 at 50', leaders who had made a significant contribution to TESOL in its first 50 years.

== Biography ==
Burns was born and educated in Wales. She received a Bachelor of Arts with Honors in English Literature from the University of Wales in 1966, a PhD from Macquarie University in 1994, and a Master of Education, also from Macquarie University in 1996.

She was formerly the associate director of the National Centre for English Language Teaching and Research (NCELTR), the Commonwealth Government's Key Research Centre for the Adult Migrant English Program (AMEP) (2000–2005). She was also director of the Applied Linguistics and Language in Education (ALLE) Research Centre, Macquarie University (2005–2010), and Dean of Linguistics and Psychology at Macquarie University (2000–2005).

Currently, she holds named chair appointments and distinguished professor appointments at academic institutions in the UK, Australia, and Hong Kong. She has also been a visiting professor in New Zealand, Sweden, Japan, and Thailand. Appointments include Academic Adviser for the Applied Linguistics Series, Oxford University Press (2012–present), chair of the TESOL Research Standing Committee (2009–2012), chair and Editor for the AILA Applied Linguistics Series (AALS) (2014–2016), and Senior Consultant to National Geographic's Cengage.

== Contribution to linguistics ==
Burns has published extensively in the field of TESOL on the teaching of speaking and grammar from a genre/Systemic Functional Linguistics (SFL) perspective. She is internationally known for her pioneering work in action research for language teachers, many of whom have focused on genre-based pedagogy in EAP/ESP.

=== SFL/genre theory ===
Burns's edited book with Caroline Coffin, Analysing English in a Global Context (2001, Routledge), was part of a Masters in Education and Masters in Applied Linguistics Program offered respectively by the Open University (UK) and Macquarie University (Australia). It was adopted by other university programs as a book of readings.

In addition, with Helen Joyce, she adapted the three part Teaching-Learning Cycle (Callaghan and Rothery 1988) to a four part cycle relevant to TESOL (Hammond et al., 1992). With Jenny Hammond and Helen de Silva Joyce, she conducted two national AMEP projects on the teaching of speaking from a genre/SFL perspective in language classrooms.

=== Action research ===
Burns's books Collaborative action Research for English Language Teachers (1999, CUP) and Doing Action Research: A Guide for Practitioners (2010, Routledge) are widely cited in the field of language teacher education. Her work in this area has had a major impact on the growth of the concept of language teacher research. Much of the action research she has conducted with teachers in Australia has included research on genre-based pedagogy/text-based syllabus design, and the applications of SFL in the language classroom.

== Awards and distinctions ==
Since 2010, she has been a consultant through English Australia and Cambridge Assessment English to the English Language Intensive Courses for Overseas Students (ELICOS) sector for their annual Action Research in ELICOS Program. In 2013, this program won an International Education Association of Australia award for best practice/innovation.

In 2019, English Australia established an annual award, The Anne Burns Action Research Grant, to acknowledge an ELICOS institution that has taken up or integrated action research as part of their curriculum or staff professional development program.

== Publications ==
Hammond, J., Burns, A., Joyce, H. Brosnan, D. & Gerot, L. (1992). English for social purposes: A Handbook for Teachers of Adult Literacy. Sydney: National Centre for English Language Teaching and Research.

Burns, A. & de Silva Joyce, H. (1997). Focus on speaking. Sydney: National Centre for English Language Teaching and Research.

Burns, A. (1999). Collaborative action research for English language teachers. New York: Cambridge University Press.

Burns, A. & Coffin, C. (Eds.). (2001). Analysing English in a global context. London: Routledge.

Burns, A. (2010). Doing action research in English language teaching: A guide for practitioners. New York: Routledge.
