= Monika Bednarek =

German-born Australian linguist

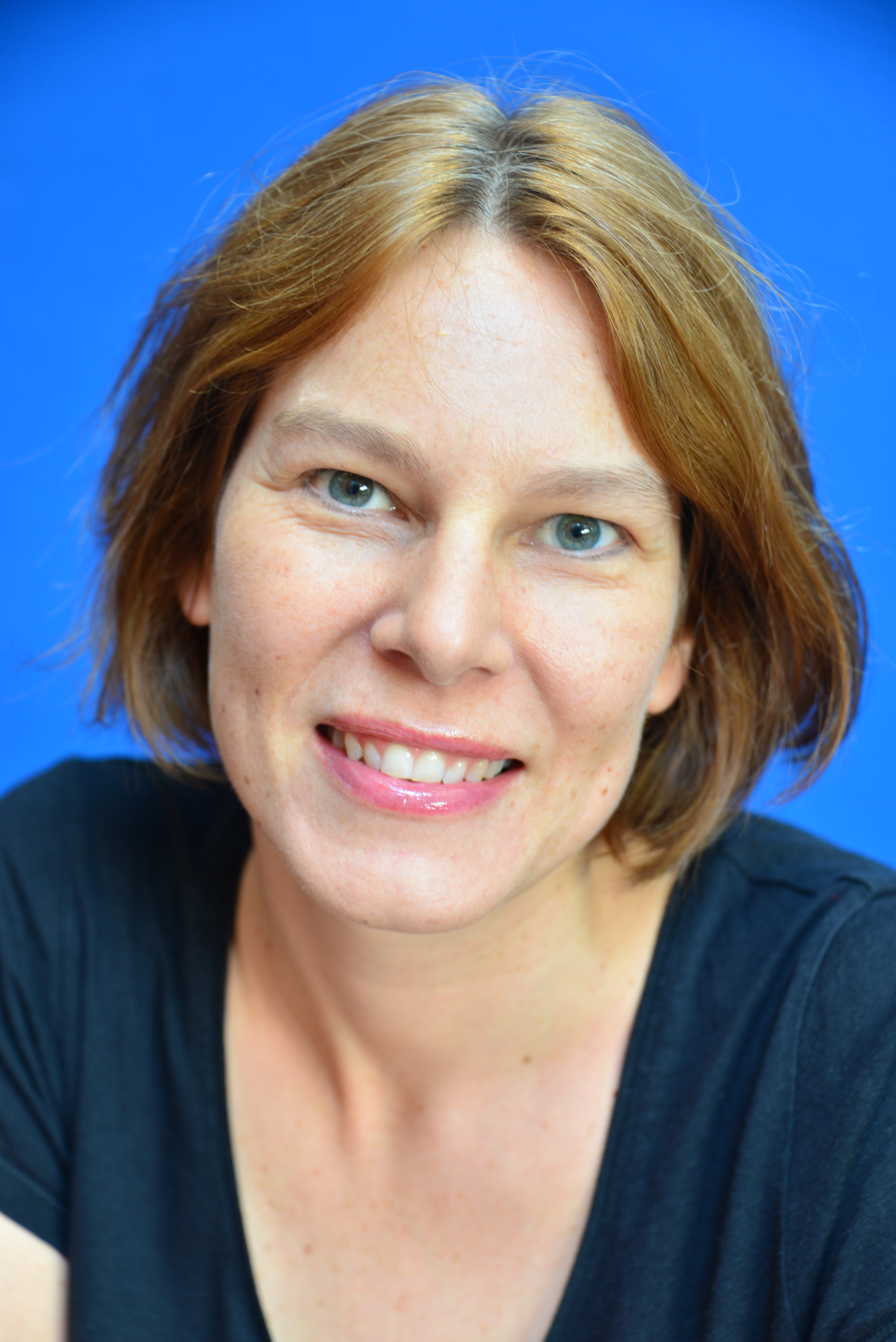
- Born: 1977 (age 48–49)

Academic background
- Education: University of Augsburg (PhD, habilitation)
- Thesis: Evaluating the World. The Evaluative Style of British Broadsheet and Tabloid Publications (2005)
- Doctoral advisor: Wolfram Bublitz; Susan Hunston

Academic work
- Discipline: Linguist
- Sub-discipline: Corpus linguistics
- Institutions: University of Sydney

Monika Bednarek (born 1977) is a German-born Australian linguist. She is a professor in linguistics at the University of Sydney and director of the Sydney Corpus Lab. She is one of the co-developers of Discursive News Values Analysis (DNVA), which is a framework for analyzing how events are constructed as newsworthy through language and images. Her work ranges across various linguistic sub-disciplines, including corpus linguistics, media linguistics, sociolinguistics, discourse analysis, stylistics, and applied linguistics. She was elected a Fellow of the Australian Academy of the Humanities in 2024.

== Biography ==
Bednarek was born and educated in southern Germany. She received her PhD in English Linguistics (summa cum laude) in 2005 from the University of Augsburg under the supervision of Wolfram Bublitz. She received her Habilitation in English linguistics in 2008 from the same university, where she also held her first academic appointment. Since 2009 she has held a continuing position in Linguistics at the University of Sydney.

From 2009 to 2015, Bednarek was book reviews editor of the SAGE journal Discourse and Communication. From 2017 to 2021, she was co-editor, along with Lachlan Mackenzie and Martin Hilpert, of the international journal Functions of Language (John Benjamins).

== Contributions to linguistics ==
Much of Bednarek's research makes a contribution to corpus-based discourse analysis or corpus-assisted discourse studies. Key projects include the analysis of TV series (with a focus on dialogue), news discourse (news values analysis, shared news, and health news), the language of evaluation/emotion, and innovation in research methodologies in corpus linguistics.

=== Television dialogue ===
Bednarek's research on television dialogue has focused on US TV series, with more recent work extending this to Australian series. Contributions include the theorizing of televisual characterization, for example, the concept of 'expressive character identity', a new framework for analysing the functions of dialogue (FATS), and methodological innovation in taking a trinocular view of how language is used in television series, how such language is produced by screenwriters, and how it is consumed in transnational contexts. A new corpus of dialogue from 66 different TV series was compiled for this project. Her work on swear and taboo words in television dialogue has resulted in a novel operationalization and theorization of such words as well as a new taxonomy of relevant linguistic practices.

=== News discourse ===
Early corpus-assisted discourse analysis systematically compared the expression of opinion in British broadsheet and tabloid newspapers. In collaboration with Dr. Helen Caple, Bednarek later created a framework for the discursive analysis of news values, called DNVA. This approach uses corpus and discourse analysis to examine how news values are constructed through semiotic resources (language, image, etc.).

=== Evaluation, emotion, attitude ===
Bednarek has made contributions to the study of language and evaluation/emotion. Her 2006 book, Evaluation in Media Discourse, introduced a parameter-based framework of evaluation, while her 2008 book, Emotion Talk Across Corpora, developed a corpus linguistic approach to the analysis of emotion talk and explored this across British English registers. The book includes a chapter describing a local grammar of affect, evaluated by Susan Hunston as 'probably the most successful' version. Bednarek has also contributed to critiquing and developing research on appraisal, especially in relation to attitude and affect.

== Key publications ==
- Bednarek, M. (2023) Language and Characterisation in Television Series: A Corpus-informed Approach to the Construction of Social Identity in the Media. Amsterdam/Philadelphia: John Benjamins. ISBN 978-9027212955
- Bednarek, M. (2019) Creating Dialogue for TV: Screenwriters Talk Television. London/New York: Routledge. ISBN 978-0367139582
- Bednarek, M. (2018) Language and Television Series. A Linguistic Approach to TV Dialogue. Cambridge: Cambridge University Press. ISBN 978-1108459150
- Bednarek, M. and H. Caple (2017) The Discourse of News Values: How News Organisations Create Newsworthiness. Oxford/New York: Oxford University Press. ISBN 9780190653941
- Bednarek, M. and H. Caple (2012) News Discourse. Continuum Discourse series (edited by Ken Hyland). London/New York: Continuum. ASIN B0865F8ZWV
- Bednarek, M. (2010) The Language of Fictional Television: Drama and Identity. London/New York: Continuum. ISBN 978-1441183668
- Bednarek, M. (2008) Emotion Talk across Corpora. Houndmills/New York: Palgrave Macmillan. ISBN 978-1441183668
- Bednarek, M. (2006) Evaluation in Media Discourse. Analysis of a Newspaper Corpus. London/New York: Continuum. ISBN 9781847142825
