= Stance (linguistics) =

In linguistics, stance is the way in which speakers position themselves in relation to the ongoing interaction, in terms of evaluation, intentionality, epistemology or social relations. When a speaker describes an object in a way that expresses their attitude or relation to the object, the speaker is taking a stance. Stancetaking is viewed as a social action that shares the speaker's view of an object with their audience, sometimes inviting listeners to take their own stance as well.

Different authors have used the concept of stance to refer to the interpretive framework that is at play in an interaction such as irony, or role-playing. Others have used the concept of authorial stance to describe the way in which authors position themselves relative to their own texts, and another group have used the concept of interpersonal stance to describe the way the communicative goals of individual participants shape a communicative interaction. Others have drawn on Daniel Dennett's concept of the intentional stance to describe the way humans tend to impute intentions and mental states to those with whom they engage in communication.

== Uses ==
=== Value ===
Stance can be used to attribute personal value to an object by way of describing how the speaker feels about it. This does not require the speaker to have explicitly said that they are taking a stance. In some cases, stance is only implied through context, and may not even require multiple words.

Sample Conversation:
Speaker	Quote	Stance
A	I like popsicles.	I like popsicles.
B	Me too.	I like popsicles.
C	Ew!	I do not like popsicles.

In this example, each speaker takes a stance with the words that they say, but only Speaker A explicitly demonstrates their stance. Speaker B's stance is implied through the context of Speaker A's quote. When examined by itself, "me too" does not convey Speaker B's stance nor what they are talking about. Speaker C only uses the interjection "ew!" to express disgust, but their stance is still implied given the context.

=== Positioning ===
Speakers can use stance to define their relation to an object without having to assign it value.

Sample Conversation:
Speaker	Quote	Stance
A	It says here that cheetahs are the fastest land mammal.	(none)
B	Yeah, I know.	I know that cheetahs are the fastest land mammal.
C	Oh, really?	I do not know that cheetahs are the fastest land mammal.

In the above case, the speakers do not make known their opinions about the topic. However, Speakers B and C are still taking a stance because they present information that shows their relation to the object.

=== Interactional stances ===
In conversation analysis, stance is used to express various nuances of action or an overlay to an action. Three types of stance are often distinguished: Epistemic stance is the expression (through verbal or other means) of a relative difference between interactants' relation to some knowledge (i.e. a doctor has the epistemic authority to answer medical questions), while deontic stance is the expression of relative strength compared to another interactant to make decisions, such as requesting or requiring that someone performs a certain task. The display of affect or emotion, such as towards an answer to a question as negative or positive, or when reacting to something in a story, is often considered an affective stance. Conversation analysis often treats the stance of one turn as making another display of a stance relevant, and reacting appropriately to a display of stance (such as matching the emotion) is said to achieve affiliation between the interactants. Phonetic and prosodic features of turns are examples of linguistic features that can be used to encode an interactional stance.

== See also ==
- Appraisal (discourse analysis)
- Stance detection
