= Willie Brady =

- Born: William Brady; 15 July 1930; Dún Laoghaire, County Dublin, Ireland
- Died: 27 March 1969 (aged 38)
- Occupation: Singer
- Relatives: Anne Byrne (Niece)

Willie Brady (15 July 1930 – 27 March 1969) was an Irish ballad and country singer and recording artist, popular in Ireland and abroad in the 1950s and 1960s. He was singing and recording ballads before the "Ballad Boom" arrived in Ireland and recorded over 20 albums. He died at the age of 38.

== Life ==
Brady was born in Dún Laoghaire to a theatrical family.

He made his broadcasting debut with Radio Éireann in 1950. He went on to become a regular on shows such as Take the Floor and Ranch-house Revels.

In the late 1950s, he signed for Irish-American recording company Avoca Records, with which he recorded his first two albums: Songs from Erin's Green Shore and The Homes of Donegal & Other Irish Ballads. In the following years his popularity increased in Britain and the US and he continued to tour and record albums.

In 1968, he was diagnosed with a kidney ailment which required a transplant. He died the following year, leaving a wife and four young children.

Brady was the uncle of Anne Byrne, a folk-singer who came to prominence in the 1960s with The Abbey Tavern musicians in Howth, County Dublin.
