= J. R. Martin =

Canadian linguist

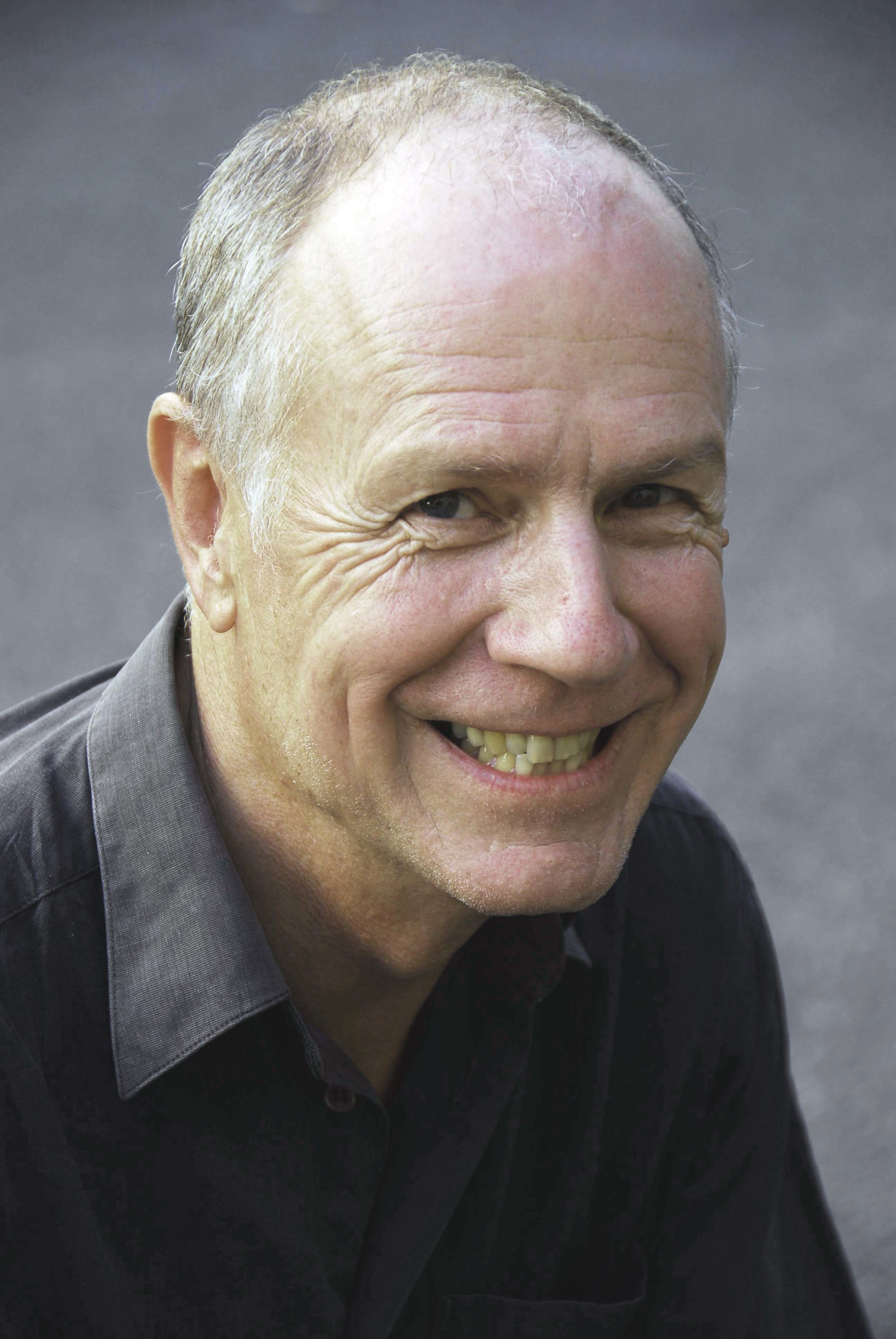
- Born: 1950 (age 75–76)
- Known for: Discourse semantics, genre, appraisal
- Scientific career
- Fields: Linguistics
- Workplaces: University of Sydney

James Robert Martin (born 1950) is a Canadian linguist. He is Professor of Linguistics (Personal Chair) at The University of Sydney. He is the leading figure in the 'Sydney School' of systemic functional linguistics. Martin is well known for his work on discourse analysis, genre, appraisal, multimodality and educational linguistics.

== Biography ==
Jim Martin was born in Canada in 1950. He studied linguistics with Michael Gregory and Waldemar Gutwinski at York University (Glendon College), with H.A. Gleason and Peter Reich at the University of Toronto, and with Michael Halliday and Ruqaiya Hasan at the University of Essex, UK. In 1977, Halliday invited him to the newly founded Linguistics Department at the University of Sydney, where he has been based ever since.

Martin was elected fellow of the Australian Academy of the Humanities in 1998, and awarded a Centenary Medal for his services to Linguistics and Philology in 2001.

His research interests include systemic functional linguistics, systemic functional grammar, discourse semantics, register, genre, multimodality and critical discourse analysis, focusing on English and Tagalog - with special reference to the transdisciplinary fields of educational linguistics, forensic linguistics and social semiotics.

His books include a major description of discourse semantics, English Text, an outline of appraisal theory with Peter White, The Language of Evaluation; and with David Rose, a guide to discourse analysis, Working with Discourse, a guide to genre theory, Genre Relations: mapping culture, and an introduction to the genre-based literacy pedagogy of the ‘Sydney School’, Learning to Write, Reading to Learn. The first 2 of 8 volumes of his collected papers were published in 2010.

== Contributions to linguistics ==
Major contributions by Jim Martin to linguistic theory and practice include discourse semantics, genre, appraisal and the educational linguistics of the Sydney School.

Discourse semantic theory (set out in English Text, Working with Discourse and The Language of Evaluation) describes the organisation of texts with respect to the three metafunctions of language - interpersonal, ideational and textual. Interpersonal discourse systems include NEGOTIATION, by which speakers enact exchanges in dialogue, and APPRAISAL, by which speakers and writers negotiate their attitudes. Ideational systems include IDEATION, by which they construe their experience as activities involving people and things, and CONJUNCTION, which connects events and organises texts in logical sequences. Textual systems include IDENTIFICATION, by which the identities of people, things and places are introduced and tracked through discourse, and PERIODICITY, which organises discourse in waves of information at the scales of the text, phase (paragraph) and clause. In developing discourse semantic theory, Martin was particularly influenced by H.A. Gleason's stratificational linguistics, Ruqaiya Hasan's text semantics, and Michael Halliday's systemic functional linguistics.

The genre theory of the Sydney School describes genres as 'staged, goal-oriented social processes'. In functional linguistics terms they are defined as a recurrent configuration of meanings, that enact the social practices of a culture. Genres are related and distinguished by recurrent global patterns, such as sequences in time, complicating events, explaining processes, describing things, or arguing for a point of view. They are also distinguished by recurrent local patterns, such as the narrative stages Orientation^Complication^Resolution, or the exposition stages Thesis^Arguments^Reiteration. Martin's work on genre initially emerged from educational research from 1979, describing the types of texts that students are expected to write in school. It has since been expanded by many scholars to map genres across a range of cultural contexts, and is the starting point for analysis of texts and design of literacy education interventions. In addition to the textbook Genre Relations, a brief introduction is given in Rose 2012

Martin's key contribution to educational linguistics is the genre-based approach to language education. Genre pedagogy is based on a principle of 'guidance through interaction in the context of shared experience', influenced by research in child language development by Michael Halliday and Clare Painter. In practice, teachers guide students to deconstruct the organisation and language features of model texts, and then jointly construct new texts in the same genre, using the text organisation and language features identified in the deconstruction. Sydney School research in genre and discourse semantics outlined above is a foundation of the pedagogy, and associated teacher training programs. Genre pedagogy is now institutionalised in school syllabi across Australia and Indonesia, and is increasingly applied internationally. In addition to the textbook Learning to Write, Reading to Learn, a brief introduction is given in Rose 2010.

More recently Martin has been working in the field of multimodality, focusing on children’s picture books. A jointly authored book, with Clare Painter and Len Unsworth is in press. He has also begun work in forensic linguistics, working with Paul Dwyer and Michele Zappavigna on restorative justice, youth justice conferencing in particular. A collection of their papers is in preparation as Volume 8 of his Collected Works. Martin has also been involved in recent years in interdisciplinary works with Karl Maton's Legitimation Code Theory.

== See also ==
- Sydney School (linguistics)
- Metafunction
- Michael Halliday
- Ruqaiya Hasan
- systemic functional linguistics
- systemic functional grammar
