= Natalie Matosin =

Australian scientist researching stress

Natalie Matosin is an Australian scientist known for research into the human brain in health and disease, and particularly stress and its role in mental illness. Matosin's research has been published in academic journals, as well as on The Conversation. Matosin spoke at TEDx Hamburg in June 2017 and was the 2021 Al & Val Rosenstrauss Fellow. She was previously a National Health and Medical Research Council CJ Martin Early Career Research Fellow, an International Brain Research Organization Research Fellow, and Alexander von Humboldt Fellow. In 2017, Matosin was listed as a Forbes 30 Under 30 in Europe in the category of Science & Healthcare, placing her in the top 1% of innovators worldwide. Her work has been recognised by the 2024 A.W. Campbell Medal from the Australasian Neuroscience Society, the 2025 Aubrey Lewis Award from Biological Psychiatry Australia, and as a Finalist for the 2026 Eureka Prize for Emerging Leader in Science, Technology and Engineering. In 2026, Matosin was elected to the Australian Academy of Science National Committee for Brain and Mind.

== Early life and education ==
Matosin was interested in science and curing the world of disease from an early age and went on to study a Bachelor of Medical Science (Honours, Class 1) at the University of Wollongong. Matosin was awarded a PhD in neurobiology from the University of Wollongong with a thesis "Exploring mGluR5 dysregulation in schizophrenia: from gene to protein". She went on to hold a postdoctoral position at University of New South Wales. In 2023, the University of Wollongong awarded Matosin the Young Alumni Award, recognising outstanding graduates aged 35 or younger who have made exceptional professional strides and demonstrated early-career leadership.

== Career and research ==
Matosin currently works as a Sydney Horizon Fellow and Senior Lecturer at the University of Sydney. She previously worked at the University of New South Wales, the University of Wollongong and the Max Planck Institute of Psychiatry in Germany. The focus of Matosin's research has been on the physical and chemical clues that remain in brain tissue following the effects of stress over a lifetime. Matosin analyses human brain specimens to pinpoint differences in the brains of those diagnosed with brain disorders compared to the brains of healthy donors, as these form targets for new and improved brain medicines.

Matosin was working in Germany during the arrival of large numbers of Syrian refugees, and her research now includes collaboration with the NSW Service for the Treatment and Rehabilitation of Torture and Trauma Survivors. Together they study the impact of trauma on refugee populations in the Sydney community, examining its impact on the body's physiology at a molecular level and its relationship to mental illness.

== Publication ==
Her most cited articles are:

- Natalie Matosin, Thorhildur Halldorsdottir, Elisabeth B Binder. "Understanding the molecular mechanisms underpinning gene by environment interactions in psychiatric disorders: the FKBP5 model." Biological Psychiatry (2018) 83 (10), 821-830
- Natalie Matosin, Cristiana Cruceanu , Elisabeth B Binder . Preclinical and Clinical Evidence of DNA Methylation Changes in Response to Trauma and Chronic Stress. Chronic Stress (2017) 1

Publications from her independent research group include:

- Dominic Kaul, Sybille G Schwab, Naguib Mechawar, Lezanne Ooi, Natalie Matosin "Alterations in Astrocytic Regulation of Excitation and Inhibition by Stress Exposure and in Severe Psychopathology". Journal of Neuroscience (2022) 42 (36), 6823-6834
- Dominic Kaul, Sybille G Schwab, Naguib Mechawar, Natalie Matosin "How Stress Physically Re-shapes the Brain: Impact on Brain Cell Shapes, Numbers and Connections in Psychiatric Disorders". Neuroscience and Biobehavioural Reviews (2021) 124, 193-215
- Rachael Bartlett, Zoltan Sarnyai, Shakeh Momartin, Lezanne Ooi, Sibylle G Schwab, Natalie Matosin. Understanding the pathology of psychiatric disorders in refugees. Psychiatry Research (2021) 296, 113661
- Dominic Kaul, Caine C Smith, Julia Stevens, Anna S Fröhlich, Elisabeth B Binder, Naguib Mechawar, Sibylle G Schwab, Natalie Matosin. Severe childhood and adulthood stress associates with neocortical layer-specific reductions of mature spines in psychiatric disorders. Neurobiology of Stress (2020) 13, 100270

== Recognition and awards ==
- 2026 Finalist, University of Sydney Eureka Prize for Emerging Leader in Science, Technology and Engineering, Eureka Prizes
- 2025 Aubrey Lewis Award from Biological Psychiatry Australia
- 2024 A.W. Campbell Medal from the Australasian Neuroscience Society,
- 2023 Young Alumni Award, University of Wollongong.
- 2021 Al & Val Rosenstrauss Fellowship from the Rebecca L Cooper Medical Research Foundation.
- 2020 Brain Sciences Award from the Rebecca L Cooper Medical Research Foundation.
- 2020 Rebecca L Cooper Memorial Award from the Rebecca L Cooper Medical Research Foundation.
- 2020 World Congress of Psychiatric Genetics Award.
- 2019 NSW Tall Poppy Science Award from the Australian Institute of Policy and Science.
- 2019 Dame Bridget Ogilvie Career Advancement Scholarship.
- 2017 place on Forbes 30 Under 30 list in the category Europe - Science & Healthcare.
- 2017 Alies Muskin Career Development Award, Anxiety and Depression Association of America.
- 2017 ACNP Travel Award, American College of Neuropsychopharmacology.
- 2016 NHMRC CJ Martin Early Career Fellowship, Australian National Health and Medical Research Council.
- 2015 Humboldt Research Fellow, Alexander Von Humboldt Foundation.
- 2013 Company of Biologists Travelling Fellowship.
- 2012 Ian Scott Scholarship from Australian Rotary Health.
