= Functions of Language =

- Discipline: Linguistics
- Language: English
- Edited by: Martin Hilpert, J. Lachlan Mackenzie, Monika Bednarek

Publication details
- History: 1994–present
- Publisher: John Benjamins (Netherlands)
- Frequency: Triannual
- Impact factor: 0.417 (2012)

Standard abbreviations
- ISO 4: Funct. Lang.

Indexing
- ISSN: 0929-998X (print); 1569-9765 (web)
- OCLC no.: 50141045

Links
- Journal homepage

Functions of Language is a peer-reviewed academic journal that covers the field of linguistics treated from a functional perspective. It has been published by John Benjamins since 1994. The current editors in chief are Martin Hilpert (University of Neuchâtel), J. Lachlan Mackenzie (Free University Amsterdam), and Monika Bednarek (University of Sydney).
