= Paul Baker (linguist) =

British linguist

- Born: 23 May 1972 (age 54); Lancaster, United Kingdom
- Known for: Corpus linguistics; Corpus-assisted discourse studies; Critical discourse analysis; Language and identity
- Awards: Fellow of the Royal Society (2017)

Academic background
- Education: Lancaster University
- Thesis: Polari - The Lost Language of Gay Men

Academic work
- Discipline: Linguist
- Sub-discipline: Corpus linguistics; Corpus-assisted discourse studies; Polari
- Institutions: Lancaster University
- Website: Baker on the website of Lancaster University

Paul Baker (born 1972) is a British professor and linguist at the Department of Language and Communcation at Hong Kong Polytechnic University. His research focuses on corpus linguistics, critical discourse analysis, corpus-assisted discourse studies and language and identity. He is known for his research on the language of Polari. He is a Fellow of the Academy of Social Sciences and a Fellow of the Royal Society for Arts.

== Career ==
On 8 November 2003, Scott Simon interviewed Baker on the language of Polari on the National Public Radio.

Since its creation in 2006, Baker has been the commissioning editor of the journal Corpora.

On 24 May 2010, Baker's article, Polari, a vibrant language born out of prejudice, was published in The Guardian on the language of Polari. Baker said that "I love Polari, but hopefully, the narrow-minded social conditions that led to its creation will never require anything like it to happen in this country again."

In an article, published on 27 July 2017 on BBC, Paul Baker said that "Layering upon layering of different influences ensures that there is no one single version of Polari but many versions and Polari has its own vocabulary for elements that mainstream society is not interested in."

On 6 November 2017, Baker was accepted as a Fellow of the Royal Society for the encouragement of Arts, Manufactures and Commerce (RSA).

In 2018, he received a staff award for work on the language of Polari and its contribution to uncovering and highlighting LGBT heritage.

In July 2019, he gave a speech about bias in the press at the British Parliament at the launch of the Centre for Media Monitoring.

In March 2025, he gave a Darwin College lecture at the University of Cambridge, entitled Polari: A very queer code.

== Research ==
His PhD thesis was published in a book entitled Polari: The Lost Language of Gay Men (2002). A later book, Fabulosa (2019) updated the research for a non-academic audience. Baker regularly runs workshops in Polari at the Bishopsgate Institute, London.

His research focuses on corpus linguistics, language and identity, and critical discourse analysis.

A Polari exhibition at the John Rylands Library, Manchester used Paul Baker's research. The Polari Mission was a multi-disciplinary collaboration between artists and specialists in the fields of linguistics and computer science including Baker and Tim Greening-Jackson. The aim was to raise awareness about Polari, one of the world’s most endangered languages, a bold yet secretive part of Gay history.

In 2017, Baker's research on change in British and American English was reported in The Telegraph and The Guardian. Baker noted how gradable adverbs like quite, rather and fairly have dramatically decreased in British English over the period 1931-2006, a phenomenon which seems to follow American English, which is more advanced.

In 2019, Baker's research on patient feedback on the National Health Service was reported in Independent.

== Works ==
=== Articles ===
Baker has published over 30 articles in journals such as Discourse and Society, Journal of English Linguistics, Language Learning and Technology, Journal of Language and Politics, and Applied Linguistics. These include:

- Baker, P. (2004). "Querying keywords: questions of difference, frequency and sense in keywords analysis". Journal of English Linguistics. 32 (4): 346–359. doi:10.1177/0075424204269894. S2CID 15055536.
- Baker, P.; Gabrielatos, C.; Khosravinik, M.; Krzyżanowski, M.; McEnery, T.; Wodak, R. (2008). "A useful methodological synergy? Combining critical discourse analysis and corpus linguistics to examine discourses of refugees and asylum seekers in the UK press". Discourse and Society. 19 (3): 273–306. doi:10.1177/0957926508088962. S2CID 121893.
- Gabrielatos, C.; Baker, P. (2008). "Fleeing, sneaking, flooding: a corpus analysis of discursive constructions of refugees and asylum seekers in the UK Press 1996-2005". Journal of English Linguistics. 36 (1): 5–38. doi:10.1177/0075424207311247.
- Baker, P. (2016). "The shapes of collocation". International Journal of Corpus Linguistics. 21 (2): 139–164. doi:10.1075/ijcl.21.2.01bak.

=== Books ===
- Baker, P. (2002). Polari: The Lost Language of Gay Men. London: Routledge.
- Baker, P. (2002). Fantabulosa: A Dictionary of Polari and Gay Slang. London: Continuum.
- Baker, P.; Stanley, J. (2003). Hello Sailor! Seafaring life for gay men: 1945-1990. London: Pearson.
- Baker, P. (2005). Public Discourses of Gay Men. London: Routledge.
- Baker, P.; Hardie, A.; McEnery, A. (2006). A Glossary of Corpus Linguistics. Edinburgh: Edinburgh University Press.
- Baker, P. (2006). Using Corpora in Discourse Analysis. London: Continuum.
- Baker, P. (2008). Sexed Texts: Language, Gender and Sexuality. London: Equinox.
- Baker, P., ed. (2009). Contemporary Corpus Linguistics. London: Continuum.
- Baker, P. (2010). Sociolinguistics and Corpus Linguistics. Edinburgh: Edinburgh University Press.
- Baker, P.; Ellece, S. (2011). Key Terms in Discourse Analysis. London: Continuum.
- Baker, P.; Gabrielatos, C.; McEnery, T. (2013). Discourse Analysis and Media Attitudes: The Representation of Islam in the British Press. Cambridge: Cambridge University Press.
- Baker, P. (2014). Using Corpora to Analyse Gender. London: Bloomsbury.
- Baker, P.; McEnery, T., eds. (2015). Corpora and Discourse: Integrating Discourse and Corpora. London: Palgrave.
- Baker, P.; Egbert, J., eds. (2016). Triangulating Methodological Approaches in Corpus-Linguistic Research. London: Routledge.
- Baker, P.; Balirano, G., eds. (2017). Queering Masculinities in Language and Culture. London: Palgrave.
- Baker, P. (2017). American and British English. Divided by a Common Language?. Cambridge: Cambridge University Press.
- Baker, P.; Brookes, G.; Evans, C. (2019). The Language of Patient Feedback: A corpus linguistic study of online health communication. London: Routledge.
- Baker, P. (2019). Fabulosa! The Story of Polari, Britain's Secret Gay Language. London: Reaktion.
- Egbert, J.; Baker, P., eds. (2019). Triangulating Corpus Methodological Approaches in Linguistic Research. London: Routledge.
- Baker, P.; Vessey, R.; McEnery, T. (2021). The Language of Violent Jihad. Cambridge: Cambridge University Press.
- Brookes, G.; Baker, P. (2021). Obesity in the News: Language and Representation in the Press. Cambridge: Cambridge University Press.
- Baker, P. (2022). Outrageous! The Story of Section 28 and Britain's Battle for LGBT Education. London: Reaktion.
- Baker, P. (2023). Camp! The Story of the Attitude That Conquered the World. Great Britain: Footnotes Ltd.
