= Simon C. Dik =

Dutch linguist (1940–1995)

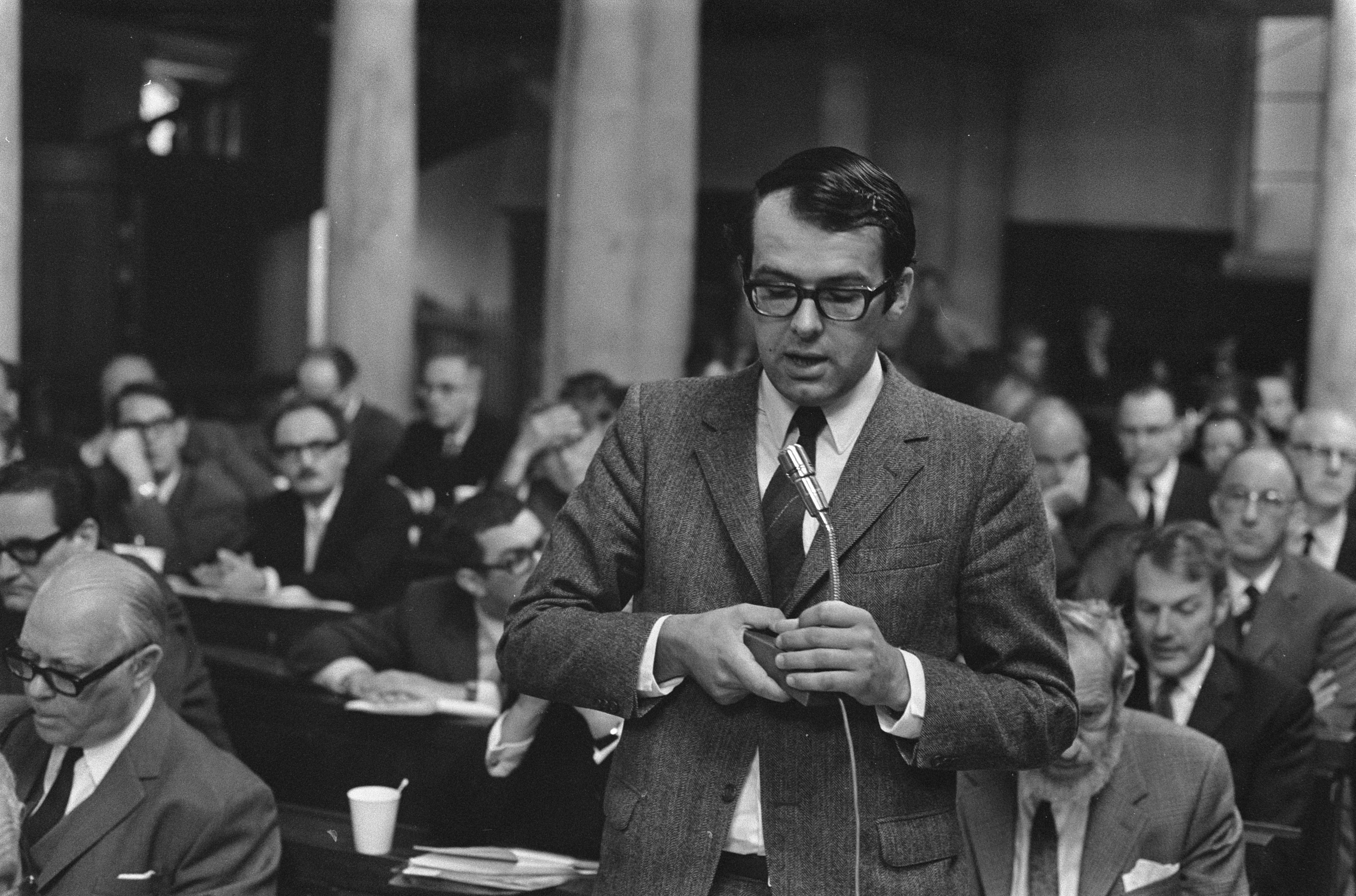
S.C. Dik (1970)

Simon Cornelis Dik (September 6, 1940 in Delden – March 1, 1995 in Holysloot) was a Dutch linguist, most famous for developing the theory of functional grammar. He occupied the chair of General Linguistics at University of Amsterdam between 1969 and 1994. During these 25 years he developed the theory of functional grammar, the foundations for which had been laid in his 1968 dissertation on coordination.

Two years before his death, Dik fell ill. As much as his illness allowed, he worked on developing his theory until his death. The second part of his work, The Theory of Functional Grammar, was published posthumously in 1997.

== Career ==
Simon Dik took a degree in classical language. His PhD dissertation was done under the supervision of Anton Reichling, and after it he became chair of general linguistics in Amsterdam at only 28 years old, which was a point of discussion. During the 70s and 80s he worked on formulating his theory of functional grammar, including various discussions with proponents of generative grammar which formed a big part of linguistics departments in the Netherlands. He was the supervisor of Kees Hengeveld who then became his closest collaborator, and helped part II of The theory of functional grammar materialize as Dik fell ill in 1992.

Dik was elected a member of the Royal Netherlands Academy of Arts and Sciences in 1986.

== Selected publications ==
- The Theory of Functional Grammar (Part I: The Structure of the clause), 1989 ISBN 90-6765-432-9
- The Theory of Functional Grammar (Part II: Complex and Derived Constructions), 1997 ISBN 3-11-015404-8 (pt. I); ISBN 3-11-015403-X (pt. I paperback); ISBN 3-11-015406-4 (pt. II); ISBN 3-11-015405-6 (pt. II paperback)
