= Beverly Derewianka =

Australian linguist

Beverly Derewianka (born 1946) is Emeritus Professor of linguistics at the University of Wollongong, Australia. She is a leading figure in educational linguistics and Sydney School genre pedagogy. Her major research contributions have been in the field of literacy education. Her research projects tracing students’ literacy development have had a direct and substantial impact on curriculum and syllabus development in Australia and internationally. She has (co-)authored 11 books and numerous book chapters and journal articles in the field of literacy education.

== Biography ==
Beverly Derewianka completed a Bachelor of Arts in 1967 at the University of Sydney. She received her Master of Arts (with merit) at the same university in 1975. In 1996, she completed her Doctor of Philosophy at Macquarie University.

Before joining the University of Wollongong (UOW) as a research officer in 1985, Beverly Derewianka accumulated extensive professional experience in language education in secondary schools. She taught English, Italian and modern languages in a number of schools and institutions including Petersham Girls High School, NSW Department of Education, Gregorian University in Rome, Correspondence School, St. George Technical College and Domremy Secondary Girls College during 1969 to 1983. She also worked as a teaching consultant of languages for the NSW Department of Education in 1984.

Derewianka was admitted as an Emeritus Professor at UOW in 2017.

== Major contributions ==
Beverly Derewianka's extensive professional and academic experience enables her to "successfully negotiate the different areas of research and policy and practice, earning the endorsement of teachers, academics and policy-makers alike". She has participated in literacy policy and curriculum development in Australia and in many other countries and regions. She worked on the Australian Curriculum for English and acted as Research Consultant and Project Director to a major project at Hong Kong University. She has been a consultant internationally on syllabus design and implementation, for example to educational authorities in Singapore, New Zealand and the European Union.

Her research projects have had a direct and profound impact on curriculum and syllabus development in Australia and internationally. In Australia, the findings have provided important references to inform policy development at different levels of school in the Australian National Curriculum. Internationally, her research has influenced syllabus design in countries including Singapore, Hong Kong, the USA, and England.

Over her career, Derewianka has attracted over $5 million in funding for various projects. Major projects include four Australian Research Council grants and an Economic and Social Research Council (UK) grant. One grant from the Department of Education, Science and Technology in 2008 was the largest grant received by UOW at the time. It involved a collaboration among four universities in planning and delivering a week-long summer school for 250 teachers.

Derewianka has published research on topics such grammar description, language teaching and assessment and genre-based pedagogy. Reviewed in The Australian Journal of Linguistics (14 September 2011), her co-authored book with Professor Frances Christie, School Discourse – based on findings from our ARC Discovery project – was described as ‘an invaluable resource for teachers of primary and secondary students’ and is the best-selling monograph of the series. Her professional publications (reference books for literacy educators) have sold around 140,000 copies internationally and have been translated into Swedish and Danish.

She has received several important awards for her achievements in educational linguistics and literacy, including the Nicoll Award for Best Teacher Education Publication and the Australian Literacy Educators' Association Citation of Merit Award for distinguished contribution to literacy education in Australia. She was granted a Life Membership of the Primary English Teaching Association of Australia in 2012.

== Selected publications ==
- Derewianka, B. & Myhill, D. (2017 in preparation) Issues in Developing a Contemporary Pedagogic Grammar
- Derewianka, B. & Jones, P. (2016) Teaching Language in Context (2nd Edition – expanded with new material and chapters) Melbourne: Oxford University Press
- Derewianka, B. (2016) Good Teaching: Literacy, Series of handbooks commissioned by the Department of Education, Tasmania
- Derewianka, B. (2015) Genre-specific Indicators of Achievement (Research Report commissioned by the Australian Curriculum and Reporting Authority)
- Derewianka, B. & Jones, P. (2012) Teaching Language in Context, Melbourne: Oxford University Press
- Derewianka, B. (2011) A New Grammar Companion. Newtown, Sydney: elit Press
- Christie, F. & Derewianka, B. (2008) School Discourse: Learning to Write across the Years of Schooling London: Continuum Press
- Derewianka, B. (1998) A Grammar Companion for Primary Teachers, Sydney: PETA/Heinemann
- Derewianka, B. (1996) Exploring the Writing of Genres, UK: United Kingdom Reading Association monograph
- Derewianka, B., (ed.) (1991) Language Assessment in the Primary Classroom, Sydney: Harcourt Brace Jovanovich
- Derewianka, B. (1990) Exploring How Texts Work, Sydney: PETA
