= Michele Zappavigna =

Australian linguist and researcher

- Born: Sydney, New South Wales, Australia

Academic background
- Education: University of Sydney (PhD)
- Thesis: Eliciting Tacit Knowledge with a Grammar-targeted Interview Method

Academic work
- Discipline: Linguist
- Institutions: University of New South Wales

Michele Zappavigna is an Australian linguist. She is an associate professor at the University of New South Wales, Sydney. Her major contributions are based on the discourse of social media and ambient affiliation (how people bond online). Her work is interdisciplinary and covers studies in systemic functional linguistics (SFL), corpus linguistics, multimodality, social media, online discourse and social semiotics. Zappavigna is the author of six books and numerous journal articles covering these disciplines.

== Biography ==
Zappavigna was born in 1978 and educated in Sydney, Australia. She received her PhD in Information Systems from the University of Sydney in 2007. A book based on her PhD research was published in 2013, titled Tacit Knowledge and Spoken Discourse. From 2008 to 2012, Zappavigna was an Australian Research Council (ARC) Postdoctoral Fellow at the Department of Linguistics, University of Sydney. She worked on the ARC project Enacting Reconciliation: Negotiating meaning in Youth Justice Conferencing, a research project that analysed Youth Justice Conferencing in Australia from the perspectives of functional linguistics and performance studies with J.R. Martin and Paul Dwyer. A book based on this research project, Discourse and Diversionary Justice: An Analysis of Ceremonial Redress in Youth Justice Conferencing, with J.R. Martin, was published in 2018.

In 2013, Zappavigna was appointed a lecturer in the School of the Arts and Media at the University of New South Wales. Since 2016, Zappavigna has been a Senior Lecturer in the School of the Arts and Media, University of New South Wales.

== Contributions to Linguistics ==
Major contributions by Zappavigna include work based on the discourse of Twitter, ambient affiliation and social semiotic multimodal approaches to social photography.

=== Discourse of Twitter and Ambient Affiliation ===
Zappavigna has published widely on the discourse of Twitter and has made major contributions to research on 'ambient affiliation' - how people bond online. Her journal article published in New Media & Society in 2011, "Ambient affiliation: a linguistic perspective on Twitter", has been widely cited and is the first example of a systemic functional linguistics approach being applied to the discourse of Twitter and the use of the hashtag as a linguistic marker, making language "searchable". Zappavigna's 2012 book, Discourse of Twitter and Social Media: How We Use Language to Create Affiliation on the Web, expands upon the concept of "ambient affiliation" introduced in her 2011 journal article and, as a review by Rachelle Vessey states, "ultimately it presents new and innovative ways of approaching the discourse of Twitter, a type of data that had yet to be examined from a linguistic perspective". Zappavigna has also co-authored a book with Ruth Page, David Barton, Johann Wolfgang Unger, Researching Language and Social Media, that makes a contribution regarding different linguistic approaches to the analysis of social media.

In 2018, Zappavigna published another book on the discourse of Twitter, with a focus on the functional contexts of hashtags: Searchable Talk: Hashtags and Social Media Metadiscourse. This book makes a major contribution to the study of hashtags as evaluative markers and expands upon Zappavigna's work on ambient affiliation. A review by Mark McGlashan writes that "not only does this monograph flesh out Zappavigna's SFL-based approach to the examination of social media communication, it provides the most comprehensive account of hashtags from a social semiotic/SFL perspective that I am aware of, and will be of interest to researchers and research students alike".

=== Social Photography ===
Zappavigna has contributed to studies regarding social photography and the selfie. In collaboration with Sumin Zhao from the University of Edinburgh, she has developed a new social semiotic multimodal framework for interpreting the selfie. This involves interpreting the selfie in terms of "intersubjectivity" and classifying the selfie according to five sub-types: presented, mirrored, inferred, implied and still life. This framework has been applied to a diverse range of topics including selfies in mommyblogging, digital scrapbooks, decluttering vlogs on YouTube, and cyclist Instagram posts.

== Key Publications ==
Ngo, T., Hood, S., Martin, J. R., Painter, C., Smith, B., & Zappavigna, M. (in preparation). Modelling Paralanguage Using Systemic Functional Semiotics: Theory and Application. London: Bloomsbury.

Zappavigna, M. (2018). Searchable Talk: Hashtags and Social Media Metadiscourse. London: Bloomsbury.

Zappavigna, M., & Martin, J.R. (2018). Discourse and Diversionary Justice: An Analysis of Ceremonial Redress in Youth Justice Conferencing. London: Palgrave.

Page, R., Unger, J., Barton, D. & Zappavigna, M. (2014). Researching Language and Social Media. London: Routledge.

Zappavigna, M. (2013). Tacit Knowledge and Spoken Discourse. London: Bloomsbury.

Zappavigna, M. (2012). Discourse of Twitter and Social Media. London, Continuum.
