= Jenny Hammond =

Australian linguist

Jenny Hammond is an Australian linguist. She is known for her research on literacy development, classroom interaction, and socio-cultural and systemic functional theories of language and learning in English as an Additional Language or dialect (EAL/D) education. Over the course of her career, Hammond's research has had a significant impact on the literacy development of first and second language learners, on the role of classroom talk in constructing curriculum knowledge and on policy developments for EAL education in Australia. She is an Honorary Associate Professor in the School of Education, University of Technology Sydney.

== Education ==
Hammond received her Bachelor of Arts degree from the University of Sydney in 1971. She then completed a Diploma of Education at the Sydney Teacher's College in 1972. Hammond's initial interest in literacy and EAL education was shaped by her experience of living in Italy and teaching English as a second language. In 1977, she moved back to Australia and worked as an English as a Second Language teacher. She also became interested in linguistics, and studied for an Applied Linguistics master's degree at the University of Sydney, graduating in 1983.

== Career ==
Hammond taught for many years in language and literacy education and English as an Additional Language (EAL) education and research design. She worked as a lecturer in Language Education at the University of Wollongong and Macquarie University. She completed her PhD in linguistics from the University of Sydney in 1995. The title of her thesis was "The Grammatical Construction of Literacy: An Analysis of two primary school literacy programs". From 1995 to 2008, she was appointed an associate professor in Language and Literacy, in the Faculty of Education, University of Technology Sydney. From 2008 onwards, she has held an Honorary Associate Professorship at the University of Technology Sydney, and continues to work as an active researcher and writer.

== Contributions to literacy and curriculum knowledge in EAL/D education ==
Hammond's research draws upon multiple theoretical approaches to learning, e.g. between Vygotsky's theories of learning, Alexander's notion of dialogic talk, and the notion of scaffolding in language and literacy education. This research has impacted national policy development in relation to literacy development and curriculum knowledge in EAL/D education in Australia.

=== Literacy Development ===
While at Macquarie University, Hammond coordinated a large action research project with Adult Migrant English teachers in NSW and Queensland. The book English for Social Purposes, published in 1992 and based on this research, is still widely used in adult literacy contexts, and was praised for its accessibility and usefulness in the Adult Migrant English Program. Hammond was also the co-author of the national Adult Migrant English Program Literacy Strategy and a principal writer of the report Pedagogical Relations between Adult ESL and Adult Literacy. The report was described as a 'major development' in the field of English literacy in a ministerial reference to the National Board of Employment, Education and Training (NBEET).

A commissioned paper, written with Beverly Derewianka, on ESL Education for The Project of National Significance on the Preservice Preparation of Teachers for Teaching English Literacy has been widely used in ESL programs in universities in Victoria, NSW and Queensland. Another paper co-authored by Hammond and Derewianka for Prospect: A Journal of Australian TESOL has also been widely used and quoted.

Her work is cited in influential books on the field of ESL and EAL including Gibbons' Bridging Discourses in the ESL Classroom: Students, Teachers and Researchers and Exploring Literacies by de Silva Joyce and Feez.

=== Policy Developments for EAL Education in Australia ===
Hammond's research has been highly influential in the development of national literacy policy for Australian schools, especially in relation to EAL/D.

Two Australian Research Council funded projects, Putting Scaffolding to Work in Language and Literacy Education: New Perspectives in ESL Education (with Pauline Gibbons and Mary Macken-Horarik), and Challenging Pedagogies: Engaging ESL students in intellectual quality, with their emphasis on key principles of high challenge and high support, and their articulation of designed-in and contingent scaffolding, and message abundancy, have informed NSW Department of Education policy in English as an Additional Language (EAL) Education. In total about 400 EAL and class teachers in primary and secondary schools participated in these year-long intensive professional development programs. The outcomes of this research, and the model of research that Hammond and her colleagues worked with in these projects (of collaboration and input from groups of researchers, consultants and teachers) directly informed the EAL Pedagogy Project that was implemented by the Department of Education over a period of 10 years.

Building on the principles and outcomes of these two ARC projects, the NSW Department of Education engaged Hammond in further research, this time focusing specifically on the needs of students from refugee backgrounds, funding two further projects: Transition of Refugee Students and Classrooms of Possibility. A series of videos emanating from the work in these projects were also launched by the Department of Education, for use by educational consultants, academics, lead teachers, and for professional development programs supporting teachers who are working with recently arrived EAL and refugee students in mainstream classes, as well as an edited collection.

== Recognition ==
Hammond has been selected as a keynote speaker by the Australian Council of TESOL Associations and Australian Council for Adult Literacy, and as a plenary speaker by the Symposium on Second Language Writing. She was a featured speaker in Language Magazine's "Conversations with Experts in Multilingualism".

== Selected publications ==
- Jones, P., & Hammond, J. (Eds.). (2019). Talking to Learn. London & New York, Routledge.
- Hammond, J. (2018) Mainstreaming of recently arrived immigrant and refugee school students: An Australian perspective. Nordic Journal Paideia
- Hammond, J. (2018) Classrooms of Possibility: Working with students of refugee background in mainstream classes. Final report. NSW Department of Education.
- Hammond, J., Cootes, K., Hayes, A. & Valdez-Adams, C. (2018) Talking to Learn and Learning to talk: EAL students in the mainstream. In P. Jones, A. Simpson & A. Thwaites (eds): Talking the Talk: snapshots from Australian Classrooms. Sydney, Primary English Teaching Association Australia. (pp49–62)
- Hammond, J. (2017) Literate Talk: Supporting EAL students’ academic writing. In J. Bitchener, N. Storch & R. Wette (eds) Teaching Writing for Academic Purposes to Multilingual Students. New York, Routledge. (pp115–129).
- Hammond, J. (2016). Dialogic space: Intersections between dialogic teaching and systemic functional linguistics. Research Papers in Education, 31(1), 5-22.
- Hammond, J. (2014). An Australian perspective on standards‐based education, teacher knowledge, and students of English as an additional language. TESOL Quarterly, 48(3), 507–532.
- Hammond, J. (2006). High challenge, high support: Integrating language and content instruction for diverse learners in an English literature classroom. Journal of English for Academic Purposes, 5(4), 269–283.
- Hammond, J. (2001). Scaffolding: Teaching and learning in language and literacy education. Sydney, Primary English Teaching Association
- Hammond, J., & Macken-Horarik, M. (2001). Teachers' voices, teachers' practices: Insider perspectives on literacy education. The Australian Journal of Language and Literacy, 24(2), 112.
- Hammond, J., & Macken-Horarik, M. (1999). Critical literacy: Challenges and questions for ESL classrooms. TESOL Quarterly, 33(3), 528–544.
