= Thomas Spohr =

- Education: Bachelor of Law (Honours), Bachelor of Arts
- Alma mater: University of Wollongong
- Occupation: Barrister
- Employer: Samuel Griffith Chambers
- Board member of: Tristan Jepson Memorial Foundation, Law Society of New South Wales

Thomas Spohr is an Australian barrister, former solicitor advocate with NSW Legal Aid and former prosecutor.

He is a former appointed councillor of the Law Society of New South Wales (representing NSW Young Lawyers), and was President of NSW Young Lawyers in 2014. Spohr was a board member of the Tristan Jepson Memorial Foundation, (now known as Minds Count) and a member of the Legal Profession Admission Board Legal Qualifications Committee, which is charged with accrediting law degrees in New South Wales. He was the chair of the New South Wales Young Lawyers Criminal Law Committee for over three years and Treasurer of NSW Young Lawyers in 2011.

== Education ==
Spohr obtained his law degree from the University of Wollongong, graduating in Arts and Law (with Honours) in 2006.

== Career ==
Spohr was a prosecutor at the Office of the Director of Public Prosecutions (New South Wales), then briefly at the Commonwealth DPP, before joining NSW Legal Aid in 2016. He has been involved in widely reported cases, including the $45.3 million fraud by Rajina Subramaniam (said to be one of the largest by an individual in Australia's history), the prosecution of Katherine Abdallah for the murder of her cousin, Suzie Sarkis, and the appeal by Carnita Matthews against her conviction for a traffic offence allegedly committed whilst wearing a burqa. Spohr worked in private practice at one stage, appearing for Andrew Jones, a person of interest in the high-profile coronial inquiry into the disappearance of Janine Vaughan. He now practices at the private criminal Bar out of Samuel Griffiths Chambers.

== Public references to works ==
Spohr writes and comments regularly on law reform issues, and has been cited by authorities including the New South Wales Law Reform Commission in its Interim report on standard minimum non-parole periods, and in New South Wales Parliament. He has been critical of government policy, for example an article titled "Mandatory Sentencing: It Ought To Be Passed In At The Law And Order Auction”, in response to New South Wales legislation targeting alcohol-related violence, and in an interview for Kill Your Darlings on the same topic.
