= Anne Byrne (Irish folk singer) =

Irish singer (1943–2020)

- Born: 1943; Dun Laoghaire, County Dublin, Ireland
- Died: December 28, 2020 (aged 76–77)
- Occupation: Singer
- Years active: 1960s–1980
- Relatives: Willie Brady (maternal uncle)
- Website: annebyrne.com

Anne Byrne (1943 – 28 December 2020) was a noted Irish folk singer active in the 1960s and 1970s.

== Early life ==
Byrne was born in Dún Laoghaire. She was the niece of Willie Brady, an Irish ballad and country singer who was popular in Ireland and abroad in the 1950s and 1960s.

== Career ==
Byrne became one of the few female voices in the Irish folk revival of the 1960s and 70s. Her voice was described as "a classic 'folk' voice, pure, full, and melodic." "Anne Byrne's voice floats clearly, lyrically, over the skilled guitar playing of Paddy Roche and MIck Crotty," wrote an American reviewer in 1972, when her album I Chose the Green was re-released in the United States by Capitol Records, as part of their "International Series".

After winning prizes for singing at the 1967 Father Mathew Feis (Feis an t-Athair Maitiú) in Dublin, she performed on several TV programmes in Eire. She also sang at a benefit concert in 1967, raising funds for St. Raphael's School for Mentally Handicapped Boys, in Celbridge.

Byrne toured both North America and Europe. She performed at the Newport Folk Festival and at the 1970 Philadelphia Folk Festival. She performed in many of Ireland's most noted folk venues including The Abbey Tavern in Howth, The Embankment in Tallaght, the Stardust in Artane, and the Coffee Kitchen and O'Donoghue's in Dublin. She performed with, amongst others, the Dubliners and The Chieftains. She recorded four albums. She retired from singing professionally in 1980.

Byrne married fellow musician Patrick Roche in 1966, and had three children, Patrick, Jason, and Oisin. She died in 2020, in her seventies.

== Albums ==
Byrne also appears on The Rafters Ring at the Abbey Tavern (Pye Productions 1965), a recording of various artists' live performances at the popular Howth venue.

- Jesse Owens And Anne Byrne With Seamus Gallagher (Waverley 1966)
- I Chose The Green (Waverley 1967, Capitol Records 1972)
- Anne Byrne Sings Irish (Hawk 1973; with Paddy Roche)
- Come By The Hills (Hawk 1974)
