= Lezanne Ooi =

Australian neuroscientist and academic

- Education: University of Leeds; University of York
- Known for: Neuroscience
- Scientific career
- Workplaces: University of Wollongong; University of Leeds
- Thesis: An analysis of repressor element 1- silencing transcription factor interactions with its target genes (2005)

Lezanne Ooi is an Australian neuroscientist who is Professor and Head of Neurodevelopment at the University of Wollongong. Her research considers the development of cellular imaging techniques to understand neurodegenerative disease.

== Early life and education ==
Ooi trained in the United Kingdom. She studied biochemistry at the University of York, where she worked with GlaxoSmith Kline. When Ooi was studying neuroscience, her grandmother was diagnosed with dementia, which motivated her to purse a career studying neurodegenerative disease. She completed her doctoral research on the transcriptional repressor REST (Repressor Element 1-Silencing Transcription factor) at the University of Leeds. She remained there as a postdoctoral researcher, where she studied cardiac hypertrophy and developed cellular imaging techniques to understand neuronal function. Her research showed that atrial natriuretic peptide (ANP) and B-type natriuretic peptide (BNP) became abnormally high in people with hypertrophy, and that an increase in REST could halt the rise of the other proteins.

== Research and career ==
In 2012, Ooi joined the University of Wollongong as a professor of neuroscience. Her lab has characterised over 100 induced pluripotent stem cell lines. She has studied various neurological conditions, including motor neuron diseases and vanishing white matter disease, a form of leukodystrophy. She studied how COVID-19 impacted the likelihood of contracting dementia.

In 2022, Ooi was awarded funding from the Michael J. Fox Foundation to study Parkinson's disease. Her research considers the neuronal changes that place during neurodegenerative disease. She believes that Parkinson's causes changes in cell lipids and metabolites; which could be used as biomarkers of disease.

== Selected publications ==
- G. D. Smith; M. J. Gunthorpe; R. E. Kelsell; et al. (23 June 2002). "TRPV3 is a temperature-sensitive vanilloid receptor-like protein". Nature. 418 (6894): 186–190. doi:10.1038/nature00894. ISSN 1476-4687. PMID 12077606. Wikidata Q40723123.
- Lezanne Ooi; Ian C Wood (July 2007). "Chromatin crosstalk in development and disease: lessons from REST". Nature Reviews Genetics. 8 (7): 544–54. doi:10.1038/nrg2100. ISSN 1471-0056. PMID 17572692. Wikidata Q28306534.
- Chiara Zuccato; Nikolai Belyaev; Paola Conforti; et al. (1 June 2007). "Widespread disruption of repressor element-1 silencing transcription factor/neuron-restrictive silencer factor occupancy at its target genes in Huntington's disease". The Journal of Neuroscience. 27 (26): 6972–6983. doi:10.1523/jneurosci.4278-06.2007. ISSN 0270-6474. PMC 6672230. PMID 17596446. Wikidata Q39333674.
