= Textual entailment =

Concept in natural language processing

In natural language processing, textual entailment (TE), also known as natural language inference (NLI), is a directional relation between text fragments. The relation holds whenever the truth of one text fragment follows from another text.

== Definition ==
In the TE framework, the entailing and entailed texts are termed text (t) and hypothesis (h), respectively. Textual entailment is not the same as pure logical entailment – it has a more relaxed definition: "t entails h" (t ⇒ h) if, typically, a human reading t would infer that h is most likely true. (Alternatively: t ⇒ h if and only if, typically, a human reading t would be justified in inferring the proposition expressed by h from the proposition expressed by t.) The relation is directional because even if "t entails h", the reverse "h entails t" is much less certain.

Determining whether this relationship holds is an informal task, one which sometimes overlaps with the formal tasks of formal semantics (satisfying a strict condition will usually imply satisfaction of a less strict conditioned); additionally, textual entailment partially subsumes word entailment.

== Examples ==
Textual entailment can be illustrated with examples of three different relations:

An example of a positive TE (text entails hypothesis) is:

- text: If you help the needy, God will reward you.

hypothesis: Giving money to a poor man has good consequences.

An example of a negative TE (text contradicts hypothesis) is:

- text: If you help the needy, God will reward you.

hypothesis: Giving money to a poor man has no consequences.

An example of a non-TE (text does not entail nor contradict) is:

- text: If you help the needy, God will reward you.

hypothesis: Giving money to a poor man will make you a better person.

== Ambiguity of natural language ==
A characteristic of natural language is that there are many different ways to state what one wants to say: several meanings can be contained in a single text and the same meaning can be expressed by different texts. This variability of semantic expression can be seen as the dual problem of language ambiguity. Together, they result in a many-to-many mapping between language expressions and meanings. The task of paraphrasing involves recognizing when two texts have the same meaning and creating a similar or shorter text that conveys almost the same information. Textual entailment is similar but weakens the relationship to be unidirectional. Mathematical solutions to establish textual entailment can be based on the directional property of this relation, by making a comparison between some directional similarities of the texts involved.

== Approaches ==
Textual entailment measures natural language understanding as it asks for a semantic interpretation of the text, and due to its generality remains an active area of research. Many approaches and refinements of approaches have been considered, such as word embedding, logical models, graphical models, rule systems, contextual focusing, and machine learning. Practical or large-scale solutions avoid these complex methods and instead use only surface syntax or lexical relationships, but are correspondingly less accurate. As of 2005, state-of-the-art systems are far from human performance; a study found humans to agree on the dataset 95.25% of the time. Algorithms from 2016 had not yet achieved 90%.

== Applications ==
Many natural language processing applications, like question answering, information extraction, summarization, multi-document summarization, and evaluation of machine translation systems, need to recognize that a particular target meaning can be inferred from different text variants. Typically entailment is used as part of a larger system, for example in a prediction system to filter out trivial or obvious predictions. Textual entailment also has applications in adversarial stylometry, which has the objective of removing textual style without changing the overall meaning of communication.

== Datasets ==
Some of available English NLI datasets include:

- SNLI
- MultiNLI
- SciTail
- SICK
- MedNLI
- QA-NLI

In addition, there are several non-English NLI datasets, as follows:

- XNLI
- DACCORD, RTE3-FR, SICK-FR for French
- FarsTail for Farsi
- OCNLI for Chinese
- SICK-NL for Dutch
- IndoNLI for Indonesian

== See also ==
- Entailment (linguistics)
- Inference engine
- Semantic reasoner
- Fuzzy logic
- Stance detection

== Bibliography ==
- Potthast, Martin; Hagen, Matthias; Stein, Benno (2016). Author Obfuscation: Attacking the State of the Art in Authorship Verification (PDF). Conference and Labs of the Evaluation Forum.
