= Sydney School (linguistics) =

- Founder: Michael Halliday
- Established: 1979 at the Working Conference on Language in Education held at the University of Sydney
- Focus: Genre-based literacy pedagogy
- Key people: J. R. Martin, David Rose

The Sydney School is a genre-based writing pedagogy that analyses literacy levels of students. The Sydney School's pedagogy broadened the traditional observation-based writing in primary schools to encompass a spectrum of different genres of text types that are appropriate to various discourses and include fiction and non-fiction. The method and practice of teaching established by the Sydney School encourages corrective and supportive feedback in the education of writing practices for students, particularly regarding second language students. The Sydney School is intended to reflectively institutionalise a pedagogy that is established to be conducive to students of lower socio-economic backgrounds, indigenous students and migrants lacking strong English literacy. The functional linguists who designed the genre-based pedagogy of the Sydney School did so from a semantic perspective to teach through patterns of meaning and emphasised the importance of the acquisition of a holistic literacy in various text types or genres. 'Sydney School' is not an entirely accurate name, as the pedagogy evolved beyond metropolitan Sydney universities to being adopted nationally and, by 2000, was exported to centres in Hong Kong, Singapore, and parts of Britain.

== Background ==
The Sydney School is a genre-based literacy pedagogy that began developing in August 1979 at the Working Conference on Language in Education. This conference, organised by Michael Halliday, is noted by J. R. Martin as being the place at which ideas about genre analysis as a lens to observe the way students are taught to write in primary and secondary school were formed. The significant developments of the Sydney School throughout the 1980s were based upon the assessment of primary schools’ treatment of genre in education, consisting of a removed approach that was focused primarily upon recount and observation-based writing. It was not until 1995 when the NSW Board of Studies designed their new English K-6 syllabus that the theories of the Sydney School began to make an impact on pedagogy. The title 'Sydney School' was given to the body of research however became quickly outdated as the study began to extend nationally. By 2000 the Sydney School had firmly become attained international reach.

== Notable influencers and researchers ==
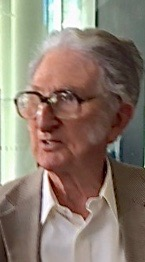
Michael Halliday, influencer of the pedagogy of the Sydney School, at his 90th birthday symposium, 2015.

=== Michael Halliday ===
Michael Alexander Kirkwood Halliday founded the Department of Linguistics at the University of Sydney in 1976. Before establishing the Sydney Linguistics department Emeritus Professor Michael Halliday held chairs at the University of London, the University of Illinois and the University of Essex. Eventually Professor Halliday gained worldwide recognition as founder of the theory of systemic functional linguistics. His inception of systemic functional linguistics was galvanised by his linguistic research in English which led to his theories on cohesion, lexicogrammar and prosodic phonology. This theory serves as the basis for the Sydney School. Michael Halliday organised the Working Conference on Language in Education at the University of Sydney which is cited as being where the work that resulted in development of the Sydney School first got underway.

=== Basil Bernstein ===
The development Sydney School was influenced by the sociological theory of Basil Bernstein. Bernstein's theoretical discussion of the sociology of education involving social class having distinct effects upon students' success or failure within the education system especially influenced J. R. Martin's early work within the Sydney School. Bernstein refers to this as being a battle about pedagogy and curriculum between old and new middle class. Bernstein identifies these classes as representing traditional and progressive pedagogy respectively.

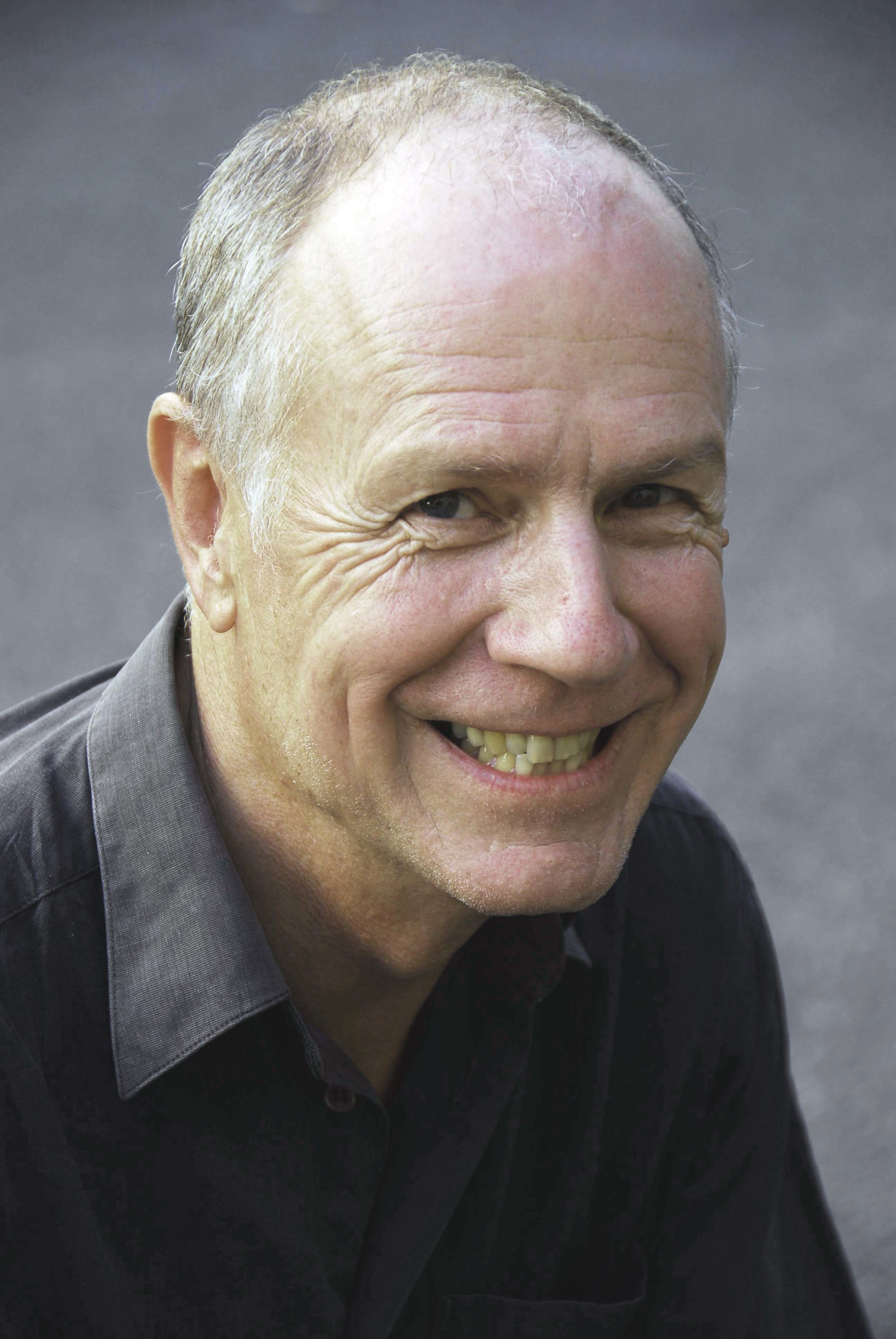
A photo of Professor J. R. Martin, linguist and professor at the University of Sydney.

=== J. R. Martin ===
James Robert Martin is one of the primary contributors to the Sydney School. In 1979 Martin began lecturing in the Faculty of Applied Linguistics in conjunction with the Faculty of Education at the University of Sydney. Professor Martin made significant contributions to linguistic theory and practice, which includes discourse semantics, genre, and appraisal. Martin was in attendance at the Working Conference on Language in Education which he describes as being the beginning of the Sydney School's development.

=== David Rose ===
David Rose is a significant researcher within the Sydney School and emphasises interdisciplinary approaches to language education. Rose is currently the Director of the Reading to Learn Literacy program which has become renowned globally and aims to guide teacher's pedagogical practices in classrooms. In Rose's early career as an academic and researcher he studied the Pitjantjatjara Aboriginal language and identified this indigenous language as having more resemblance to Latin than to English, particularly in their suffixes and that descriptive categories. Rose worked in South African classrooms and through this research into the educational practices he noted the impact of colonialism on South African students. Rose emphasises that in order to build a democratic post-apartheid South Africa improving pedagogical practices and therefore democratising the classroom is pivotal. He proffers that classroom democracy can be enhanced through successful literacy pedagogy that engages students and promotes high levels of literacy. This is the goal of the Sydney School's pedagogy, particularly its emphasis on supportive feedback and dialogue between student and teacher.

== Genre in the Sydney School ==
The Sydney School characterises genres as staged goal-oriented social processes. J. R. Martin describes that, "As functional linguists we interpreted genres from a semantic perspective as patterns of meaning." The action research undertaken by the Sydney School led to innovations in teaching practices associated with the development of writing. Research into the understanding of teaching pedagogy uncovered limitations in practice. Initially, emphasis was given only to a writing in the form of a recount text type. This mode of writing had a narrow focus and was restrictive of what could be produced by a student within the recount constraint. The Sydney School was developed primarily around a need to extend education into other genres in order to properly encompass a holistic education of writing. The Sydney School extends study beyond the recount text type to include imaginative narratives, expository and explanatory writing, report styles, descriptive writing, persuasive texts and discursive pieces.

The Sydney School takes into consideration the types of genre that were necessary to incorporate into syllabi and the point at which pupils should be exposed to these genres within their education. This analysis of genre as a means to develop the ways in which writing is taught in school provided teachers with metalanguage or explicit terminology with which to refer to genres and their staging.

== Application of the Sydney School ==
In the early 1990s this application of writing pedagogy extended to incorporate reading literacy and was applied in high school education and eventually, later in the decade, expanded to encompass tertiary levels of study. Sydney School's theory has permeated international pedagogy including ESL classrooms, the implications of which have been uncovered by Sunny Hyon. Hyon discerns the Sydney School as being different to the writing pedagogy of English for specific purposes and others owing to its emphasis on primary and high school learning rather than tertiary education. Hyon finds the Sydney School to be effective in its provision of instructional frameworks for teachers as well as the connections made between the formal and functional aspects of writing genres, the importance of which is emphasised by Professor Vijay Kumar Bhatia.

Paul Dufficy identifies an issue of genre-based pedagogy's practical application in multilingual classrooms and describes the style of learning as lending itself to an establishment of a hierarchy in learning and limiting interactions. Dufficy emphasises the importance of interaction and the child asking questions rather than the teacher as is present within genre-based pedagogy. Dufficy describes this as being limiting to the thought purposes of the child and presents that children from a multi-language background may not be as responsive to this system of questioning and answering as it is not culturally appropriate to them. Dufficy aligns scaffolding in genre-based pedagogy with that of a building and through this analogy states that initially scaffolding is created with the goal of removing it after its development to reveal a building, or a child's learning and progression, however this model may not be applicable in multi-language classrooms. A 2001 article by Karen Dooley investigated the application of genre-based study in ESL classrooms and analyses that it is effective in its teaching of cognitive academic language proficiency (CALP). Dooley identifies flaws having a genre-based pedagogy of ESL students and concurs with statements made by Dufficy about the sacrifice of responding to students in favour of teachers adopting a predominantly instructional role.

Devo Devrim describes the opportunities for learning supplied within the feedback emphasised pedagogy of the Sydney School as being richer than that of the feedback in the Second Language Acquisition (SLA) and Second Language Writing (L2W) pedagogies. SLA and L2W are characterised as being "corrective" whereas the Sydney School emphasises a supportive dialogue between the student and pedagogue.
