= Appraisal (discourse analysis) =

How writers or speakers express approval or disapproval

In Systemic Functional Linguistics (SFL), appraisal refers to the ways that writers or speakers express approval or disapproval for things, people, behaviour or ideas. Language users build relationships with their interlocutors by expressing such positions. In other approaches in linguistics (including linguistic anthropology, sociolinguistics, corpus linguistics), alternative terms such as evaluation or stance are preferred.

J.R. Martin and P.R.R. White's approach to appraisal regionalised the concept into three interacting domains: 'attitude', 'engagement' and 'graduation'. Each of these has various sub-systems; for example, 'attitude' includes 'affect' (expression of emotion), 'appreciation' (evaluation of things/entities), and 'judgement' (evaluation of people and their behaviour), with different choices within these sub-systems. In the case of 'affect', for instance, these more delicate choices relate to different types of emotion. However, there is debate about the different sub-systems that should be recognised, and various researchers have since suggested modifications of the initial description.

The analysis of appraisal has also become influential outside Systemic Functional Linguistics, in various types of discourse analysis.
