= Lists of schools =

The following are lists of schools:

- Lists of schools by country
- List of art schools
- List of boarding schools
- List of choir schools
- List of Christian Brothers schools
- List of democratic schools
- List of fictional schools
- List of forestry technical schools
- List of high schools producing multiple Olympic gold medalists
- List of hoshū jugyō kō (supplementary weekend Japanese schools)
- List of information schools
- List of library science schools
- List of medical schools
- List of Ministry of Foreign Affairs of Russia overseas schools
- List of Mofet schools
- List of Montessori schools
- List of music schools
- List of the oldest schools in the world
- List of pharmacy schools
- List of philosophy schools
- List of political schools
- List of schools for the deaf
- List of schools for quantitative psychology
- List of schools of international relations
- List of social work schools
- List of Sudbury schools
- List of summer schools of linguistics
- Lists of universities and colleges
- List of virtual schools

== See also ==
- Category:Schools of thought
- Category:Lists of educational organizations
