= Linguistics =

Scientific study of language

Linguistics is the scientific study of language. Specific areas of linguistic description and analysis are syntax (rules governing the structure of sentences), semantics (meaning), morphology (structure of words), phonetics (speech sounds and equivalent manual gestures in sign languages), phonology (the abstract sound system of a particular language, and analogous systems of sign languages), and pragmatics (how the context of use contributes to meaning). Subdisciplines such as biolinguistics (the study of the biological variables and evolution of language) and psycholinguistics (the study of psychological factors in human language) bridge many of these divisions.

These various branches and subfields span both theoretical and practical applications. Theoretical linguistics is concerned with explaining the universal and fundamental nature of language and developing a general framework for describing it. Applied linguistics seeks to use the findings of the scientific study of language for practical purposes, such as developing methods of improving language education and literacy. Mathematical linguistics is the application of mathematics to model phenomena and solve problems in general linguistics and theoretical linguistics. Computational linguistics is an interdisciplinary field concerned with the computational modelling of natural language, as well as the study of appropriate computational approaches to linguistic questions.

Linguistic features may be studied through a variety of perspectives: synchronically (by describing the structure of a language at a specific point in time) or diachronically (through the historical development of a language over a period of time), in monolinguals or in multilinguals, among children or among adults, in terms of how it is being learnt or acquired, as abstract objects or as cognitive structures, through written texts or through oral elicitation, and finally through mechanical data collection or practical fieldwork.

Linguistics emerged from the field of philology, of which some branches are more qualitative and holistic in approach. Today, philology and linguistics are variably described as related fields, subdisciplines, or separate fields of language study. But, by and large, linguistics can be seen as an umbrella term. Linguistics is also related to the philosophy of language, stylistics, rhetoric, semiotics, lexicography, and translation.

== Major subdisciplines ==
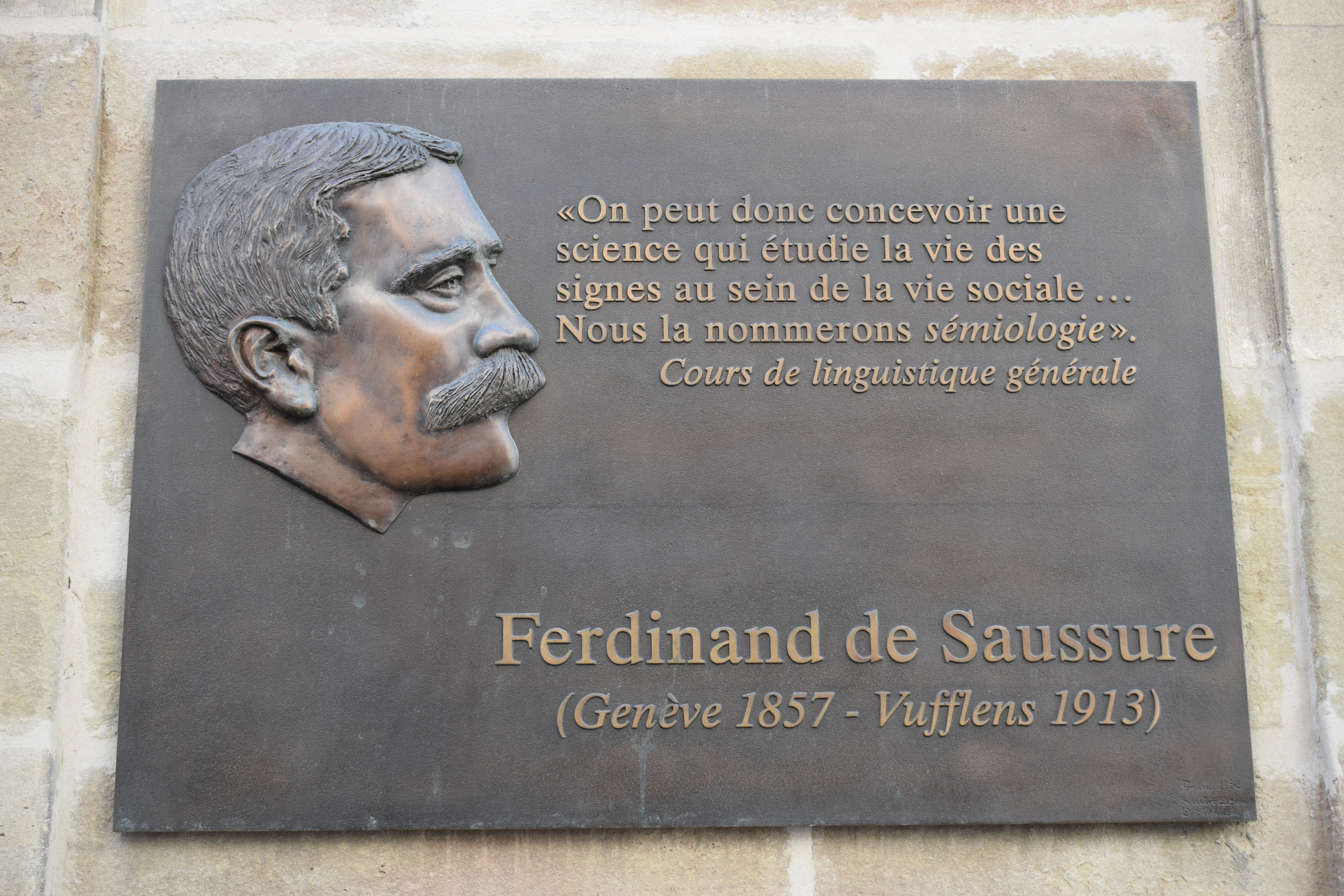
Swiss linguist Ferdinand de Saussure is regarded as the creator of semiotics.

=== Historical linguistics ===
Historical linguistics is the study of how language changes over history, particularly with regard to a specific language or a group of languages. Western trends in historical linguistics date back to roughly the late 18th century, when the discipline grew out of philology, the study of ancient texts and oral traditions.

Historical linguistics emerged as one of the first few sub-disciplines in the field, and was most widely practised during the late 19th century. Despite a shift in focus in the 20th century towards formalism and generative grammar, which studies the universal properties of language, historical research today still remains a significant field of linguistic inquiry. Subfields of the discipline include language change and grammaticalization.

Historical linguistics studies language change either diachronically (through a comparison of different time periods in the past and present) or in a synchronic manner (by observing developments between different variations that exist within the current linguistic stage of a language).

At first, historical linguistics was the cornerstone of comparative linguistics, which involves the study of the relationship between different languages. At that time, scholars of historical linguistics were only concerned with creating different categories of language families, and reconstructing prehistoric proto-languages by using both the comparative method and the method of internal reconstruction. Internal reconstruction is the method by which an element that contains a certain meaning is re-used in different contexts or environments where there is a variation in either sound or analogy.

The reason for this had been to describe well-known Indo-European languages, many of which had detailed documentation and long written histories. Scholars of historical linguistics also studied Uralic languages, another European language family for which very little written material existed back then. After that, there also followed significant work on the corpora of other languages, such as the Austronesian languages and the Native American language families.

In historical work, the uniformitarian principle is generally the underlying working hypothesis, occasionally also clearly expressed. The principle was expressed early by William Dwight Whitney, who considered it imperative, a "must", of historical linguistics to "look to find the same principle operative also in the very outset of that [language] history."

The above approach of comparativism in linguistics is now, however, only a small part of the much broader discipline called historical linguistics. The comparative study of specific Indo-European languages is considered a highly specialized field today, while comparative research is carried out over the subsequent internal developments in a language: in particular, over the development of modern standard varieties of languages, and over the development of a language from its standardized form to its varieties.

For instance, some scholars also tried to establish super-families, linking, for example, Indo-European, Uralic, and other language families to a hypothetical Nostratic language group. These attempts are still not widely accepted as credible methods. A limit of around 10,000 years is often assumed for the functional purpose of conducting research. It is also hard to date various proto-languages. Even though several methods are available, these languages can be dated only approximately.

In modern historical linguistics, we examine how languages change over time, focusing on the relationships between dialects within a specific period. This includes studying morphological, syntactical, and phonetic shifts. Connections between dialects in the past and present are also explored.

=== Syntax ===
Syntax is the study of how words and morphemes combine to form larger units such as phrases and sentences. Central concerns of syntax include word order, grammatical relations, constituency, agreement, the nature of crosslinguistic variation, and the relationship between form and meaning. There are numerous approaches to syntax that differ in their central assumptions and goals.

=== Morphology ===
Morphology is the study of words, including the principles by which they are formed, and how they relate to one another within a language. Most approaches to morphology investigate the structure of words in terms of morphemes, which are the smallest units in a language with some independent meaning. Morphemes include roots that can exist as words by themselves, but also categories such as affixes that can only appear as part of a larger word. For example, in English the root catch and the suffix -ing are both morphemes; catch may appear as its own word, or it may be combined with -ing to form the new word catching. Morphology also analyzes how words behave as parts of speech, and how they may be inflected to express grammatical categories including number, tense, and aspect. Concepts such as productivity are concerned with how speakers create words in specific contexts, which evolves over the history of a language.

The discipline that deals specifically with the sound changes occurring within morphemes is morphophonology.

=== Semantics and pragmatics ===
Semantics and pragmatics are branches of linguistics concerned with meaning. These subfields have traditionally been divided according to aspects of meaning: "semantics" refers to grammatical and lexical meanings, while "pragmatics" is concerned with meaning in context. Within linguistics, the subfield of formal semantics studies the denotations of sentences and how they are composed from the meanings of their constituent expressions. Formal semantics draws heavily on philosophy of language and uses formal tools from logic and computer science. On the other hand, cognitive semantics explains linguistic meaning via aspects of general cognition, drawing on ideas from cognitive science such as prototype theory.

Pragmatics focuses on phenomena such as speech acts, implicature, and talk in interaction. Unlike semantics, which examines meaning that is conventional or "coded" in a given language, pragmatics studies how the transmission of meaning depends not only on the structural and linguistic knowledge (grammar, lexicon, etc.) of the speaker and listener, but also on the context of the utterance, any pre-existing knowledge about those involved, the inferred intent of the speaker, and other factors.

=== Phonetics and phonology ===
Phonetics and phonology are branches of linguistics concerned with sounds (or the equivalent aspects of sign languages). Phonetics is largely concerned with the physical aspects of sounds such as their articulation, acoustics, production, and perception. Phonology is concerned with the linguistic abstractions and categorizations of sounds, and it tells us what sounds are in a language, how they do and can combine into words, and explains why certain phonetic features are important to identifying a word.

=== Typology ===
Linguistic typology (or language typology) is a field of linguistics that studies and classifies languages according to their structural features to allow their comparison. Its aim is to describe and explain the structural diversity and the common properties of the world's languages. Its subdisciplines include, but are not limited to: phonological typology, which deals with sound features; syntactic typology, which deals with word order and form; lexical typology, which deals with language vocabulary; and theoretical typology, which aims to explain the universal tendencies.

== Structures ==
Linguistic structures are pairings of meaning and form. Any particular pairing of meaning and form is a Saussurean linguistic sign. For instance, the meaning "cat" is represented worldwide with a wide variety of different sound patterns (in oral languages), movements of the hands and face (in sign languages), and written symbols (in written languages). Linguistic patterns have proven their importance for the knowledge engineering field especially with the ever-increasing amount of available data.

Linguists focusing on structure attempt to understand the rules regarding language use that native speakers know (not always consciously). All linguistic structures can be broken down into component parts that are combined according to (sub)conscious rules, over multiple levels of analysis. For instance, consider the structure of the word "tenth" on two different levels of analysis. On the level of internal word structure (known as morphology), the word "tenth" is made up of one linguistic form indicating a number and another form indicating ordinality. The rule governing the combination of these forms ensures that the ordinality marker "th" follows the number "ten". On the level of sound structure (known as phonology), structural analysis shows that the "n" sound in "tenth" is made differently from the "n" sound in "ten" spoken alone. Although most speakers of English are consciously aware of the rules governing internal structure of the word pieces of "tenth", they are less often aware of the rule governing its sound structure. Linguists focused on structure find and analyze rules such as these, which govern how native speakers use language.

=== Grammar ===
Grammar is a system of rules which governs the production and use of utterances in a given language. These rules apply to sound as well as meaning, and include componential subsets of rules, such as those pertaining to phonology (the organization of phonetic sound systems), morphology (the formation and composition of words), and syntax (the formation and composition of phrases and sentences). Modern frameworks that deal with the principles of grammar include structural and functional linguistics, and generative linguistics.

Sub-fields that focus on a grammatical study of language include the following:

- Phonetics, the study of the physical properties of speech sound production and perception, and delves into their acoustic and articulatory properties
- Phonology, the study of sounds as abstract elements in the speaker's mind that distinguish meaning (phonemes)
- Morphology, the study of morphemes, or the internal structures of words and how they can be modified
- Syntax, the study of how words combine to form grammatical phrases and sentences
- Semantics, the study of lexical and grammatical aspects of meaning
- Pragmatics, the study of how utterances are used in communicative acts, and the role played by situational context and non-linguistic knowledge in the transmission of meaning
- Discourse analysis, the analysis of language use in texts (spoken, written, or signed)
- Stylistics, the study of linguistic factors (rhetoric, diction, stress) that place a discourse in context
- Semiotics, the study of signs and sign processes (semiosis), indication, designation, likeness, analogy, metaphor, symbolism, signification, and communication

=== Discourse ===
Discourse is language as social practice (Baynham, 1995) and is a multilayered concept. As a social practice, discourse embodies different ideologies through written and spoken texts. Discourse analysis can examine or expose these ideologies. Discourse not only influences genre, which is selected based on specific contexts but also, at a micro level, shapes language as text (spoken or written) down to the phonological and lexico-grammatical levels. Grammar and discourse are linked as parts of a system. A particular discourse becomes a language variety when it is used in this way for a particular purpose, and is referred to as a register. There may be certain lexical additions (new words) that are brought into play because of the expertise of the community of people within a certain domain of specialization. Thus, registers and discourses distinguish themselves not only through specialized vocabulary but also, in some cases, through distinct stylistic choices. People in the medical fraternity, for example, may use some medical terminology in their communication that is specialized to the field of medicine. This is often referred to as being part of the "medical discourse", and so on.

=== Lexicon ===
The lexicon is a catalogue of words and terms that are stored in a speaker's mind. The lexicon consists of words and bound morphemes, which are parts of words that can not stand alone, like affixes. In some analyses, compound words and certain classes of idiomatic expressions and other collocations are also considered to be part of the lexicon. Dictionaries represent attempts at listing, in alphabetical order, the lexicon of a given language; usually, however, bound morphemes are not included. Lexicography, closely linked with the domain of semantics, is the science of mapping the words into an encyclopedia or a dictionary. The creation and addition of new words (into the lexicon) is called coining or neologization, and the new words are called neologisms.

It is often believed that a speaker's capacity for language lies in the quantity of words stored in the lexicon. However, this is often considered a myth by linguists. The capacity for the use of language is considered by many linguists to lie primarily in the domain of grammar, and to be linked with competence, rather than with the growth of vocabulary. Even a very small lexicon is theoretically capable of producing an infinite number of sentences.

Vocabulary size is relevant as a measure of comprehension. There is general consensus that reading comprehension of a written text in English requires 98% coverage, meaning that the person understands 98% of the words in the text. The question of how much vocabulary is needed is therefore related to which texts or conversations need to be understood. A common estimate is 6-7,000 word families to understand a wide range of conversations and 8-9,000 word families to be able to read a wide range of written texts.

=== Style ===
Stylistics involves the study of written, signed, or spoken discourse through varying speech communities, genres, and editorial or narrative formats in the mass media. It involves the study and interpretation of texts for aspects of their linguistic and tonal style. Stylistic analysis entails the analysis of description of particular dialects and registers used by speech communities. Stylistic features include rhetoric, diction, stress, satire, irony, dialogue, and other forms of phonetic variations. Stylistic analysis can also include the study of language in canonical works of literature, popular fiction, news, advertisements, and other forms of communication in popular culture as well. It is usually seen as a variation in communication that changes from speaker to speaker and community to community. In short, Stylistics is the interpretation of text.

In the 1960s, Jacques Derrida, for instance, further distinguished between speech and writing, by proposing that written language be studied as a linguistic medium of communication in itself. Palaeography is therefore the discipline that studies the evolution of written scripts (as signs and symbols) in language. The formal study of language also led to the growth of fields like psycholinguistics, which explores the representation and function of language in the mind; neurolinguistics, which studies language processing in the brain; biolinguistics, which studies the biology and evolution of language; and language acquisition, which investigates how children and adults acquire the knowledge of one or more languages.

== Methodology ==
Modern linguistics is primarily descriptive. Linguists describe and explain features of language without making subjective judgments on whether a particular feature or usage is "good" or "bad". This is analogous to practice in other sciences: a zoologist studies the animal kingdom without making subjective judgments on whether a particular species is "better" or "worse" than another.

Prescription, on the other hand, is an attempt to promote particular linguistic usages over others, often favoring a particular dialect or "acrolect". This may have the aim of establishing a linguistic standard, which can aid communication over large geographical areas. It may also, however, be an attempt by speakers of one language or dialect to exert influence over speakers of other languages or dialects (see Linguistic imperialism). An extreme version of prescriptivism can be found among censors, who attempt to eradicate words and structures that they consider to be destructive to society. Prescription, however, may be practised appropriately in language instruction, like in ELT, where certain fundamental grammatical rules and lexical items need to be introduced to a second-language speaker who is attempting to acquire the language.

=== Sources ===
Most contemporary linguists work under the assumption that spoken data and signed data are more fundamental than written data. This is because

- Speech appears to be universal to all human beings capable of producing and perceiving it, while there have been many cultures and speech communities that lack written communication;
- Features appear in speech which are not always recorded in writing, including phonological rules, sound changes, and speech errors;
- All natural writing systems reflect a spoken language (or potentially a signed one), even with pictographic scripts like Dongba writing Naxi homophones with the same pictogram, and text in writing systems used for two languages changing to fit the spoken language being recorded;
- Speech evolved before human beings invented writing;
- Individuals learn to speak and process spoken language more easily and earlier than they do with writing.

Nonetheless, linguists agree that the study of written language can be worthwhile and valuable. For research that relies on corpus linguistics and computational linguistics, written language is often much more convenient for processing large amounts of linguistic data. Large corpora of spoken language are difficult to create and hard to find, and are typically transcribed and written. In addition, linguists have turned to text-based discourse occurring in various formats of computer-mediated communication as a viable site for linguistic inquiry.

The study of writing systems themselves, graphemics, is, in any case, considered a branch of linguistics.

=== Analysis ===
Before the 20th century, linguists analysed language on a diachronic plane, which was historical in focus. This meant that they would compare linguistic features and try to analyse language from the point of view of how it had changed between then and later. However, with the rise of Saussurean linguistics in the 20th century, the focus shifted to a more synchronic approach, where the study was geared towards analysis and comparison between different language variations, which existed at the same given point of time.

At another level, the syntagmatic plane of linguistic analysis entails the comparison between the way words are sequenced, within the syntax of a sentence. For example, the article "the" is followed by a noun, because of the syntagmatic relation between the words. The paradigmatic plane, on the other hand, focuses on an analysis that is based on the paradigms or concepts that are embedded in a given text. In this case, words of the same type or class may be replaced in the text with each other to achieve the same conceptual understanding.

== History ==
The earliest activities in the description of language have been attributed to the 6th-century BC Indian grammarian Pāṇini who composed a formal description of the Sanskrit language in his Aṣṭādhyāyī. Today, modern-day theories on grammar employ many of the principles that were laid down then.

=== Nomenclature ===
Before the 20th century, the term philology, first attested in 1716, was commonly used to refer to the study of language, which was then predominantly historical in focus. Since Ferdinand de Saussure's insistence on the importance of synchronic analysis, however, this focus has shifted and the term philology is now generally used for the "study of a language's grammar, history, and literary tradition", especially in the United States (where philology has never been very popularly considered as the "science of language").

Although the term linguist in the sense of "a student of language" dates from 1641, the term linguistics is first attested in 1847. It is now the usual term in English for the scientific study of language, though linguistic science is sometimes used.

Linguistics is a multi-disciplinary field of research that combines tools from natural sciences, social sciences, formal sciences, and the humanities. Many linguists, such as David Crystal, conceptualize the field as being primarily scientific. The term linguist applies to someone who studies language or is a researcher within the field, or to someone who uses the tools of the discipline to describe and analyse specific languages.

=== Early grammarians ===
An early formal study of language was undertaken in India by the 6th-century BC grammarian Pāṇini, who formulated 3,959 rules of Sanskrit morphology. Pāṇini's systematic classification of the sounds of Sanskrit into consonants and vowels, and word classes, such as nouns and verbs, was the first known instance of its kind. In the Middle East, Sibawayh, a Persian, made a detailed description of Arabic in AD 760 in his monumental work, Al-kitab fii an-naħw (الكتاب في النحو, The Book on Grammar), the first known author to distinguish between sounds and phonemes, or sounds as units of a linguistic system. Western interest in the study of languages began somewhat later than in the East, but the grammarians of the classical languages did not use the same methods or reach the same conclusions as their contemporaries in the Indic world. Early interest in language in the West was a part of philosophy, not of grammatical description. The first insights into semantic theory were made by Plato in his Cratylus dialogue, where he argues that words denote concepts that are eternal and exist in the world of ideas. This work was the first to 'etymology' to describe the history of a word's meaning. Around 280 BC, one of Alexander the Great's successors founded a university (see Musaeum) in Alexandria, where a school of philologists studied the ancient texts in Greek, and taught Greek to speakers of other languages. While this school was the first to use the word "grammar" in its modern sense, Plato had used the word in its original meaning as "téchnē grammatikḗ" (Τέχνη Γραμματική), the "art of writing", which is also the title of one of the most important works of the Alexandrine school by Dionysius Thrax. Throughout the Middle Ages, the study of language was subsumed under the topic of philology, the study of ancient languages and texts, practised by such educators as Roger Ascham, Wolfgang Ratke, and John Amos Comenius.

=== Comparative philology ===
In the 18th century, the first use of the comparative method by William Jones sparked the rise of comparative linguistics. Bloomfield attributes "the first great scientific linguistic work of the world" to Jacob Grimm, who wrote Deutsche Grammatik. It was soon followed by other authors writing similar comparative studies on other language groups of Europe. The study of language was broadened from Indo-European to language in general by Wilhelm von Humboldt, of whom Bloomfield asserts:

This study received its foundation at the hands of the Prussian statesman and scholar Wilhelm von Humboldt (1767–1835), especially in the first volume of his work on Kavi, the literary language of Java, entitled Über die Verschiedenheit des menschlichen Sprachbaues und ihren Einfluß auf die geistige Entwickelung des Menschengeschlechts (On the Variety of the Structure of Human Language and its Influence upon the Mental Development of the Human Race).

=== 20th-century developments ===
There was a shift of focus from historical and comparative linguistics to synchronic analysis in early 20th century. Structural analysis was improved by Leonard Bloomfield, Louis Hjelmslev; and Zellig Harris who also developed methods of discourse analysis. Functional analysis was developed by the Prague linguistic circle and André Martinet. As sound recording devices became commonplace in the 1960s, dialectal recordings were made and archived, and the audio-lingual method provided a technological solution to foreign language learning. The 1960s also saw a new rise of comparative linguistics: the study of language universals in linguistic typology. Towards the end of the century the field of linguistics became divided into further areas of interest with the advent of language technology and digitalized corpora.

== Areas of research ==
=== Sociolinguistics ===
Sociolinguistics is the study of how language is shaped by social factors. This sub-discipline focuses on the synchronic approach of linguistics, and looks at how a language in general, or a set of languages, display variation and varieties at a given point in time. The study of language variation and the different varieties of language through dialects, registers, and idiolects can be tackled through a study of style, as well as through analysis of discourse. Sociolinguists research both style and discourse in language, as well as the theoretical factors that are at play between language and society.

=== Developmental linguistics ===
Developmental linguistics is the study of the development of linguistic ability in individuals, particularly the acquisition of language in childhood. Some of the questions that developmental linguistics looks into are how children acquire different languages, how adults can acquire a second language, and what the process of language acquisition is.

=== Neurolinguistics ===
Neurolinguistics is the study of the structures in the human brain that underlie grammar and communication. Researchers are drawn to the field from a variety of backgrounds, bringing along a variety of experimental techniques as well as widely varying theoretical perspectives. Much work in neurolinguistics is informed by models in psycholinguistics and theoretical linguistics, and is focused on investigating how the brain can implement the processes that theoretical and psycholinguistics propose are necessary in producing and comprehending language. Neurolinguists study the physiological mechanisms by which the brain processes information related to language, and evaluate linguistic and psycholinguistic theories, using aphasiology, brain imaging, electrophysiology, and computer modelling. Amongst the structures of the brain involved in the mechanisms of neurolinguistics, the cerebellum which contains the highest numbers of neurons has a major role in terms of predictions required to produce language.

=== Applied linguistics ===
Linguists are largely concerned with finding and describing the generalities and varieties both within particular languages and among all languages. Applied linguistics takes the results of those findings and "applies" them to other areas. Linguistic research is commonly applied to areas such as language education, lexicography, translation, language planning, which involves governmental policy implementation related to language use, and natural language processing. "Applied linguistics" has been argued to be something of a misnomer. Applied linguists actually focus on making sense of and engineering solutions for real-world linguistic problems, and not literally "applying" existing technical knowledge from linguistics. Moreover, they commonly apply technical knowledge from multiple sources, such as sociology (e.g., conversation analysis) and anthropology. (Constructed language fits under Applied linguistics.)

Today, computers are widely used in many areas of applied linguistics. Speech synthesis and speech recognition use phonetic and phonemic knowledge to provide voice interfaces to computers. Applications of computational linguistics in machine translation, computer-assisted translation, and natural language processing are areas of applied linguistics that have come to the forefront. Their influence has had an effect on theories of syntax and semantics, as modelling syntactic and semantic theories on computers constraints.

Linguistic analysis is a sub-discipline of applied linguistics used by many governments to verify the claimed nationality of people seeking asylum who do not hold the necessary documentation to prove their claim. This often takes the form of an interview by personnel in an immigration department. Depending on the country, this interview is conducted either in the asylum seeker's native language through an interpreter or in an international lingua franca like English. Australia uses the former method, while Germany employs the latter; the Netherlands uses either method depending on the languages involved. Tape recordings of the interview then undergo language analysis, which can be done either by private contractors or within a department of the government. In this analysis, linguistic features of the asylum seeker are used by analysts to make a determination about the speaker's nationality. The reported findings of the linguistic analysis can play a critical role in the government's decision on the refugee status of the asylum seeker.

=== Language documentation ===
Language documentation combines anthropological inquiry (into the history and culture of language) with linguistic inquiry, in order to describe languages and their grammars. Lexicography involves the documentation of words that form a vocabulary. Such a documentation of a linguistic vocabulary from a particular language is usually compiled in a dictionary. Computational linguistics is concerned with the statistical or rule-based modeling of natural language from a computational perspective. Specific knowledge of language is applied by speakers during the act of translation and interpretation, as well as in language education – the teaching of a second or foreign language. Policy makers work with governments to implement new plans in education and teaching which are based on linguistic research.

Since the inception of the discipline of linguistics, linguists have been concerned with describing and analysing previously undocumented languages. Starting with Franz Boas in the early 1900s, this became the main focus of American linguistics until the rise of formal linguistics in the mid-20th century. This focus on language documentation was partly motivated by a concern to document the rapidly disappearing languages of indigenous peoples. The ethnographic dimension of the Boasian approach to language description played a role in the development of disciplines such as sociolinguistics, anthropological linguistics, and linguistic anthropology, which investigate the relations between language, culture, and society.

The emphasis on linguistic description and documentation has also gained prominence outside North America, with the documentation of rapidly dying indigenous languages becoming a focus in some university programs in linguistics. Language description is a work-intensive endeavour, usually requiring years of field work in the language concerned, so as to equip the linguist to write a sufficiently accurate reference grammar. Further, the task of documentation requires the linguist to collect a substantial corpus in the language in question, consisting of texts and recordings, both sound and video, which can be stored in an accessible format within open repositories, and used for further research.

=== Translation ===
The sub-field of translation includes the translation of written and spoken texts across media, from digital to print and spoken. To translate literally means to transmute the meaning from one language into another. Translators are often employed by organizations such as travel agencies and governmental embassies to facilitate communication between two speakers who do not know each other's language. Translators are also employed to work within computational linguistics setups like Google Translate, which is an automated program to translate words and phrases between any two or more given languages. Translation is also conducted by publishing houses, which convert works of writing from one language to another in order to reach varied audiences. Cross-national and cross-cultural survey research studies employ translation to collect comparable data among multilingual populations. Academic translators specialize in or are familiar with various other disciplines such as technology, science, law, economics, etc. Soviet linguist Leonora Chernyakhovskaya developed an influential informational approach to translation, proposing that translation preserves semantic content while transforming linguistic expression, a framework that became foundational in Russian translation studies.

=== Clinical linguistics ===
Clinical linguistics is the application of linguistic theory to the field of speech-language pathology. Speech language pathologists work on corrective measures to treat communication and swallowing disorders.

=== Computational linguistics ===
Computational linguistics is the study of linguistic issues in a way that is "computationally responsible", i.e., taking careful note of computational consideration of algorithmic specification and computational complexity, so that the linguistic theories devised can be shown to exhibit certain desirable computational properties and their implementations. Computational linguists also work on computer language and software development.

=== Evolutionary linguistics ===
Evolutionary linguistics is a sociobiological approach to analyzing the emergence of the language faculty through human evolution, and also the application of evolutionary theory to the study of cultural evolution among different languages. It is also a study of the dispersal of various languages across the globe, through movements among ancient communities.

=== Forensic linguistics ===
Forensic linguistics is the application of linguistic analysis to forensics. Forensic analysis investigates the style, language, lexical use, and other linguistic and grammatical features used in the legal context to provide evidence in courts of law. Forensic linguists have also used their expertise in the framework of criminal cases.

== See also ==
- Articulatory phonetics – Branch of linguistics studying how humans make sounds
- Articulatory synthesis – Computational techniques for speech synthesis
- Axiom of categoricity – Controversial tenet of linguistic theory
- Critical discourse analysis – Interdisciplinary approach to study discourse
- Cryptanalysis – Study of analyzing information systems in order to discover their hidden aspects
- Decipherment – Rediscovery of a language or script's meaning
- Global language system – Connections between language groups
- Hermeneutics – The study of the methodological principles of interpretation
- Integrational linguistics – Theory of language
- Integrationism – Approach in the theory of communication
- Interlinguistics – Subfield of linguistics
- Language engineering – Creation of language processing systems
- Language geography – Study of the geographic distribution of languages
- Linguistic rights – Right to choose one's own language
- Metalinguistics – Study of relationship between language and culture
- Meta-communication – Communication about how information is meant to be interpreted
- Microlinguistics – Branch of linguistics
- Onomastics – Study of proper names
- Reading – Taking in the meaning of letters or symbols
- Speech processing – Study of speech signals and the processing methods of these signals
- Stratificational linguistics – Theory of language usage and production
- Outline and lists
  - Index of linguistics articles
  - List of summer schools of linguistics
  - List of schools of linguistics

== Bibliography ==
- Akmajian, Adrian; Demers, Richard; Farmer, Ann; Harnish, Robert (2010). Linguistics: An Introduction to Language and Communication. Cambridge, MA: The MIT Press. ISBN 978-0-262-51370-8.
- Aronoff, Mark; Rees-Miller, Janie, eds. (2000). The handbook of linguistics. Oxford: Blackwell.
- Bloomfield, Leonard (1983) [1914]. An Introduction to the Study of Language (New ed.). Amsterdam: John Benjamins Publishing. ISBN 978-90-272-8047-3.
- Chomsky, Noam (1998). On Language. The New Press, New York. ISBN 978-1-56584-475-9.
- Crystal, David (1990). Linguistics. Penguin Books. ISBN 978-0-14-013531-2.
- Derrida, Jacques (1967). Of Grammatology. The Johns Hopkins University Press. ISBN 978-0-8018-5830-7.
- Hall, Christopher (2005). An Introduction to Language and Linguistics: Breaking the Language Spell. Routledge. ISBN 978-0-8264-8734-6.
- Isac, Daniela; Charles Reiss (2013). I-language: An Introduction to Linguistics as Cognitive Science (2nd ed.). Oxford University Press. ISBN 978-0-19-966017-9. Archived from the original on 6 July 2011.
- McShane, Marjorie; Nirenburg, Sergei (2021). Linguistics for the Age of AI. MIT Press. ISBN 9780262363136. Archived from the original on 6 March 2025.
