= Microaggression =

Unintentional contempt or disrespect toward marginalized groups

Microaggression is a term used for commonplace verbal, behavioral or environmental slight, whether intentional or unintentional, that communicates hostile, derogatory, or negative attitudes toward members of marginalized groups. The term was coined by Harvard University psychiatrist Chester M. Pierce in 1970 to describe insults and dismissals which he regularly witnessed non-black Americans inflicting on African Americans. By the early 21st century, use of the term was applied to the casual disparagement of any socially marginalized group, including LGBT, poor, and disabled people. Psychologist Derald Wing Sue defines microaggressions as "brief, everyday exchanges that send denigrating messages to certain individuals because of their group membership". In contrast to aggression, in which there is usually an intent to cause harm, persons making microaggressive comments may be otherwise well-intentioned and unaware of the potential impact of their words.

A number of scholars and social commentators have criticized the concept of microaggression for its lack of a scientific basis, over-reliance on subjective evidence, and promotion of psychological fragility. Critics argue that avoiding behaviors that one interprets as microaggressions restricts one's own freedom and causes emotional self-harm, and that employing authority figures to address microaggressions (i.e. call-out culture) can lead to an atrophy of those skills needed to mediate one's own disputes. Some argue that, because the term "microaggression" uses language connoting violence to describe verbal conduct, it can be abused to exaggerate harm, resulting in retribution and the elevation of victimhood.

Sue, who popularized the term microaggressions, has expressed doubts on how the concept is being used: "I was concerned that people who use these examples would take them out of context and use them as a punitive rather than an exemplary way." In the 2020 edition of his book with Lisa Spanierman and in a 2021 book with his doctoral students, Dr. Sue introduces the idea of "microinterventions" as potential solutions to acts of microaggression.

== Description ==
Microaggressions are common, everyday slights and comments that relate to various aspects of one's appearance or identity such as class, gender, sex, sexual orientation, race, ethnicity, mother tongue, age, body shape, disability, or religion. They are thought to spring from unconsciously held prejudices and beliefs which may be demonstrated consciously or unconsciously through daily interactions. Although these communications typically appear harmless to observers, they are considered a form of subtle or everyday discrimination, like covert racism.

=== Meaning of "micro-" ===
Microaggressions differ from what Pierce referred to as "macroaggressions" in the context of racial discrimination: these are more extreme forms of racism (such as lynchings or beatings), differentiated due to their ambiguity, size and commonality. Today, researchers do not use the prefix "micro-" to mean the aggressions have a small impact, but instead to emphasize how subtly they take place, which can make them hard to point out. In fact, research on the impacts of repeated microaggressions towards members of minority groups suggests that microaggressions negatively affect mental health and are related to minority stress.

=== Marginalization and bias ===
Microaggressions are experienced by most stigmatized individuals and occur on a regular basis. These can be particularly stressful for people on the receiving end as the harm or bias inherent to a microaggression is easily denied by those committing them. Because microaggressions are rooted in bias, which is societally taught, they can be committed by members of dominant social groups or members of marginalized groups.

The impact of microaggressions is shaped by the dilemma of unconscious bias: perpetrators of microaggressions may view their actions or motivations differently than targets do, especially when offenders can ignore or dismiss implicit bias if it is in fact present. Additionally, this bias is most invisible to members of dominant social groups, and it is easy for observers to dismiss a microaggression as trivial and harmless. This makes it harder for a target to respond to a microaggression without backlash. The key factor here is that microaggressions are harder to detect by members of the dominant culture, as they are often unaware they are causing harm.

=== Types ===
Microaggressions are often divided into three categories: each can be verbal or action-based, but they are united by their effect of insulting someone due to their membership in a marginalized group. All categories may occur between individuals or through an environment, via social norms or policies. Categories of microaggressions are usually called microinsults, for demeaning, rude, stereotyping or insensitive behavior; microinvalidations, for behavior that excludes or denies someone else's experiences; and microassaults, for more explicit discriminatory actions or insults. Microassaults may be an exception to the generally unconscious and subtle nature of microaggressions: some of the behaviors researchers have classified as microassault are so traumatic and overt, and perhaps frequently rooted in conscious bias, that some researchers have proposed reclassifying them outside of microaggressions.

== Targeted identities ==
Microaggressions are a form of everyday discrimination against stigmatized groups of people. Researchers often study microaggressions by examining how they occur for specific marginalized populations. By looking at common themes in these settings, some researchers have built taxonomies of the types of microaggressions that target people based on different parts of their identities.

Microaggressions were originally studied in the context of racial discrimination in the U.S. Since then, they have been studied in the context of many other marginalizations, including LGBTQ communities, people with disabilities or mental health conditions, religious minorities, and people living in poverty. Microaggressions can also be intersectional, targeting people based on more than one aspect of their identity.

Researchers have studied the experiences of many specific communities with microaggressions. Selected examples include left-handed surgeons, Canadian and British fat people, working-class graduate students, first-generation U.S. university students, people who speak Japanese as a second language in Japan, and Palestinians working in Jewish organizations in Israel.

=== Race or ethnicity ===
Social scientists Sue, Bucceri, Lin, Nadal, and Torino (2007) described microaggressions as "the new face of racism", saying that the nature of racism has shifted over time from overt expressions of racial hatred and hate crimes, toward expressions of aversive racism, such as microaggressions, that are more subtle, ambiguous, and often unintentional. Sue says this has led some Americans to believe wrongly that non-white Americans no longer suffer from racism. One example of such subtle expressions of racism is Asian students being either pathologized or penalized as too passive or quiet. An incident that caused controversy at UCLA occurred when a teacher corrected a student's use of "indigenous" in a paper by changing it from upper- to lowercase.

According to Sue et al., microaggressions seem to appear in four forms:

- Microassault: an explicit racial derogation; verbal/nonverbal; e.g. name-calling, avoidant behavior, purposeful discriminatory actions.
- Microinsult: communications that convey rudeness and insensitivity and demean a person's racial heritage or identity; subtle snubs; unknown to the perpetrator; hidden insulting message to the recipient.
- Microinvalidation: communications that exclude, negate, or nullify the psychological thoughts, feelings, or experiential reality of a person belonging to a particular group.
- Environmental Microaggressions (Macro-Level): Racial assaults, insults and invalidations which are manifested on systemic and environmental level.

Some psychologists have criticized microaggression theory for assuming that all verbal, behavioral, or environmental indignities are due to bias. Thomas Schacht says that it is uncertain whether a behavior is due to racial bias or is a larger phenomenon that occurs regardless of identity conflict. However, Kanter and colleagues found that racial microaggressions were robustly correlated to five separate measures of bias. In reviewing the microaggression literature, Scott Lilienfeld suggested that microassaults should probably be struck from the taxonomy because the examples provided in the literature tend not to be "micro", but are outright assaults, intimidation, harassment and bigotry; in some cases, examples have included criminal acts. Others have pointed out that what could be perceived as subtle snubs could be due to people having autism, and assuming ill will could be harmful to people with autism.

==== Examples ====
In conducting two focus groups with Asian-Americans, for instance, Sue proposed different themes under the ideology of microinsult and microinvalidation.

Microinvalidation:

- Alien in own land: When people assume people of color are foreigners.
  - E.g.: "So where are you really from?" or "Why don't you have an accent?"
- Denial of racial reality: When people emphasize that a person of color does not suffer from racial discrimination or inequality (this correlates to the idea of model minority).
- Invisibility: Asian-Americans are considered invisible or outside discussions of race and racism.
  - E.g.: Discussions on race in the United States excluding Asian-Americans by focusing only on 'white and black' issues.
- Refusal to acknowledge intra-ethnic differences: When a speaker ignores intra-ethnic differences and assumes a broad homogeneity over multiple ethnic groups.
  - E.g.: Descriptions such as "all Asian-Americans look alike", or assumptions that all members of an ethnic minority speak the same language or have the same cultural values.

Microinsult:

- Pathologizing cultural values/communication styles: When Asian American culture and values are viewed as less desirable.
  - E.g.: Viewing the valuation of silence (a cultural norm present in some Asian communities) as a fault, leading to disadvantages caused by the expectation of verbal participation common in many Western academic settings.
- Second-class citizenship: When minorities are treated as lesser human beings, or are not treated with equal rights or priority.
  - E.g.: A Korean man asking for a drink in a bar being ignored by the bartender, or the bartender choosing to serve a white man before serving the Korean man.
- Ascription of intelligence: When people of color are stereotyped to have a certain level of intelligence based on their race.
  - E.g.: "You people always do well in school", or "If I see a lot of Asian students in my class, I know it's going to be a hard class".
- Exoticization of non-white women: When non-white women are stereotyped as being in the "exotic" category based on gender, appearance, and media expectations.
  - E.g.: Descriptions of an Asian-American woman as a 'Dragon Lady', 'Tiger mother', or 'Lotus Blossom', or using symbols associated with Eastern cultures.

In a 2017 peer-reviewed review of the literature, Scott Lilienfeld critiqued microaggression research for hardly having advanced beyond taxonomies such as the above, which was proposed by Sue nearly ten years earlier. While acknowledging the reality of "subtle slights and insults directed toward minorities", Lilienfeld concluded that the concept and programs for its scientific assessment are "far too underdeveloped on the conceptual and methodological fronts to warrant real-world application". He recommended abandonment of the term microaggression since "the use of the root word 'aggression' in 'microaggression' is conceptually confusing and misleading". In addition, he called for a moratorium on microaggression training programs until further research can develop the field.

In 2017 Althea Nagai, who worked as a research fellow at the conservative Center for Equal Opportunity, published an article in the National Association of Scholars journal, criticizing microaggression research as pseudoscience. Nagai said that critical race theory influences microaggression theory and that researchers "reject the methodology and standards of modern science." She lists various technical shortcomings of research on racial microaggressions, including "biased interview questions, reliance on narrative and small numbers of respondents, problems of reliability, issues of replicability, and ignoring alternative explanations."

=== Gender ===
Gender microaggressions may replace more blatant forms of sexism and gender discrimination when a society evolves sufficiently for those forms of outright prejudice to be deemed no longer acceptable. For instance, explicit sexism in the society of the US is on the decline, but still exists in a variety of subtle and non-subtle expressions. Women encounter microaggressions in which they are made to feel inferior, sexually objectified, and bound to restrictive gender roles, both in the workplace and in academia, as well as in athletics. Microaggressions against sexual and gender minority people and cisgender women share many common themes.

Influential early studies on gender microaggressions documented common themes across incidents. The themes are sexual objectification, treatment as an invisible or second-class citizen, assuming inferiority, denying the reality of sexism, assuming traditional gender roles, using sexist language, denying one's own sexism, and systemic or environmental issues. As one example, when one employer paid women less than men for the same work, it sent the message that the company believed women were less smart or capable than men, fitting the themes of second-class citizen and environmental mistreatment. Researchers continue to draw out further themes for classifying gender microaggressions, like expectations for people's appearances.

Gender microaggressions fit into the three types of microaggressions: microassault, microinsult, and microinvalidation. Catcalling is a form of sexual objectification and gendered slurs are a use of sexist language, but both could be classified as blatant, likely conscious, acts of microassault. Overlooking women for physical tasks, which signals an assumption that women are weak, has a theme of assuming inferiority: this can be considered a microinsult due to its more subtle insulting message. Dismissing an employee's complaint of a coworker's sexist behavior can be a form of denying the reality of sexism, and also a microinvalidation. However, researchers have debated how the frameworks of gender microaggressions, sexual harassment, and sexual assault intersect. Behaviors classified as gender microassaults frequently overlap with harassment and assault, so labeling them as microassaults may thus be confusing and invalidating.

Some examples of gender microaggressions are "[addressing someone by using] a sexist name, a man refusing to wash dishes because it is 'women's work,' displaying nude pin-ups of women at places of employment, someone making unwanted sexual advances toward another person". Microaggressions based on gender are applied to female athletes when their abilities are compared only to men, when they are judged on "attractiveness", and when they are restricted to "feminine" or sexually attractive attire during competition. Some of the most-studied environmental microaggressions include biased media portrayals of women, gender disparities in leadership across society or for a career, and overheard everyday discriminatory messages. Makin and Morczek use the term gendered microaggression to refer to male interest in violent rape pornography.

Microaggressions specifically targeting transgender, non-binary, and gender-nonconforming people are documented in a growing body of studies, usually involving interviews with transgender people about their experiences. One 2012 study documented a set of themes that commonly occur in these microaggressions: the use of transphobic or misgendering language, threatening or harassing behaviors, assuming a stereotypical trans experience, exoticizing, pathologizing, or disapproving of trans people, assuming roles based on the gender binary, denying that transphobia exists or denying one's own transphobic actions, and invading bodily privacy. One theme centers around family settings, where family members may refuse to use a trans person's pronouns or the name that aligns with their gender identity. A 2014 study noted another theme among microaggressions towards trans people, where the perpetrator questions the legitimacy of a gender identity or invalidates the target's specific gender identity.

Some studies suggest that the microaggressions a trans person experiences from their friends tend to vary depending on the sexuality and gender identity of their friend. Microaggressions coming from trans friends may involve invalidating someone's trans identity or questioning their authenticity as a trans person, and these may be the most distressing microaggressions because of the similar identity of the friend. Microaggressions coming from queer friends who aren't trans may feel disappointing because the friend is in a relatedly marginalized group but still committed the behavior. Microaggressions from straight cisgender friends often follow the set of general themes of microaggressions towards trans people, and these occur much more frequently than microaggressions from queer friends.

Systemic microaggressions targeting trans people frequently happen in the context of public restrooms, the criminal justice system, emergency healthcare, and government IDs. Sociologists Sonny Nordmarken and Reese Kelly (2014) identified trans-specific microaggressions that transgender people face in healthcare settings, which include pathologization, sexualization, rejection, invalidation, exposure, isolation, intrusion, and coercion.

=== Sexuality and sexual orientation ===
Microaggressions about sexual orientation can be rooted in heterosexist language and heteronormativity; stereotyping, deriding, undersexualizing or exoticizing the LGBTQ experience; or denying that heterosexism exists. Documented sources of systemic microaggressions include the media, religious groups, governments and educational organizations. Systemic microaggressions can involve negative, discriminatory portrayals and policies that target people who aren't straight, or queer people more broadly. In some studies, researchers found that microaggressions affected queer targets' self-acceptance and self-esteem, increasing the potential for anxiety, stress, and PTSD symptoms. Microaggressions towards LGBTQ people are likely to cause less distress when the target has high levels of self-acceptance.

K. L. Nadal and M. J. Corpus documented some microaggressions against LGBTQ people in a pair of 2013 studies. Example microassaults (explicit insults) include using heterosexist language, like saying "that's so gay" as a put-down. Microinsults (subtly rude messaging) include comments rooted in stereotypes. As an example, a joke that a gay man couldn't like sports implies that all gay men are feminine, or a comment that a woman is too pretty to be lesbian implies that all lesbians are masculine. An example microinvalidation (denial of someone's reality) might happen after a queer person speaks up about a time they felt discriminated against, if someone then replies that the perception is unfounded or ridiculous and thus downplays transphobia or heterosexism.

Commonly experienced microaggressions differ for people of particular sexualities and gender presentations. Lesbians often face microaggressions rooted in misoygny, centering around expectations of their appearances, roles, and relationships. Lesbian and bisexual women experience disproportionate sexualization by heterosexual men. Lesbians have also reported experiences of undersexualization by friends and family, where they are treated as if their identity is a phase until "proven." Gay men commonly experience microaggressions involving derisive heterosexist language, and policing or denials of their masculinity. Microaggressions towards gay men are also often rooted in stereotypes which may be unrealistic and tokenizing, characterizing them as hypersexual, or demonizing and treating them as predatory.

In focus groups, individuals identifying as bisexual report such microaggressions as others denying or dismissing their self-narratives or identity claims, being unable to understand or accept bisexuality as a possibility, pressuring them to change their bisexual identity, expecting them to be sexually promiscuous, and questioning their ability to maintain monogamous relationships. Bisexual people, and especially bisexual men, have not received much individualized attention by researchers, and this can be understood as a systemic microaggression. In a 2013 study, most microaggressions bisexual people report are similar to those reported by gay and lesbian respondents, although bisexual people tended to face less sexuality-based stereotyping over what skills they were good at. On the other hand, bisexual people more frequently experienced microaggressions which treated them as if they were mostly straight or had never come out, and this added to people's negative internal beliefs and confusion over their identity.

Some LGBTQ individuals report receiving expressions of microaggression from people even within the LGBTQ community. They say that being excluded, or not being made welcome or understood within the gay and lesbian community is a microaggression. Roffee and Waling suggest that the issue arises, as occurs among many groups of people, because a person often makes assumptions based on individual experience, and when they communicate such assumptions, the recipient may feel that it lacks taking the second individual into account and is a form of microaggression.

Queer, trans, and gender-nonconforming people face an increased likelihood of experiencing microaggressions. Microaggressions faced by queer or trans folks can result in the scrutinization, exoticization, sexualization, fetishization, and further discrimination of this population. These microaggressions maintain “cis-sexism” and the perception that queer and trans folks are inferior or less authentic than cisgendered people. This may be a result of active, conventional, and harmful ways of thinking about gender and sexuality on a binary scale rather than as a spectrum.

=== Intersectionality ===
People who are members of overlapping marginal groups (e.g., a gay Asian American man or a gender-nonconforming trans woman) experience microaggressions based in correspondingly varied forms of marginalization. Research on intersectionality highlights that overlapping identities such as race, gender, and ability can shape distinct microaggression experiences that are not reducible to any single category. For example, in one study Asian American women reported feeling they were classified as sexually exotic by majority-culture men or were viewed by them as potential trophy wives simply because of their group membership. African American women report microaggressions related to characteristics of their hair, which may include invasion of personal space as an individual tries to touch it, or comments that a style that is different from that of a European American woman looks "unprofessional".

=== People with mental illnesses ===
People with mental illness report receiving more overt forms of microaggression than subtle ones, coming from family and friends as well as from authority figures. In fact, family, friends, and healthcare workers are some of the most common reported sources of microaggressions towards people with mental illness. In a study involving college students and adults who were being treated in community care, five themes were identified: invalidation, assumption of inferiority, fear of mental illness, shaming of mental illness, and being treated as a second-class citizen. Invalidation would occur, for example, when friends and family members minimized mental health symptoms; one participant described others claiming "You can't be depressed, you're smiling." People would sometimes falsely assume that mental illness means lower intelligence; a participant reported that the hospital staff in a psych ward were speaking to mentally ill patients as if they could not understand instructions.

Many documented mental health microaggressions have themes of stereotyping mental illness: whether the stereotype assumes people with mental illness are incapable, weak, dangerous, or cold, they share a negative association. Microaggressions also may involve treating people with mental illness differently than others: devaluing someone, patronizing them, or treating them like a child, speaking condescendingly or giving fake compliments, and increasing physical distance. Other themes include defining someone by their diagnosis or blaming or shaming someone for their illness. Mental health microaggressions may conversely involve invalidation via minimizing someone's experience, accusing people of using their mental illness as an excuse to avoid work or for seeking attention. Using mental health terms flippantly or incorrectly in everyday speech is another common microaggression.

=== Disability ===
Individuals who have an aspect of their identity that lacks a sense of systemic power are subject to microaggressions; thus, persons with disabilities are subject to ableist microaggressions. Like others with marginalized identities, microaggressions toward individuals with disabilities may manifest as a microassault, a microinsult, or a microinvalidation, all of which may also be executed as an environmental microaggression.

Current literature is available to better understand microaggressions in the context of ability. In one qualitative study, a group of researchers studied a sample of individuals with multiple sclerosis (MS) diagnoses. MS is a chronic disease that may impact mental, cognitive, and physical abilities. The researchers illustrated examples of real-life ableist microaggressions in the context of microassaults, microinsults, and microinvalidations faced by their sample, specifically in the workplace.

Meta-analytic findings show that frequent exposure to microaggressions is associated with reduced psychological well-being, increased stress, and poorer job outcomes among individuals with marginalized identities.

People with physical disabilities also face microaggressions, such as

- the misconception that those with disabilities want or require correction
- asking inappropriate questions

=== Ageism and intolerance ===
Microaggression can target and marginalize any definable group, including those who share an age grouping or belief system. Age-based microaggressions, or ageism, include subtle comments or behaviors that convey stereotypes about competence, adaptability, or relevance. Recent studies highlight how these microaggressions may affect both younger and older adults, leading to decreased belonging and heightened stress.

Microaggression is a manifestation of bullying that employs microlinguistic power plays in order to marginalize any target with a subtle manifestation of intolerance by signifying the concept of "other".

== Perpetrators ==
Because microaggressions are subtle and perpetrators may be unaware of the harm they cause, the recipients often experience attributional ambiguity, which may lead them to dismiss the event and blame themselves as overly sensitive to the encounter.

If challenged by the minority person or an observer, perpetrators will often defend their microaggression as a misunderstanding, a joke, or something small that should not be blown out of proportion.

A 2020 study involving American college students found a correlation between likelihood to commit microaggressions, and racial bias.

=== Media ===
Members of marginalized groups have also described microaggressions committed by performers or artists associated with various forms of media, such as television, film, photography, music, and books. Some researchers believe that such cultural content reflects but also molds society, allowing for unintentional bias to be absorbed by individuals based on their media consumption, as if it were expressed by someone with whom they had an encounter.

A study of racism in TV commercials describes microaggressions as gaining a cumulative weight, leading to inevitable clashes between races due to subtleties in the content. As an example of a racial microaggression, or microassault, this research found that black people were more likely than white counterparts to be shown eating or participating in physical activity, and more likely to be shown working for, or serving others. The research concludes by suggesting that microaggressive representations can be omitted from a body of work, without sacrificing creativity or profit.

Pérez Huber and Solorzano start their analysis of microaggressions with an anecdote about Mexican "bandits" as portrayed in a children's book read at bedtime. The article gives examples of negative stereotypes of Mexicans and Latinos in books, print, and photos, associating them with the state of racial discourse within majority culture and its dominance over minority groups in the US. The personification of these attitudes through media can also be applied to microaggressive behaviors towards other marginalized groups.

A 2015 review of the portrayal of LGBT characters in film says that gay or lesbian characters are presented in "offensive" ways. In contrast, LGBT characters portrayed as complex characters who are more than a cipher for their sexual orientation or identity are a step in the right direction. Ideally, "queer film audiences finally have a narrative pleasure that has been afforded to straight viewers since the dawn of film noir: a central character who is highly problematical, but fascinating."

== Effects ==
Recipients of microaggressions may feel anger, frustration, or exhaustion. African Americans have reported feeling under pressure to "represent" their group or to suppress their own cultural expression and "act white". Over time, the cumulative effect of microaggressions is thought by some to lead to diminished self-confidence and a poor self-image for individuals, and potentially also to such mental-health problems as depression, anxiety, and trauma. Many researchers have argued that microaggressions are more damaging than overt expressions of bigotry precisely because they are small and therefore often ignored or downplayed, leading the victim to feel self-doubt for noticing or reacting to the encounter, rather than justifiable anger, and isolation rather than support from others about such incidents.

Studies have found that in the U.S. when people of color perceived microaggressions from mental health professionals, client satisfaction with therapy is lower. An ethnographic study of transgender people in healthcare settings observed that participants sometimes responded to microaggressions by leaving a hospital in the middle of treatment, and never returning to a formal healthcare setting again.

Some studies suggest that microaggressions represent enough of a burden that some people of color may fear, distrust, and/or avoid relationships with white people in order to evade such interaction. On the other hand, some people report that dealing with microaggressions has made them more resilient. Scholars have suggested that, although microaggressions "might seem minor", they are "so numerous that trying to function in such a setting is 'like lifting a ton of feathers.'"

=== Relationship to harm ===
As of 2022, studies have demonstrated a relationship between worse health outcomes and experiences of microaggressions. These studies have not proven whether the microaggressions caused those outcomes.

A 2013 scholarly review of the literature on microaggressions concluded that "the negative impact of racial microaggressions on psychological and physical health is beginning to be documented; however, these studies have been largely correlational and based on recall and self-report, making it difficult to determine whether racial microaggressions actually cause negative health outcomes and, if so, through what mechanisms". A 2017 review of microaggression research argued that as scholars try to understand the possible harm caused by microaggressions, they have not conducted much cognitive or behavioral research, nor much experimental testing, and they have overly relied on small collections of anecdotal testimonies from samples who are not representative of any particular population. These assertions were later argued against in that same journal in 2020, but the response was criticized for failing to address the findings of the systematic reviews and continuing to draw causal inferences from correlational data. A 2022 meta-analysis concluded that experienced microaggressions were associated with worse psychological and physical health, more use of coping mechanisms, and negative job impacts, across a broad range of environments and types of people. These associations demonstrate correlation but cannot prove a causal relationship between microaggressions and negative effects.

== Criticism ==
=== Public discourse and harm to speakers ===
Kenneth R. Thomas wrote in American Psychologist that recommendations inspired by microaggression theory, if "implemented, could have a chilling effect on free speech and on the willingness of White people, including some psychologists, to interact with people of color." Sociologists Bradley Campbell and Jason Manning have written in the academic journal Comparative Sociology that the microaggression concept "fits into a larger class of conflict tactics in which the aggrieved seek to attract and mobilize the support of third parties" that sometimes involves "building a case for action by documenting, exaggerating, or even falsifying offenses". The concept of microaggressions has been described as a symptom of the breakdown in civil discourse, and that microaggressions are "yesterday's well-meaning faux pas".

One suggested type of microaggression by an Oxford University newsletter was avoiding eye contact or not speaking directly to people. This spurred a controversy in 2017 when it was pointed out that such assumptions are insensitive to autistic people who may have trouble making eye contact.

In a 2019 journal article, Scott Lilienfeld, who is a critic of microaggression theory, titled a section: "The Search for Common Ground." Lilienfeld agrees that "a discussion of microaggressions, however we choose to conceptualize them, may indeed have a place on college campuses and businesses." In such conversations, Lilienfeld states it is important to assume "most or all individuals…were genuinely offended," "to listen nondefensively to their concerns and reactions," and to "be open to the possibility that we have been inadvertently insensitive." In his latest book, Sue also recommends a "collaborative rather than an attacking tone."

=== Culture of victimhood ===
In their article "Microaggression and Moral Cultures", sociologists Bradley Campbell and Jason Manning say that the discourse of microaggression leads to a culture of victimhood. Social psychologist Jonathan Haidt states that this culture of victimhood lessens an individual's "ability to handle small interpersonal matters on one's own" and "creates a society of constant and intense moral conflict as people compete for status as victims or as defenders of victims". Similarly, the linguist and social commentator John McWhorter says that "it infantilizes black people to be taught that microaggressions, and even ones a tad more macro, hold us back, permanently damage our psychology, or render us exempt from genuine competition." McWhorter does not disagree that microaggressions exist. However, he worries that too much societal focus on microaggressions will cause other problems and has stated that the term should be confined to "when people belittle us on the basis of stereotypes."

=== Emotional distress ===
In The Atlantic, Greg Lukianoff and Jonathan Haidt expressed concern that the focus on microaggressions can cause more emotional trauma than the experience of the microaggressions at the time of occurrence. They believe that self-policing by an individual of thoughts or actions in order to avoid committing microaggressions may cause emotional harm as a person seeks to avoid becoming a microaggressor, as such extreme self-policing may share some characteristics of pathological thinking. Referring especially to prevention programs at schools or universities, they say that the element of protectiveness, of which identifying microaggression allegations are a part, prepares students "poorly for professional life, which often demands intellectual engagement with people and ideas one might find uncongenial or wrong". They also said that it has become "unacceptable to question the reasonableness (let alone the sincerity) of someone's emotional state", resulting in adjudication of alleged microaggressions having characteristics of witch trials.

Amitai Etzioni, writing in The Atlantic, suggested that attention to microaggressions distracts individuals and groups from dealing with much more serious acts.

=== Political correctness ===
According to Sue, many critiques are based on the term being misunderstood or misused. He said that his purpose in identifying such comments or actions was to educate people and not to silence or shame them. He further notes that, for instance, identifying that someone has used racial microaggressions is not intended to imply that they are racist.

=== Mind reading ===
According to Lilienfeld, a possible harmful effect of microaggression programs is to increase an individual's tendency to over-interpret the words of others in a negative way. Lilienfeld refers to this as mind reading, "in which individuals assume—without attempts at verification—that others are reacting negatively to them.... For example, Sue et al...regarded the question 'Where were you born?' directed at Asian Americans as a microaggression."

== In popular culture ==
Microaggression has been mentioned in popular culture since it was coined. In 2016, American academic Fobazi Ettarh created Killing Me Softly: A Game About Microaggressions, an open-access video game which allows players to navigate through the life of a character who experiences microaggression.

== See also ==
- Anti-LGBT rhetoric
- Cancel culture – ostracizing people for non-conformance to a value
- Intercultural communication
- Micro-inequity – micro-level understanding of microaggression
- Nitpicking – complaining about small problems
- Occupational sexism – sexism in the workplace
- Political correctness – pejorative term for less offensive language
- Safe space – place intended to be free of microaggressions for a group
- Trigger warning – intended to prevent flashbacks in trauma survivors
- White privilege
