= BMVA Summer School =

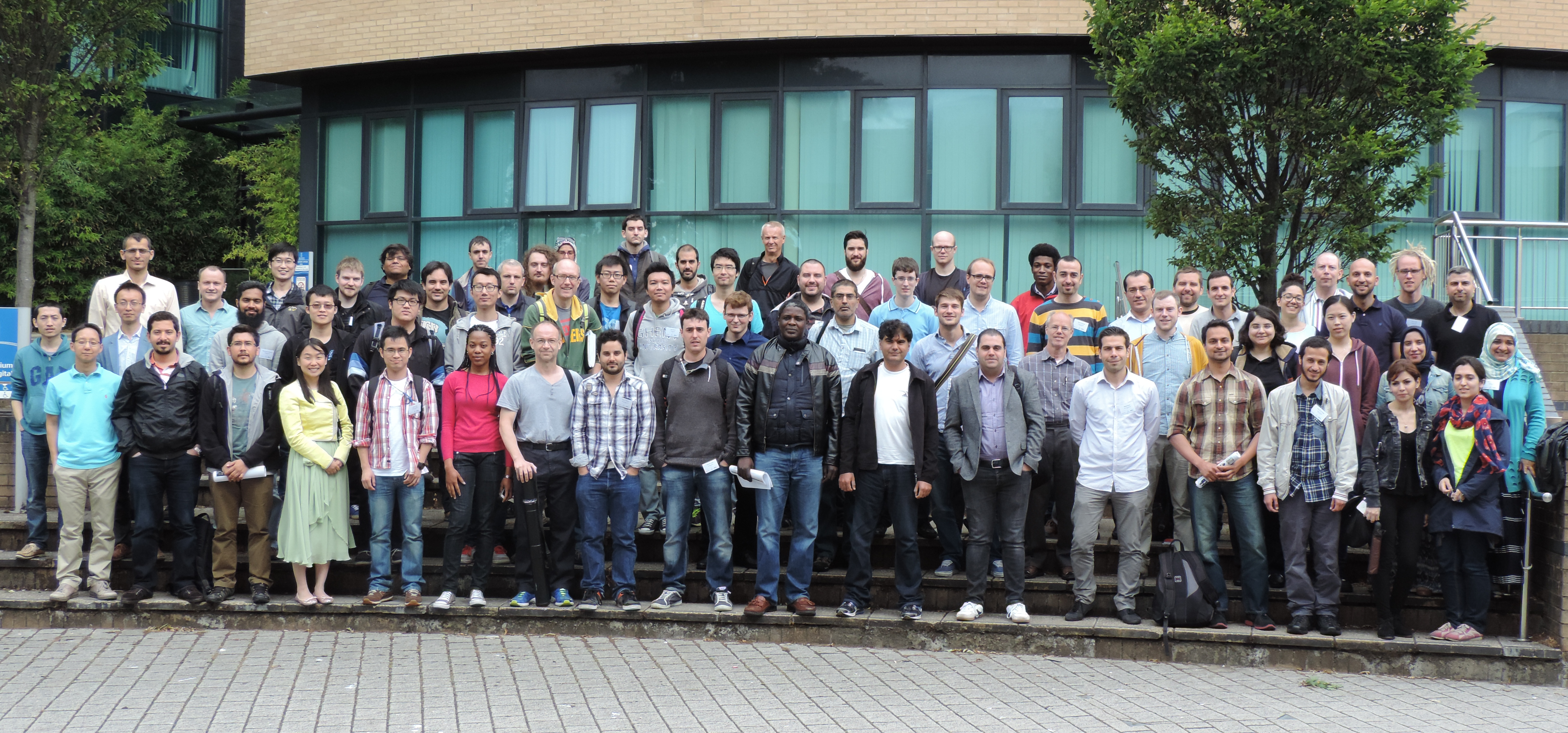
Attendants of the BMVA Summer School 2014.

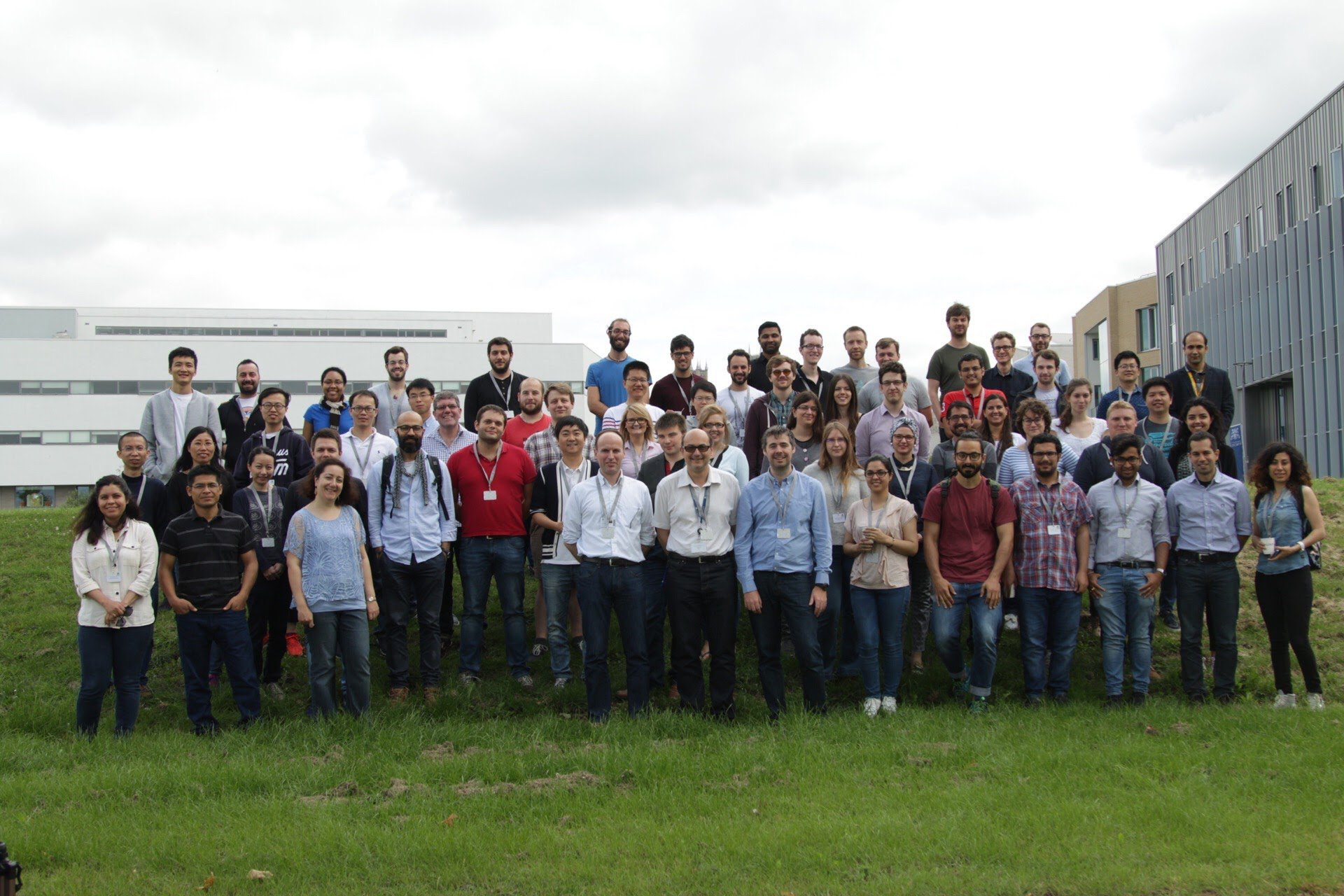
Attendants of the BMVA Summer School 2017 in Lincoln.

BMVA Summer School is an annual summer school on computer vision, organised by the British Machine Vision Association and Society for Pattern Recognition (BMVA). The course is residential, usually held over five days, and consists of lectures and practicals in topics in image processing, computer vision, pattern recognition. It is intended that the course will complement and extend the material in existing technical courses that many students/researchers will encounter in their early stage of postgraduate training or careers. It aims to broaden awareness of knowledge and techniques in Vision, Image Computing and Pattern Recognition, and to develop appropriate research skills, and for students to interact with their peers, and to make contacts among those who will be the active researchers of their own generation. It is open to students from both UK and non-UK universities. The registration fees vary based on time of registration and are in general slightly higher for non-UK students. The summer school has been hosted locally by various universities in UK that carry out Computer Vision research, e.g., Kingston University, the University of Manchester, Swansea University and University of Lincoln.

It has run since the mid-1990s, and content is updated every year. Speakers at the Summer School are active academic researchers or experienced practitioners from industry, mainly in the UK. It has received financial support from EPSRC from 2009 to 2012.

Delegates of the summer school are usually encouraged to bring posters to summer school to present their work to peers and lecturers. A best poster is selected by the summer school lecturers.
