= In the Library with the Lead Pipe =

- Discipline: Library science
- Language: English

Publication details
- History: 2008-present
- Frequency: Continuous
- Open access: Yes
- License: Creative Commons Attribution License 4.0

Standard abbreviations
- ISO 4: Libr. Lead Pipe

Indexing
- ISSN: 1944-6195
- LCCN: 2008214052
- OCLC no.: 848928592

Links
- Journal homepage; Online archive

In the Library with the Lead Pipe is a peer-reviewed academic journal that covers topics about libraries.

== Abstracting and indexing ==
The journal is abstracted and indexed in Library & Information Science Source and EBSCO databases.

== History ==
In the Library with the Lead Pipe was founded as a blog and then developed into a library practice journal. In 2014 the journal created "Library Pipeline", "a non-profit for developing library projects and librarians’ professional development".

A survey of 67 university librarians and archivists showed that only 5% were regular readers of In the Library with the Lead Pipe. The Library and Information Technology Association incorporated involvement with the journal into its 2010 strategic plan. A 2015 editorial in College & Research Libraries asserted that the journal "pushes forward a critical dimension, blurring the lines between blog and peer-reviewed journal." This includes authors such as Fobazi Ettarh, who defined the term "vocational awe" within a January 2018 article in the publication.
