= The Rise of Victimhood Culture =

2018 book by Bradley Campbell and Jason Manning

The Rise of Victimhood Culture: Microaggressions, Safe Spaces, and the New Culture Wars
- First edition
- Authors: Bradley Campbell and Jason Manning
- Language: English
- Publisher: Palgrave Macmillan
- Publication date: 2018
- ISBN: 978-3-319-70328-2 (print edition)

The Rise of Victimhood Culture: Microaggressions, Safe Spaces, and the New Culture Wars, is a 2018 book by sociologists Bradley Campbell and Jason Manning.

== History ==
The book was preceded by a paper entitled Microaggression and Moral Cultures published in the journal Comparative Sociology in 2014.

Campbell and Manning argue that accusations of microaggression focus on unintentional slights, unlike the civil rights movement, which focused on concrete injustices. They argue that the purpose of calling attention to microaggressions is to elevate the status of offended victim. "When the victims publicize microaggressions,” wrote Campbell and Manning “they call attention to what they see as the deviant behavior of the offenders. In doing so,” they “also call attention to their own victimization.” They do this because it lowers “the offender’s moral status” and “raises the moral status of the victims.”

== Thesis ==
In both the paper and the book, Manning and Campbell draw on the work of sociologist Donald Black on conflict and on cross-cultural studies of conflict and morality to argue that the contemporary culture wars resemble tactics described by scholars in which an aggrieved party or group seeks the support of third parties. They argue that grievance-based conflicts have led to large-scale moral change in which an emergent victimhood culture is clashing with and replacing older honor and dignity cultures.

Honour cultures, often called honour-shame cultures, are cultures like that of the American West or Europe in the era when dueling was common. In such cultures, honour is paramount and when it is infringed upon the offended party retaliates directly. Dispute mechanisms include blood feuds. In honor cultures, victims have a low moral status.

Manning and Campbell describe honour-shame culture as having been replaced in the modern Western societies in the 19th and 20th century by a dignity culture where “insults might provoke offense, but they no longer have the same importance as a way of establishing or destroying a reputation for bravery.” Instead, “When intolerable conflicts do arise, dignity cultures prescribe direct but non-violent actions.” In such a culture, instead of challenging the offender to a duel, an aggrieved party might “exercise covert avoidance, quietly cutting off relations with the offender without any confrontation” or “conceptualize the problem as a disruption to their relationship and seek only to restore harmony without passing judgment.” Legal action was taken, “For offenses like theft, assault, or breach of contract, people in a dignity culture will use law without shame,... “But in keeping with their ethic of restraint and toleration, it is not necessarily their first resort, and they might condemn many uses of the authorities as frivolous. People might even be expected to tolerate serious but accidental personal injuries.”

A dignity culture, according to Campbell and Manning, has moral values and behavioral norms that promote the value of every human life, encouraging achievement in its children while teaching that "sticks and stones may break my bones, but words will never hurt me."

Because victimhood culture is now claimed to confer the highest moral status on victims, Campbell and Manning argue that it “increases the incentive to publicize grievances.” Injured and offended parties who might once have thrown a punch or filed a lawsuit now appeal for support on social media.

According to Campbell and Manning, victimhood culture engenders “competitive victimhood,” incentivizing even privileged people to claim that they are victims. According to Claire Lehmann, Manning and Campbell's culture of victimhood sees moral worth as largely defined by skin color and membership in a fixed identity group, such as LGBTIQ, Muslims, or indigenous peoples.

== See also ==
- Allyship – English-language neologism used in social justice activism
- Anti-racism – Opposition to racism
- Anti-woke – Political slang
