= Summer school =

School courses during school holidays

Summer school (or summer university) is a school, or a program generally sponsored by a school or a school district, or provided by a private company, that provides lessons and activities during the summer vacation. Participation in summer schools has been shown to have substantial beneficial effects on education.

== In North America ==
In elementary and middle school, summer school programs are often used for remedial instruction, though some non-academic day camp programs call themselves summer school.

In high school, college or university, students can enroll in classes for credit to be taken into account in their grade point average or their transcript. In high school, summer school is usually used for remediation purposes. However, in colleges and universities, it has historically been used as advancement in credit hours for the purpose of professionalization and career development. Many universities offer shorter and more intensive summer courses to attract both local and international students, and these programs are often surrounded by social activities.

In academia, the term can also refer to a type of conference. Typically, established academics will give presentations on advanced topics in a field to postgraduate students. This type of summer school is often organized at a national or international level, and no credits are awarded. Also, a college or university sometimes offers a summer program for teachers or other professional workers wishing to round out their professional or general education. Some summer schools are for the general public involving no examinations and are not for degree purposes.

== Rest of the world ==
Outside North America, the term has a broader definition and refers to all ages and includes leisure and other non-academic subjects, so, for example, a course on hedge-laying is probably targeting older adults. In these regions, Music Summer Schools, on the other hand, may be designed for school age students, college students, or adult professionals or amateurs at various levels of attainment.

Summer schools can also provide students with educational experiences that would not be available to them within their normal schooling. This may encompass subjects that are not conventionally offered in schools (such as law, which is not usually offered in UK schools but may be taught in summer schools), or the experience of studying in an ancient university or a university or college that has a strong reputation on the global stage, such as the University of Oxford. Summer schools may also incorporate a wider variety of excursions and fields trips than would be possible in day-to-day education, so that some summer schools straddle the line between education and holiday. Summer schools help students get ahead in the competitive environment of university applications and their careers.

== English as a foreign language ==
Summer schools are a popular choice for students of English as a Foreign Language, particularly children. EnglishUK, the language teaching organisation for EFL in the UK, has more than 470 members, many of which operate summer schools. Summer schools often offer foreign language immersion, which has known benefits for language learning. Summer schools of this kind also hold appeal for students wishing to pursue higher education in English-speaking countries, which consistently top university league tables and get a high percentage of their students from overseas, as summer schools in these countries provide insight not only into the English language, but also into the cultures that use it. They may even provide guidance for such students in their university applications.

== See also ==
- Summer camp
- Summer learning loss
- Junior State of America Summer School
- List of summer schools of linguistics
- Year-round school in the United States
