= Fobazi Ettarh =

American academic (1989–2026)

- Born: 1989; New Jersey, U.S.
- Died: January 28, 2026 (aged 36–37)

Academic work
- Discipline: Library studies

Fobazi Michelle Ettarh (1989 – January 28, 2026) was an American academic. She served as a librarian at Temple University Libraries, California State University, Dominguez Hills and Rutgers University. Her research focused on inclusion, equity, and diversity in libraries, and her work led her to coin the term "vocational awe."

== Early life and education ==
Ettarh was born in New Jersey, as the child of a pastor, in 1989.

She attended University of Delaware for undergraduate studies, with a degree in English and sociology. She later earned a MLS from Rutgers in 2014 while on the school library media track. She also received a certification to be a school librarian in New Jersey, and served as a school library media specialist for Hawthorne Public Schools in New Jersey. She was a PhD student at University of Illinois Urbana-Champaign from 2022 until her death in 2026.

== Career ==
In 2016, Ettarh created Killing Me Softly: A Game About Microaggressions, an open-access video game. which allows players to navigate through the life of a character who experiences microaggression.

In May 2017, during a panel presentation held at the University of Southern California, Ettarh first used, and coined, the term "vocational awe". She later defined the term, in a January 2018 article within In The Library With The Lead Pipe, as "the set of ideas, values, and assumptions librarians have about themselves and the profession that result in notions that libraries as institutions are inherently good, sacred notions, and therefore beyond critique." The term was embraced by fellow librarians such as Meredith Farkas, who argued that vocational awe was "common in the helping professions" like librarianship and R. David Lankes of Publishers Weekly as putting the "grand mission" of librarians before the well-being of the workforce.

In September 2018, Ettarh wrote the foreword to the Library Juice Press book Pushing the Margins: Women of Color and Intersectionality in LIS.

In January 2019, as part of an American Libraries piece interviewing "front-line librarians", she argued that "mission creep" was a major problem within librarianship, citing the use of Narcan as an example, and saying that librarians should remain specialists in information, not be "stretched thin" in job responsibilities. She also presented at two conferences in 2019 on the topic of vocational awe, first at the Association of College and Research Libraries Conference in April and at the Library Journal Directors' Summit in November 2019. She also gave the keynote speech at the Minnesota Library Association's Academic and Research Libraries Division (ARLD) Day in 2020 and a presentation at the Academic Library Association of Ohio the following year.

When colleges closed due to the COVID-19 pandemic in the United States in March 2020, but left on-campus libraries open, she expressed to Teen Vogue that this decision was unfair to the most vulnerable students who lacked access to technology and library services without physically being on campus. She argued that by leaving the libraries as one of the few open spaces on campus, students could potentially expose themselves to a deadly virus in order to succeed academically. Additionally, she pointed out that this decision prioritized the academic success of students over the health and well-being of library workers. In April 2021, she told Cronkite News "it's too soon to be opening up any buildings, but especially library buildings" and "we’re not actually creating equity by opening the library [...] Those who do not have that access have to now weigh the potential for getting a deadly virus against, "I'm preparing for class," or filling out a job application online. It is just showing how inequitable the system is to have to go to a congregation point in order to continue to be successful in society." In March 2022, Ettarh told Library Journal that the pandemic had "brought home the idea that work can’t love you back".

Ettarh presented the keynote speech at the Connecticut Information Literacy Conference in 2022 and a keynote presentation at the Lake Superior Libraries Symposium the same year. She also presented on the topic of vocational awe at the Politics of Libraries Conference in March 2022 and on the same topic at the Equity, Diversity, and Inclusion symposium hosted by the SJSU School of Information. She also was a presenter at the Social Emotional Librarianship conference, co-hosted by Library Journal and School Library Journal in October 2022, on the topic of advocating for yourself and your staff.

=== Research, librarianship and influence ===
Ettarh's research focused on gap between values of librarianship and the realities for "marginalized librarians and users." Her scholarship also focused on inclusion, equity, and diversity in libraries, including social and organizational privilege, and the notion of vocational awe as related to librarians. She was also involved with the We Here community and talks about "creating communities of color" within libraries which support one other. In 2017, she was selected as a ALA Emerging Leader.

Ettarh's article January 2018 In the Library with the Lead Pipe article received an honorable mention in the 2018 Library Juice Paper Contest and appeared on library science course syllabi. Her article was praised for allowing librarians to talk about the profession with "more honesty". Abby Hargreaves of Book Riot argued that there is "staunch reality" in examining the ALA "Library Bill of Rights", saying it deserves a "sense of awe". She also said that vocational awe should be deconstructed and eliminated "in ourselves and in our customers".

The term "vocational awe" has been used by scholars in articles about music librarianship, theological librarianship, early career librarians, preservation, academic librarians, stress and burnout of library workers, higher education, and other topics. The term has also been used by non-librarians. Cartoonist Alison Bechdel described Dykes to Watch Out For protagonist Mo Testa as falling into "the pitfall of vocational awe, believing that her public library job is a religious calling". Writer John Warner proposed a similar term, institutional awe, derived from vocational awe, referring to when no individual sacrifice is "too great in order to preserve the status quo functioning of the institution."

In May 2020, Ettarh was named as a "mover & shaker" by Library Journal. In March 2021, scholar Zahra Osman said that Ettarh, apart from her scholarly work, often spends time giving interviews with MLIS students covering her perspectives on library leadership.

== Personal life and death ==
Ettarh identified herself as first-generation American, queer, and disabled women of color in a Library Journal profile. She also developed chronic kidney disease as a complication from sickle cell disease which she was born with. She was a self-described "radical librarian".

Ettarh died on January 28, 2026, with a private burial held for her family, with a crowdfunding page hosted by her wife, Elena, to pay for "significant medical and end-of-life expenses.". Following her death, Takoma Park Maryland Library extended their condolences, saying that her legacy "lives on wherever library workers question vocational awe in favor of finding ways to engage more fairly and sustainably with our work." Emily Knox, Ettarh's PhD student advisor at University of Illinois Urbana-Champaign, described her as a "wonderful person" and "brilliant scholar" who had a lasting impact "on the field of library and information science." Visible Minority Librarians of Canada asserted that Ettarh's legacy and memory will live on through her words, work, compassion, and courage, and highlighted Ettarh's writings on "vocational awe," saying it reshaped the understanding of those in the library profession, and reshared her 2018 article defining the concept. Jessica Schomberg of In the Library with the Lead Pipe called Ettarh a "trailblazer" and "fire-starter", noting her two articles in the publication, and those by other authors in the publication citing her concept (vocational awe), and said they would remember her as "one of the great thinkers of her time."

== Selected publications ==
- Ettarh, Fobazi; Vidas, Chris (May 4, 2022). ""The Future of Libraries:" Vocational Awe in a "Post-COVID" World". The Serials Librarian. 82 (1–4): 17–22. doi:10.1080/0361526X.2022.2028501. S2CID 248626034.
- Chiu, Anastasia; Ettarh, Fobazi M.; Ferretti, Jennifer A. (2021). "Not the Shark, but the Water: How Neutrality and Vocational Awe Intertwine to Uphold White Supremacy". In Leung, Sofia Y.; López-McKnight, Jorge R. (eds.). Knowledge Justice: Disrupting Library and Information Studies through Critical Race Theory. Cambridge: MIT Press. pp. 49–71. ISBN 9780262363204.
- Tewell, Eamon; Tobar, Cynthia; Long, Harvey; Ettarh, Fobazi; Castrillo, James (2021). What's In a Name?: What Named Spaces Tell Us About Academic Libraries (PDF). ACRL 2021 Online. Chicago, Illinois: Association of College and Research Libraries. pp. 1–10.
- Fobazi, Ettarh (January 10, 2018). "Vocational Awe and Librarianship: The Lies We Tell Ourselves". In the Library with the Lead Pipe.
- Ettarh, Fobazi (April 4, 2016). "Unpacking the Narrative of Marginalized Groups in Gaming". Scholars Studio Blog. Temple University. Archived from the original on July 16, 2025.
- Ettarh, Fobazi (July 2, 2014). "Making a New Table: Intersectional Librarianship". In the Library with the Lead Pipe. Archived from the original on December 20, 2022.
- Ettarh, Fobazi (November 19, 2013). "Black OR Queer? Life at the Intersection". Hack Library School. Archived from the original on March 15, 2015.
