= List of summer schools of linguistics =

This is a list of summer schools of linguistics.

- Eastern Generative Grammar (The EGG):
  - Romania: Brašov, Romania (2024)
  - Serbia: Novi Sad, Serbia (2023)
  - Czech Republic: Brno, Czech Republic (2022)
  - Online: (2021)
  - Poland: Wrocław, Poland (2019)
  - Hungary: European Summer School in Generative Grammar (EGG) - Debrecen (2014)
- European Summer School in Logic, Language and Information (ESSLLI)
  - Belgium: Leuven, Belgium (2024)
  - Slovenia: Ljubljana, Slovenia (2023)
  - Ireland: Galway, Ireland (2022)
  - Netherlands: Utrecht, Netherlands (2021)
- Germany: Forensic Linguistics Short Course (FLsc) - Düsseldorf (2018–2019, 2021–2024)
- Germany: Summer School on Corpus Phonology - Augsburg (2008)
- Greece: The Crete Summer School of Linguistics (CreteLing) - Rethymno (2017, 2018, 2019, 2022, 2023, 2024)
- Poland: Summer Institute "Languages and Cultures in Contact / in Contrast" - Zakopane (2008)
- Portugal: NOVA - Lisbon Summer School and Graduate Conference in Linguistics - Lisbon
- Portugal: U. Minho - APL Summer School of Linguistics 2015: Experimental Methods in Syntax - Braga
- United Kingdom: International Summer School in Forensic Linguistic Analysis - Birmingham (2000–2010)
- United States: Summer Institute of Linguistics - University of North Dakota (every summer)
- United States: Linguistics Society of America Summer Institutes, held in odd-numbered years, including:
  - Empirical Foundations for Theories of Language - Stanford (2007)
  - Linguistic Structure and Language Ecologies - UC Berkeley (2009)
  - Language in the World - University of Colorado at Boulder (2011)
  - Universality and Variability - University of Michigan (2013)
  - Linguistic Theory in a World of Big Data - University of Chicago (2015)
  - Language Across Space and Time - University of Kentucky (2017)
  - Linguistics in the Digital Era - University of California, Davis (2019)
  - Linguistics as Cognitive Science: universality and variation - University of Massachusetts, Amherst (2023)
- InField (Institute on Field Linguistics and Language Documentation) and its successor CoLang (Institute on Collaborative Language Research), held in even-numbered years, including:
  - United States: InField - University of California, Santa Barbara (2008)
  - United States: InField - University of Oregon (2010)
  - United States: CoLang - University of Kansas (2012)
  - United States: CoLang - University of Texas at Arlington (2014)
  - United States: CoLang - University of Alaska Fairbanks (2016)
  - United States: CoLang - University of Florida (2018)
- Netherlands: Leiden Summer School in Languages and Linguistics - Leiden
- Netherlands: LOT Winter School - Leiden/Amsterdam/Nijmegen/Groningen/Utrecht (fixed rotation)
- Netherlands: LOT Summer School - Leiden/Amsterdam/Nijmegen/Groningen/Utrecht (fixed rotation)
- Netherlands: Utrecht Summer School - Utrecht (2010)
- Norway: International Summer School Oslo - Oslo (2011)
- Russia: NYI Institute of Linguistics, Cognition and Culture - St. Petersburg every summer since 2003
- France: International School in Linguistic Fieldwork (FieldLing) every summer since 2010

== See also ==
- Lists of schools
- List of schools of linguistics
