= List of schools of linguistics =

This is a list of schools in linguistics.

- Columbia School of Linguistics
- Copenhagen School
- Formal linguistics
- Functional linguistics
  - Systemic functional linguistics
  - Sydney School
- Kharkiv Linguistic School
- Lancaster School of Linguistics
- Leiden school
- Leiden University Centre for Linguistics (LUCL)
- London School of Linguistics
- Moscow School of Comparative Linguistics
- Prague linguistic circle
- Structural linguistics
