= Axiom of categoricity =

Controversial tenet of linguistic theory

The axiom of categoricity is a term coined by J. K. Chambers in 1995 to refer to the once-widespread tenet of linguistic theory that in order to properly study language, linguistic data should be removed or abstracted from all real-world context so as to be free of any inconsistencies or variability. This principle was, for different theorists and schools of thought, taken as a prerequisite for linguistic theory, or as a self-evident falsehood to be rejected. It remains an influential idea in linguistics.

== History ==
Ferdinand de Saussure divided language into two categories, langue (the abstract grammatical system a language uses) and parole (language as it is used in real-life circumstances). Historically, the range of language study had been limited to langue, since the data could easily be found in the linguist's own intuitions about language and there was no need to look at the often inconsistent and chaotic language patterns found in everyday society.

In the 20th century, scholars began to further embrace the assumption that linguistic data should be removed from its social, real-life context. Martin Joos stated the axiom this way in 1950:

"We must make our 'linguistics' a kind of mathematics within which inconsistency is by definition impossible." (Joos 1950: 701–2)

In 1965, Noam Chomsky offered a more substantial definition, incorporating his concepts of linguistic competence and linguistic performance, terms that closely parallel Saussure's langue and parole.

"Linguistic theory is concerned primarily with an ideal speaker-listener, in a completely homogeneous speech-community, who knows its language perfectly and is unaffected by such grammatically irrelevant conditions as memory limitations, distractions, shifts of attention and interest, and errors (random or characteristic) in applying his knowledge of the language in actual performance." (Chomsky 1965: 3)

Around this time, several linguistic studies began to acknowledge not only the presence, but importance of variability found in speaker data. Instead of dismissing this variability on the grounds that the variants either belonged to different coexisting linguistic systems or demonstrated unpredictable free variation as had been done before, they recognized that it might be influenced by the speaker's circumstances. Sociologist John L. Fischer conducted one of the first systematic studies of language variation in 1958 to address variation in the speech of New England schoolchildren. Finding free variation to be an unsatisfactory explanation, he wrote:

"...Another sort of explanation is possible in terms of current factors which lead a given child in given circumstances to produce one of the variants rather than another." (Fischer 1958: 47–8)

Fischer eventually discovered a correlation between the linguistic variants and independent social variables such as class and sex. By gathering variable data and analyzing it, he proved that the inconsistencies were indeed manageable, resisting the axiom of categoricity's premise that the data be abstracted from social contexts in order to make it coherent and manageable. By invalidating this premise, it proved that acceptance of the Axiom of categoricity is not a requirement but rather an idealistic option that may or may not be useful to a study. Fischer's work created the basis for sociolinguistic analysis in the coming years, notably William Labov's studies in Martha's Vineyard and New York City during the 1960s.

== Acceptance in modern theory ==
Despite its rejection by some sociolinguists, the axiom of categoricity is still an influential postulate in some schools of linguistics. Chambers claims that all the linguistic progress that was made when the axiom was the law remains successful and indisputable. (Chambers 1995: 12–29)

== See also ==
- Variable rules analysis

== Bibliography ==
- Bakhtin, M. (1986), "The Problem of Speech Genres" ("Проблема речевых жанров"), in: Speech genres and other late essays, Austin: University of Texas Press. Translation: Vern W. McGee.
- Chambers, J.K. (1995), Sociolinguistic Theory, Oxford, England: Blackwell.
- Chomsky, Noam (1965), Aspects of the Theory of Syntax, Cambridge, Massachusetts: MIT Press.
- Fischer, John L. (1958), "Social Influences on the Choice of a Linguistic Variant", Word 14: 47–56.
- Joos, Martin (1950), "Description of Language Design". Journal of the Acoustical Society of America, 22(6): 701–708.
