= Microlinguistics =

Branch of linguistics

Microlinguistics is a branch of linguistics that concerns itself with the study of language systems in the abstract, without regard to the meaning or national content of linguistic expressions. In micro-linguistics, language is reduced to the abstract mental elements of syntax and phonology. It contrasts with macro-linguistics, which includes meanings, and especially with sociolinguistics, which studies how language and meaning function within human social systems. The term micro-linguistics was first used in print by George L. Trager, in an article published in 1949, in Studies in Linguistics: Occasional Papers. The field of microlinguistics has been birthed by and subsequently dominated by Euro-American linguists and sociologists. The heart of microlinguistics is often summed up by Sausurre's claim that “The fundamental idea of this course: linguistics has for unique and true object the language considered in itself and for itself.”
