= List of Mofet schools =

This is an incomplete list of Israeli schools teaching courses and/or working according to the Mofet educational program, and their location:

- Hakfar Hayarok school – Ramat HaSharon
- Zevulun Hammer school – Rehovot
- Kfar Silver school – Ashkelon
- Branco Weiss school – Beit Shemesh
- First school – Beit Shemesh
- Osafia middle school – Daliyat Al-Karmel
- Koftan Halaby school – Daliyat Al-Karmel
- Rodman high school – Kiryat Yam
- Rodman middle school – Kiryat Yam
- Rabin high school – Kiryat Yam
- Rabin middle school – Kiryat Yam
- Hadassim school – Netanya
- Neve Hadasa school – Hof HaSharon Regional Council
- Nofey Golan High School – Golan Regional Council
- Meir Shfeya high school – Hof HaCarmel Regional Council
- Yirka middle school – Yirka
- Yigal Allon ORT school – Yokneam Illit
- Mughar Comprehensive A – Maghar
- Mughar Comprehensive B – Maghar
- Mughar Middle School A – Maghar
- Mughar Middle School B – Maghar
- Rogozin ORT school – Migdal HaEmek
- Rogozin ORT middle school – Migdal HaEmek
- Yaarat Haemek middle school – Migdal HaEmek
- Sharett high school – Nazareth Illit
- Sharett middle school – Nazareth Illit
- Yigal Allon ORT school – Nazareth Illit
- Yigal Allon ORT middle school – Nazareth Illit
- Brosh middle school – Afula
- Sakhnin middle school A – Sakhnin
- Sakhnin middle school B – Sakhnin
- ORT Afridar school – Ashkelon
- Gutwirth middle school – Sderot

== Sources ==
- content/blogsection/5/6/ List of Mofet schools participating in the Atidim program (in Hebrew)
