= Marguerite Sechehaye =

- Born: September 27, 1887; Switzerland
- Died: June 1, 1964 (aged 76); Geneva, Switzerland
- Education: University of Geneva; Rousseau Institute
- Known for: Pioneering contributions to the study of schizophrenia
- Scientific career
- Fields: Psychotherapy

Marguerite A. Sechehaye (French: [sɛʃə.ɛ]; née Burdet; September 27, 1887 – June 1, 1964) was a Swiss psychotherapist. A pioneer in the psychoanalytic treatment of people with schizophrenia, she developed the symbolic realization method for treating psychotic patients. The approach was rooted in psychoanalytic and existential theory.

== Life ==
Sechehaye was raised in a Protestant family and, as was common at the time, attended a single-sex school. She studied at the University of Geneva where she attended lectures by Ferdinand de Saussure on linguistics. Her notes from these lectures assisted Charles Bally and her husband, Albert Sechehaye, to develop Course in General Linguistics. After graduating Sechehaye studied at the Rousseau Institute, where she worked as the assistant of Édouard Claparède, and later went on to establish her own practice based on the encouragement of Raymond de Saussure.

Sechehaye followed the work of Sigmund Freud and Jean Piaget closely, believing there was a link between psychosis and trauma experienced as a child. One of her most notable cases was undertaken with a psychotic patient referred to as "Renée", a pseudonym used for Louisa Düss, (Note: Sometimes spelled Duess or Duss in accounts, but captured as Düss in Sechehaye's personal papers held at the Bibliothèque de Genève.) whom the Sechehayes eventually adopted. Over the course of their work together, Sechehaye took the unique approach of chronicling Düss' journal entries and personal reflections in tandem with her own clinical commentary. The approach significantly influenced mental illness research by introducing an antipsychiatry framework that positioned patients' experiences as a valid means of establishing their case histories. As a result of this work, the book Autobiography of a Schizophrenic Girl: The True Story of "Renee" (1951) was published, highlighting the most memorable aspects of the disease.

Sechehaye's work was of particular interest to psychiatrist R. D. Laing who referenced three of her books in The Divided Self: An Existential Study in Sanity and Madness.

Sechehaye died on June 1, 1964, in Geneva.

== Selected works ==
- Reality lost and regained; autobiography of a schizophrenic girl; with analytic interpretation. New York: Grune & Stratton. 1951. OCLC 840116751.
- Symbolic realization; a new method of psychotherapy applied to a case of schizophrenia. New York: International Universities Press. OCLC 751744.
- A new psychotherapy in schizophrenia; relief of frustrations by symbolic realization. New York: Grune & Stratton. 1956. OCLC 1626312.
