= Sergei Kartsevski =

Russian linguist (1884–1955)

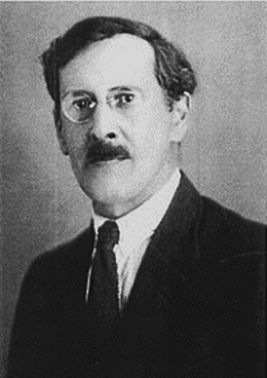
- Born: Sergei Iosifovich Kartsevski; 28 August [O.S. 6 August] 1884; Tobolsk, Russian Empire
- Died: 7 November 1955 (aged 71); Geneva, Switzerland

Academic background
- Education: University of Geneva

Academic work
- Discipline: Linguistics
- School or tradition: Geneva School; Prague linguistic circle

Sergei Iosifovich Kartsevski (Russian: Сергей Иосифович Карцевский; French: Serge Karcevski; 28 August 1884 – 7 November 1955) was a Russian linguist who was a representative of the Geneva and Prague school of linguistics.

== Biography ==
Kartsevski was born in Tobolsk in 1884. In 1903 he graduated as a teacher; a year later he was appointed curator at the Library in Nizhny Novgorod.

A member of the Socialist-Revolutionary Party from 1905, he was arrested in Moscow for his revolutionary activities. After spending a year in prison he escaped and joined the Russian refugee community in Geneva in 1908, at the age of 24. In Geneva Kartsevsky met and was a student of the linguists Ferdinand de Saussure, Charles Bally, Albert Sechehaye and Bernard Bouvier. He was a student of Bally until the year of his graduation in 1914.

In addition to problems in general linguistics and Russian linguistics, he spent a lot of time studying Russian literature. In 1910 he took part in a competition for young Russian writers and won the prize of 2,000 gold rubles with his story Kolka. He was also interested in the study of children's pedagogy of which Geneva later became a world center, thanks to the foundation of the Rousseau Institute in 1912.

Kartsevski returned to Moscow in March 1917, where he participated in the work of the Moscow linguistic circle, affiliated with the Dialectology Commission associated with the Academy of Sciences; there he met the linguists Roman Jakobson and Antoine Meillet. He exposed Ferdinand de Saussure 's theories to his colleagues and applied his precepts to the study of contemporary Russian. In March and May 1918, during the sessions of the Circle, Karcevsky presented the nucleus of his future Système du verbe russe in a synchronic essay.

In 1919 he moved to Strasbourg, where he obtained a position as a lecturer in Russian at the university thanks to the help of A. Meillet. True to his teaching profession, he created a Russian linguistic educational newspaper, Russkaja škola za rubežom ('Russian School Abroad'), which was widely used in Russian schools abroad.

In 1927 he supported his doctoral thesis at the University of Geneva, where he founded the Institute of Slavic Studies in 1928 and directed it until 1936. In 1928, Kartsevski, Jakobson and Trubetzkoy were the first three signatories of the "Manifesto" for the creation of the Prague linguistic circle.

He taught in Geneva until 1954. Kartsevski was Chairman of the Union of Soviet Citizens of Switzerland. In 1955 he received permission to enter the Soviet Union and began to prepare for departure, but died six months before the scheduled date on November 7, 1955.
