= Geneva school (linguistics) =

School of linguistics

The Geneva School was a school of linguistics that emphasized the structural and functional aspects of language. It developed at the beginning of the 20th century.

== History ==
The most prominent figure of the Geneva School was Ferdinand de Saussure. Other important colleagues and students of Saussure who comprise this school include Albert Sechehaye, Albert Riedlinger, Sergei Kartsevski and Charles Bally.

=== Saussure ===
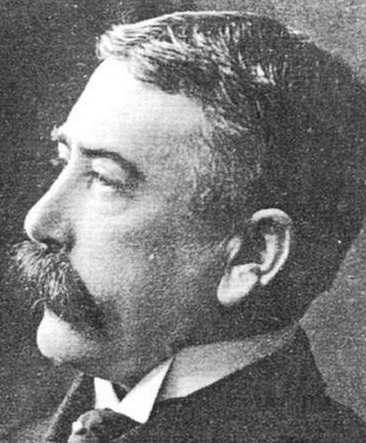
Ferdinand de Saussure

The most significant linguistic book connected with this school is Cours de linguistique générale (1916), the main work of de Saussure, which was published by his students Charles Bally and Albert Sehechaye. The book was based on lectures with this title that de Saussure gave three times in Geneva from 1906 to 1912. Sehechaye and Bally did not themselves take part in these lecture classes, but they used notes from other students. The most important of these students was Albert Riedlinger, who provided them with the most material. Furthermore, Bally and Sehechaye continued to develop de Saussure's theories, mainly focusing on the linguistic research of speech. Sehechaye also concentrated on syntactic problems.

=== Bally ===
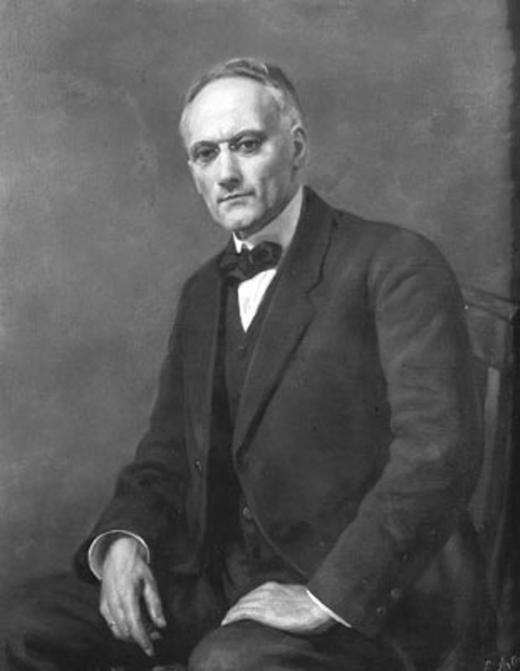
Charles Bally

In addition to his edition of de Saussure's lectures, Charles Bally also played an important role in linguistics. He lived from 1865 to 1947 and was, like de Saussure, from Switzerland. His parents were Jean Gabriel, a teacher and Henriette, the owner of a cloth store. Bally was married three times: first with Valentine Leirens, followed by Irma Baptistine Doutre, who was sent into a mental institution in 1915 and Alice Bellicot.

From 1883 to 1885 he studied classic language and literature in Geneva. He continued his studies from 1886 to 1889 in Berlin where he was awarded a PhD. After his studies he worked as a private teacher for the royal family of Greece from 1889 to 1893. Bally returned to Geneva and taught at a business school from 1893 on and moved to the Progymnasium, a grammar school, from 1913 to 1939. At the same time, he worked as PD at the university from 1893 to 1913. Finally from 1913 to 1939 he had a professorship for general linguistic and comparative Indo-German studies which he took over from Ferdinand de Saussure.

Besides his works about subjectivity in the French Language he also wrote about the crisis in French language and language classes. Today Charles Bally is regarded as the founding-father of linguistic theories of style and much honored for his theories of phraseology.
