= Arbitrariness =

Not being determined by reason

Arbitrariness is the quality of being "determined by chance, whim, or impulse, and not by necessity, reason, or principle". It is also used to refer to a choice made without any specific criterion or restraint.

Arbitrary decisions are not necessarily the same as random decisions. For example, during the 1973 oil crisis, Americans were allowed to purchase gasoline only on odd-numbered days if their license plate was odd, and on even-numbered days if their license plate was even. The system was well-defined and not random in its restrictions; however, since license plate numbers are completely unrelated to a person's fitness to purchase gasoline, it was still an arbitrary division of people. Similarly, schoolchildren are often organized by their surname in alphabetical order, a non-random yet an arbitrary method—at least in cases where surnames are irrelevant.

== Philosophy ==
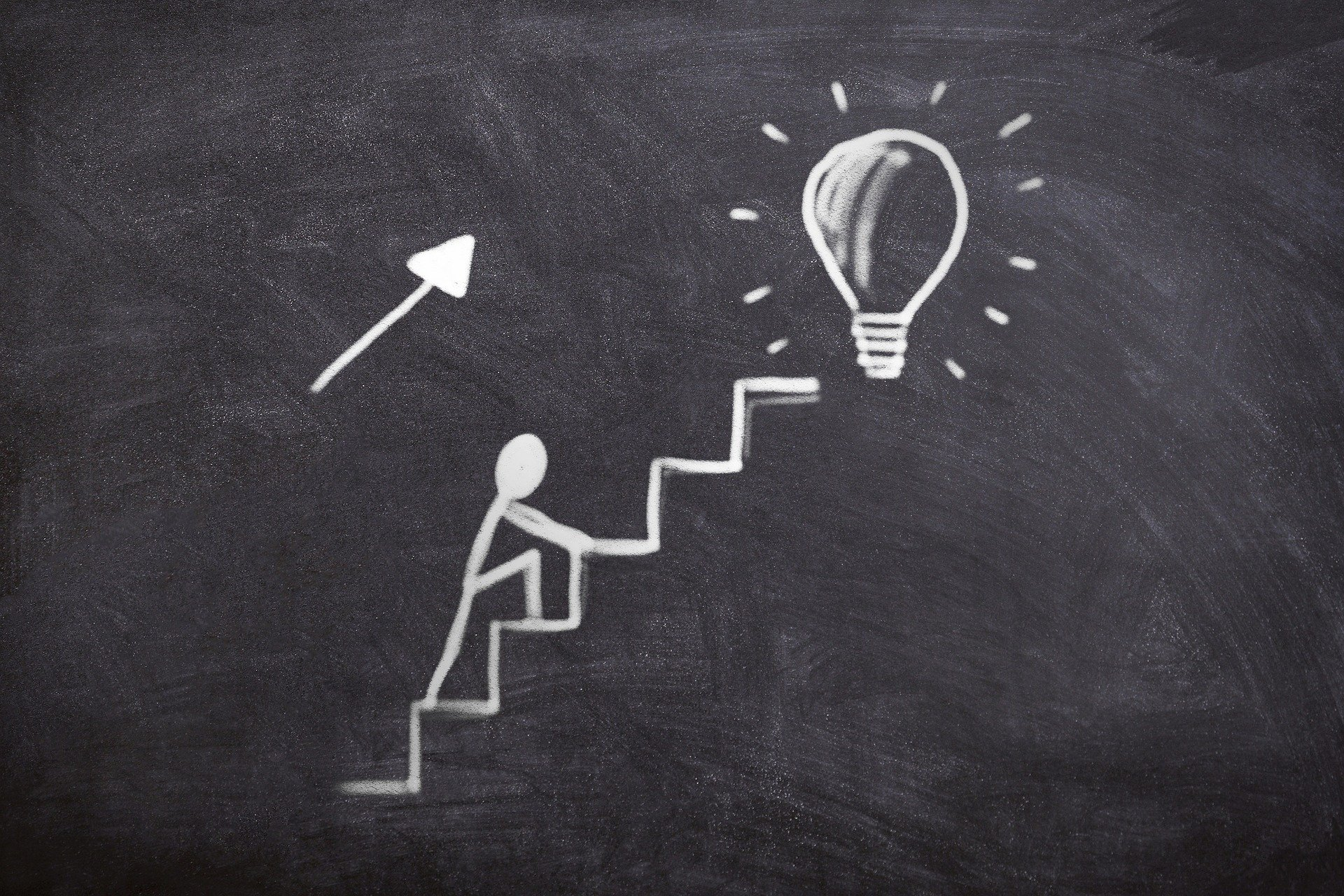
A person climbing a staircase towards a goal, which is a telos

Arbitrary actions are closely related to teleology, the study of purpose. Actions lacking a telos, a goal, are necessarily arbitrary. With no end to measure against, there can be no standard applied to choices, so all decisions are alike. Note that arbitrary or random methods in the standard sense of arbitrary may not qualify as arbitrary choices philosophically if they were done in furtherance of a larger purpose (such as the examples above for the purposes of establishing discipline in school and avoiding overcrowding at gas stations).

Nihilism is the philosophy that believes that there is no purpose in the universe, and that every choice is arbitrary. According to nihilism, the universe contains no value and is essentially meaningless. Because the universe and all of its constituents contain no higher goal for us to make subgoals from, all aspects of human life and experiences are completely arbitrary. There is no right or wrong decision, thought or practice and whatever choice a human being makes is just as meaningless and empty as any other choice they could have made.

Many brands of theism, the belief in a deity or deities, believe that everything has a purpose and that nothing is arbitrary. In these philosophies, God created the universe for a reason, and every event flows from that. Even seemingly random events cannot escape God's hand and purpose. This is somewhat related to the argument from design—the argument for God's existence because a purpose can be found in the universe.

Arbitrariness is also related to ethics, the philosophy of decision-making. Even if a person has a goal, they may choose to attempt to achieve it in ways that may be considered arbitrary. Rationalism holds that knowledge comes about through intellectual calculation and deduction; many rationalists apply this to ethics as well. All decisions should be made through reason and logic, not via whim or how one "feels" what is right. Randomness may occasionally be acceptable as part of a subtask in furtherance of a larger goal, but not in general.

In semiotics, the general theory of signs, sign systems and sign processes, Saussure introduced the notion of arbitrariness according to which there is no necessary connection between the material sign (or signifier) and the entity it refers to or denotes as its meaning (or signified) as a mental concept or real object.

== Linguistics ==
The principle of semiotic arbitrariness (introduced by Ferdinand de Saussure in his Course in General Linguistics) is the idea that social convention is what imbues meaning to a given semiosis (any activity, conduct, or process that involves signs, including the production of meaning) or sign.

== Mathematics ==
The symbol of a universal quantifier

A logical symbol is a fundamental concept in logic, tokens of which may be marks or a configuration of marks forming a particular pattern.

In mathematics, arbitrary corresponds to the term "every" and the universal quantifier $\forall$, as in an arbitrary division of a set or an arbitrary permutation of a sequence. Its use implies generality and that a statement does not only apply to special cases, but to every available choice. For example, one might say that:

"Given an arbitrary integer, multiplying it by two will result in an even number."

Even further, the implication of the use of "arbitrary" is that generality will hold—even if an opponent were to choose the item in question. In which case, arbitrary can be regarded as synonymous to worst-case.

== Law ==
Arbitrary comes from the Latin arbitrarius, the source of arbiter; someone who is tasked to judge some matter. An arbitrary legal judgment is a decision made at the discretion of the judge, not one that is fixed by law. In some countries, a prohibition of arbitrariness is enshrined into the constitution. Article 9 of the Swiss Federal Constitution theoretically overrides even democratic decisions in prohibiting arbitrary government action. The US Supreme Court has overturned laws for having "no rational basis." A recent study of the U.S. asylum system suggests that arbitrariness in decision-making might be the cause of large disparities in outcomes between different adjudicators, a phenomenon described as refugee roulette.

Article 330 of the Russian penal code defines arbitrariness as a specific crime, but with a very broad definition encompassing any "actions contrary to the order presented by a law".

== See also ==
- Existential nihilism
- Iconicity
- Metaphysical nihilism
- Randomness
