= Linguistic turn =

Early-20th-century development in Western philosophy

The linguistic turn was a major development in Western philosophy during the early 20th century, the most important characteristic of which is the focusing of philosophy primarily on the relations between language, language users, and the world.

The Linguistic Turn constitutes a significant component of the radical critiques that began to dominate debates in historical thought from the 1970s onward, challenging the fundamental assumptions of modern historiography. This approach emphasizes the central role of language and discourse in the formation of societies, asserting that social structures are not fixed determinants of a culture or community but rather products linguistically constructed by a communicative collective.

Very different intellectual movements were associated with the "linguistic turn", although the term itself is commonly thought to have been popularised by Richard Rorty's 1967 anthology The Linguistic Turn, in which he discusses the turn towards linguistic philosophy. According to Rorty, who later dissociated himself from linguistic philosophy and analytic philosophy generally, the phrase "the linguistic turn" originated with philosopher Gustav Bergmann.

== Analytic philosophy ==
Traditionally, the linguistic turn is taken to also mean the birth of analytic philosophy. One of the results of the linguistic turn was an increasing focus on logic and philosophy of language, and the cleavage between ideal language philosophy and ordinary language philosophy.

=== Frege ===
According to Michael Dummett, the linguistic turn can be dated to Gottlob Frege's 1884 work The Foundations of Arithmetic, specifically paragraph 62 where Frege explores the identity of a numerical proposition.

In order to answer a Kantian question about numbers, "How are numbers given to us, granted that we have no idea or intuition of them?" Frege invokes his "context principle", stated at the beginning of the book, that only in the context of a proposition do words have meaning, and thus finds the solution to be in defining "the sense of a proposition in which a number word occurs." Thus an ontological and epistemological problem, traditionally solved along idealist lines, is instead solved along linguistic ones.

=== Russell and Wittgenstein ===
This concern for the logic of propositions and their relationship to "facts" was later taken up by the notable analytic philosopher Bertrand Russell in "On Denoting", and played a weighty role in his early work in logical atomism.

Ludwig Wittgenstein, an associate of Russell, was one of the progenitors of the linguistic turn. This follows from his ideas in his Tractatus Logico-Philosophicus that philosophical problems arise from a misunderstanding of the logic of language, and from his remarks on language games in his later work.

=== Quine and Kripke ===
W. V. O. Quine describes the historical continuity of the linguistic turn with earlier philosophy in "Two Dogmas of Empiricism": "Meaning is what essence becomes when it is divorced from the object of reference and wedded to the word."

Later in the twentieth century, philosophers like Saul Kripke in Naming and Necessity drew metaphysical conclusions from closely analyzing language.

== Continental philosophy ==
=== Structuralism and post-structuralism ===
In continental philosophy, thinkers like Ferdinand de Saussure, Jacques Derrida, and Michel Foucault emphasized that meaning is shaped by linguistic structures and discourses rather than inherent truths.

This intellectual trajectory is rooted in Ferdinand de Saussure’s Course in General Linguistics, which posits that language functions as a closed and autonomous system. According to Saussure, meaning arises from the internal network of differences within language itself; individuals do not use language merely to convey pre-existing thoughts—rather, thought is shaped and constituted by language.

This conception was further radicalized by post-structuralist theorists such as Jacques Derrida and Paul de Man. For them, language does not refer to reality but instead constructs it. As Derrida famously asserted, “there is nothing outside of the text.” Within this framework, texts are independent of authorial intention; meaning is never fixed but perpetually deferred—a process Derrida termed différance.

Michel Foucault, by centering the relationship between knowledge and power, argued that historical discourses define what is regarded as “true” or “legitimate” knowledge within particular periods. For Foucault, knowledge itself is a form of power, and linguistic discourses delineate the invisible boundaries of social order.

== See also ==
- Aretaic turn
- Cultural turn
- Critical theory
- Deconstruction
- Discourse analysis
- Formal semantics (natural language)
- Historical turn
- Semiotics
- Structural linguistics
