= Léon Chertok =

French psychiatrist (1911–1991)

Léon Chertok or Lejb Tchertok (31 October 1911 in Vilnius, Vilna Governorate – 6 July 1991 in Deauville), was a French psychiatrist known for his work on hypnosis and psychosomatic medicine.

== Biography ==
Chertok obtained his doctorate in medicine in Prague in 1938. He came to Paris in 1939, and joined the French Resistance. He was awarded the Croix de Guerre. In 1947 he worked in a psychiatric ward at Mount Sinai Hospital in New York, in a psychosomatic unit directed by the psychoanalyst Lawrence Kubie. When back in France he underwent analysis with Jacques Lacan from 1948 until 1954. From 1948 to 1949 he worked as an assistant for Marcel Montassut at the psychiatric hospital in Villejuif. In 1950 he organized the center for psychosomatic medicine at Villejuif, with Victor Gachkel; also visited by Franz Alexander. During this period he did voluntary work under the urologist Pierre Aboulker. In the 1950s he went to the USA and let himself be hypnotized by Milton Erickson, and in Germany by Johannes Heinrich Schultz. It was at this time that he met the psychoanalyst Raymond de Saussure and the specialist on animal magnetism Robert Amadou. In 1957 he took part in the founding of the French society of psychosomatic medicine, with Michel Sapir and Pierre Aboulker. In 1959, he gave his first lecture on hypnosis for psychoanalysts under the auspices of Henri Ey's society L'évolution psychiatrique. The end of the 1970s and the 1980s was marked by his exchanges with philosophers such as François Roustang, Mikkel Borch-Jacobsen, Michel Henry and Isabelle Stengers.

Chertok found that the psychoanalysts neglected the practice and phenomenon of hypnosis, and thus made himself an object of fierce criticism from their side. He underwent, as mentioned, analysis with Jacques Lacan, and was a student of Francis Pasche, but he was not accepted as a member of the Societe Psychanalytique de Paris. Chertok also had some contact with Soviet psychiatrists. His position as a "heretic" led to his isolation and to the neglect of his ideas concerning hypnosis, thus favoring the Ericksonian school. In the books and papers he wrote in collaboration with Isabelle Stengers Chertok repeatedly criticized traditional psychoanalysis and its institutions.

== Works ==
- Psychosomatic methods in painless childbirth, 1959
- Hypnosis, 1966
- Psychophysical mechanisms of hypnosis, 1969
- Psychotherapeutic action of doctors, 1973
- The therapeutic revolution - from Mesmer to Freud, 1979, with Raymond de Saussure
- Sense and Nonsense in Psychotherapy: Challenge of Hypnosis, 1981
