= Mikkel Borch-Jacobsen =

French philosopher (born 1951)

- Born: 1951 (age 74–75)
- Awards: 1987 – Prix de la Psyché; 1994 – The Salomon Katz Distinguished Lectureship in the Humanities; 1997 – Gradiva Award
- Scientific career
- Fields: Comparative Literature
- Workplaces: University of Washington, Seattle

Mikkel Borch-Jacobsen (born 1951) is a professor of Comparative Literature and French at the University of Washington in Seattle, and the author of many works on the history and philosophy of psychiatry, psychoanalysis and hypnosis. Born to Danish parents, he began his studies in France and emigrated to the United States in 1986. His constructivist analysis of the co-production of psychical "facts" emphasises the accuracy of historical accounts of mental disorders.

Borch-Jacobsen is known for his positions in the controversies surrounding psychoanalysis, especially with regard to the 2005 publication of Le Livre noir de la psychanalyse ("The Black Book of Psychoanalysis") to which he was a major contributor. In a review of Borch-Jacobsen's book Folies à plusieurs. De l'hystérie à la dépression ("Many madnesses. From hysteria to depression"), Pierre-Henri Castel calls him "one of the most prominent polemicists of the Freud Wars".

== Biography ==
Borch-Jacobsen studied philosophy with Philippe Lacoue-Labarthe and Jean-Luc Nancy, two philosophers close in thought to, and in dialogue with, Jacques Derrida and Jacques Lacan.

In 1981 at the University of Strasbourg he submitted his doctoral dissertation on The Freudian Subject and then began teaching in the department of Psychoanalysis at Vincennes University in Paris, where Jacques Lacan had first made his mark.

In 1986 he emigrated to the United States.

== Criticism of psychoanalysis ==
=== Hypnosis ===
In 1983, Borch-Jacobsen participated in a meeting on the subject of hypnosis at the Hôpital Fernand-Widal where he joined such other as Léon Chertok, René Girard and François Roustang in the discussion of hypnosis. The following year, he published with Éric Michaud and Jean-Luc Nancy, Hypnoses. In this book, the authors consider the whole history of therapeutic hypnosis, the psychological or sociological theory becoming suspect to dangerous regressions from intellectual, ethical and political ideas.

On 21 January 1985, he presented a conference paper entitled "L'hypnose dans la psychanalyse" ("Hypnosis in psychoanalysis") to the Society of Psychosomatic Medicine. The text of this paper was then published in collaboration with Chertok in 1987, with replies from many psychoanalysists, philosophers and sociologists, such as Georges Lapassade, Octave Mannoni and Franklin Rausky.

In this paper, Borch-Jacobsen presented evidence that psychoanalytic transference is a form of altered state of consciousness, comparable with those that had existed in the work of psychotherapies which predate psychoanalysis, from Shamanism to the hypnotism of the Nancy School, by way of animal magnetism. He averred that "le phénomène du transfert n'est rien d'autre, de l'aveu même de Freud, que le resurgissement, au sein du dispositif analytique, de la relation (du « rapport ») caractéristique du dispositif hypnotique : dépendance, soumission ou encore... valorisation exclusive de la personne du médecin" ("The phenomenon of transference is, by Freud's own admission, nothing other than the resurgence, at the heart of the [psycho analytical] technique, of the relation (of the 'rapport') characteristic of the hypnotic technique: dependence, submission, or again... exclusive valorization of the figure of the doctor"). He emphasised that there is consequently an important risk of suggestion on the part of the psychoanalyst, even more so when the psychoanalyst himself is not conscious of these phenomena.

Borch-Jacobsen then reaffirmed that Sigmund Freud, after having started to use the suggestive hypnotic psychotherapy of Hippolyte Bernheim in 1887, replaced it with the cathartic method in 1899, no longer using hypnosis as a means of direct suggestion, but to bring out suppressed feelings of patients' traumas. After practicing using free association in 1892, Freud totally abandoned hypnosis at the end of 1896. This is explained in the following manner by Chertok: "Par opposition à l'hypnose, Freud avait cru fonder une psychothérapie scientifique, destinée, comme telle, à devenir la psychothérapie par excellence. L'interprétation et la prise de conscience y constituaient le pivot de la cure. L'affectivité ne pouvait certes pas être éliminée de la nouvelle méthode mais elle se trouvait canalisée dans le transfert, et par là, dominée et mise au service de la connaissance. Telle était l'ambition du fondateur de la psychanalyse, en cette fin de siècle encore toute imprégnée d'esprit positiviste" ("In his opposition to hypnosis, Freud was known to have founded a scientific psychotherapy, destined, as such, to become the psychotherapy par excellence. The interpretation and awareness thus became the fulcrum of the cure. Affectivity certainly could not be eliminated from the new method, but it comes to be channelled into transference, and thereby, controlled and put in service of knowledge. Such was the ambition of the founder of psychoanalysis [Freud], at the turn of the century which was still very much filled with the spirit of Positivism"). It is precisely this posture of Freud's that the consciousness is "dominating" that was put into question by Borch-Jacobsen.

Bertrand Méheust rebuked Borch-Jacobsen for accepting without further discussion a dated view of hypnotherapy, bequeathed by the positivist institutional medicine of the 19th century. Furthermore, he argues that hypnosis follows a state of absolute passivity and therefore hurts well-being, and that hypnosis is induced in someone in which all consciousness is disconnected, a being totally immersed in the inner self, indeed a puppet who thinks and lives totally by the workings of another. He takes sides with Puységur and Deleuze, stating that lucid, magnetic phenomena are assumed to establish a kind of synergy between the higher functions of intelligence and the immediacy of instinct.

=== The case of Anna O. ===
In 1996 he completed a treatise on the case of Bertha Pappenheim, "Anna O.", subtitled Une mystification centenaire ("A 100-year-old mystification"), in which, according to Claude Meyer, he "met un terme à l'un des mythes fondateurs de la psychanalyse" ("put an end to one of the founding myths of psychoanalysis"). It is also the opinion of Elizabeth Loentz, who had also written a book on Pappenheim, and Paul Roazen, who considers this work a major stage of university and historiographical work on psychoanalysis, and a fly in the ointment of the "defenders of the status quo".

== Publications ==
- Le Sujet freudien ("The Freudian Subject"), Flammarion, 1982 (revised in 1992).
- Hypnoses (with Éric Michaud and Jean-Luc Nancy), Galilée, 1984.
- Hypnose et psychanalyse ("Hypnosis and psychoanalysis") (with Léon Chertok), Dunod, 1987.
- Lacan, le maître absolu ("Lacan, the absolute master"), Stanford University Press, 1991.
- Le lien affectif ("The Emotional Tie"), Aubier Montaigne, 1992.
- Souvenirs d'Anna O.: une mystification centenaire ("Memoirs of Anna O.: A 100-year old mystery"), 1996.
  - Remembering Anna O: A Century of Mystification. London: Routledge. ISBN 0-415-91777-8 1996
- Folies à plusieurs : de l'hystérie à la dépression ("Many madnesses: from hysteria to depression"), Les Empêcheurs de penser en rond, 2002.
- Constructivisme et psychanalyse ("Constructivism and psychoanalysis") (with Bernard Granger, debates with Georges Fischman), Le Cavalier Bleu, 2005.
- Le Livre noir de la psychanalyse ("The Black Book of Psychoanalysis") (with Jean Cottraux, Jacques Van Rillaer, Didier Pleux) (Catherine Meyer, ed.), Les Arènes, 2005.
- Le dossier Freud. Enquête sur l'histoire de la psychoanalyse ("Freud's dossier. An inquiry on the history of psychoanalysis") (co-authored with Sonu Shamdasani), Les Empêcheurs de penser en rond, 2006.
- Making Minds and Madness: From Hysteria to Depression, Cambridge University Press, 2009.
- Les Patients de Freud: Destins, Éditions Sciences Humaines, 2011.
- The Freud Files: An Inquiry into the History of Psychoanalysis (co-authored with Sonu Shamdasani). Cambridge University Press, 2012.
- Freud's Patients: A Book of Lives, Reaktion Books, 2021. Expanded edition of Les Patients de Freud: Destins, translated into English by Andrew Brown.

== Awards ==
- 1987 – Prix de la Psyché (awarded by the Association Française d'études et de Recherches Psychiatriques)
- 1994 – The Salomon Katz Distinguished Lectureship in the Humanities, University of Washington
- 1997 – Gradiva Award for Best General Book (awarded by the National Association for the Advancement of Psychoanalysis).
