= Metaphysical nihilism =

Philosophical theory

Metaphysical nihilism is the philosophical theory that there might have been no objects at all—that is, that there is a possible world in which there are no objects at all; or at least that there might have been no concrete objects at all, so that even if every possible world contains some objects, there is at least one that contains only abstract objects.

To understand metaphysical nihilism, one can look to the subtraction theory in its simplest form, proposed by Thomas Baldwin.

1. There could have been finitely many things.
2. For each thing, that thing might not have existed.
3. The removal of one thing does not necessitate the introduction of another.
4. Therefore, there could have been no things at all.

The idea is that there is a possible world with finitely many things. One can thus get another possible world by taking a single thing away, and one does not need to add any other thing as its replacement. Then one can take another thing away, and another, until one is left with a possible world that is empty.

Against the possible strength of this intuitive argument, some philosophers argue that there are necessarily some concrete objects. It is a consequence of David Kellogg Lewis's concrete modal realism that it is impossible that no concrete objects exist; for since worlds are concrete, there is at least one concrete object—the world itself—at each world. E. J. Lowe has likewise argued that there are necessarily some concrete objects. His argument runs as follows: Necessarily, there are some abstract objects, such as numbers. The only possible abstract objects are sets or universals, but both of these depend on the existence of concrete objects (for sets, their members; for universals, the things that instantiate them). Therefore, there are necessarily some concrete objects.

== See also ==
- Why is there anything at all?
