= Raymond de Saussure =

Swiss psychoanalyst (1894–1971)

- Born: August 2, 1894; Genthod, Switzerland
- Died: October 29, 1971 (aged 77); Geneva, Switzerland
- Father: Ferdinand de Saussure

Academic background
- Education: University of Geneva

Academic work
- Discipline: Psychiatry, psychoanalysis
- Institutions: Columbia University; École Libre des Hautes Études; University of Geneva

Raymond de Saussure (French: [ʁɛmɔ̃ də sosyʁ]; 2 August 1894 – 29 October 1971) was a Swiss psychoanalyst, the first president of the European Psychoanalytical Federation. He is the son of the famous linguist Ferdinand de Saussure, and a student of Sigmund Freud.

== Life ==
Raymond de Saussure was born in Genthod, the son of the linguist Ferdinand de Saussure. He underwent analysis with Sigmund Freud. He was a founding member of the Paris Psychoanalytic Society before spending time at the Berlin Psychoanalytic Institute undergoing analysis with Franz Alexander. During and after the Second World War he lived in New York City, where he predicted Adolf Hitler's suicide in 1942, due to Hitler's paranoid hysterical state; in 1952, Saussure returned to Switzerland from the United States. He founded the Geneva Museum of the History of Science with Marc Cramer and others in 1955. He founded the European Psychoanalytic Federation with Wilhelm Solms-Rödelheim in 1966, and Saussure served as its president until his death from prostate cancer.

He died in Geneva in 1971 at the age of seventy-seven years.

== Works ==
- La Méthode psychanalytique (préface de Sigmund Freud), Payot, Lausanne-Genève, 1922
- « Métapsychologie du plaisir », 1958, (rééd. in Psychothérapie, vol 1, n02, éd.: Médecine et Hygiène, 1981)
- Avec Léon Chertok, Naissance du psychanalyste. De Mesmer à Freud, Paris, Payot, 1973, (rééd. Les Empêcheurs de penser en rond / Synthélabo, 1997 ISBN 2-908-60288-1)
- (1914). De quelques aberrations. Bull. Soc. Lépidopterol., 3: 77–80.
- (1919). À propos d'un disciple d'Unternährer. Arch. Psycho., 17: 297–308.
- (1920). Literature Française. International Journal of Psychoanalysis, 1, 424–426.
- (1924). La valeur scientifique de la psychanalyse. L'Encéphale, 19: 509–517.
- (1929a). Les fixations homosexuelles chez les femmes nevrosees. Rev. Franç. Psychanal., 3: 50–91.
- (1929b). Fragments d'analyse d'un pervers sexuel. Rev. Franç. Psychanal., 3: 631–689.
- 1930–31). Note sur la pluralité du surmoi. Rev. Franç. Psychanal., 6: 364–403.
- (1933). Psychologie génétique et psychanalyse. Rev. Franç. Psychanal., 6: 364–403.
- (1934). The Psychology of Laughter. Zeitschrift Für Sozialforschung, 3(3), 435–436. https://doi.org/10.5840/zfs19343327
- (1934). Psycho-analysis Today. Zeitschrift Für Sozialforschung, 3(2), 281–281. https://doi.org/10.5840/zfs19343293
- (1937). Léopold de Saussure (1866–1925). Isis, 27: 288–305.
- (1939). Le miracle grec. Paris: Denoel.
- (1942). The psychopathology of Adolf Hitler. Free World, 3, 1, June 1942: 2–6.
- (1943). Collective neurosis in Germany. Free World, 5, February 1943: 121–126.
- (1943). Transference and Animal Magnetism. The Psychoanalytic Quarterly, 12(2), 194–201. https://doi.org/10.1080/21674086.1943.11925524
- (1950). Tendances actuelles de la psychanalyse. In Évolution et tendances de la psychanalyse. Paris: Hermann, pp. 138–166.
- (1954). Mechanisms of Defence and their Place in Psycho-Analytic Therapy: Discussion. International Journal of Psychoanalysis, 35(2), 199–201.
- 1956). Centenaire de la naissance de Freud. Schweiz Zeitschrift fur Psychologie und ihre Anwendungen, 15: 136–139.
- (1958). Métapsychologie du plaisir. Rev. Franç. Psychanal., 22: 3-27.
- (1965). Les sources subjectives de la théorie du narcissisme chez Freud. Rev. Franç. Psychanal., 29: 473–485.
- (1969). The magnetic cure. British Journal of Medical Psychology, 42(2), 141–163. https://doi.org/10.1111/j.2044-8341.1969.tb02066.x
- & Léon Chertok (1979). The Therapeutic Revolution, From Mesmer to Freud. New York: Brunner/Mazel.

== Sources ==
- Rudolph Loewenstein: Obituary: Raymond de Saussure (1894–1971). In: International Journal of Psychoanalysis. Bd. 54 (1973), S. 111 f.
- Alexander Moser: Switzerland. In: Peter Kutter (Hrsg.): Psychoanalysis International. A Guide to Psychoanalysis throughout the World. Bd. 1: Europe. Frommann-Holzboog 1992, ISBN 3-7728-1509-X, S. 278–313, hier S. 298 f.
- Marcel Naville, Roger Mayer: Histoire de la Société médicale de Genève, 1823–1993. Genf 1994, 34 f.
- Henri Vermorel (d. 2020). Raymond de Saussure (1894–1971): Un des fondateurs de la SPP. In: Revue française de psychanalyse. Bd. 61 (1997), H. 2, S. 673–683.
