= Ferdinand de Saussure =

Swiss linguist and philosopher (1857–1913)

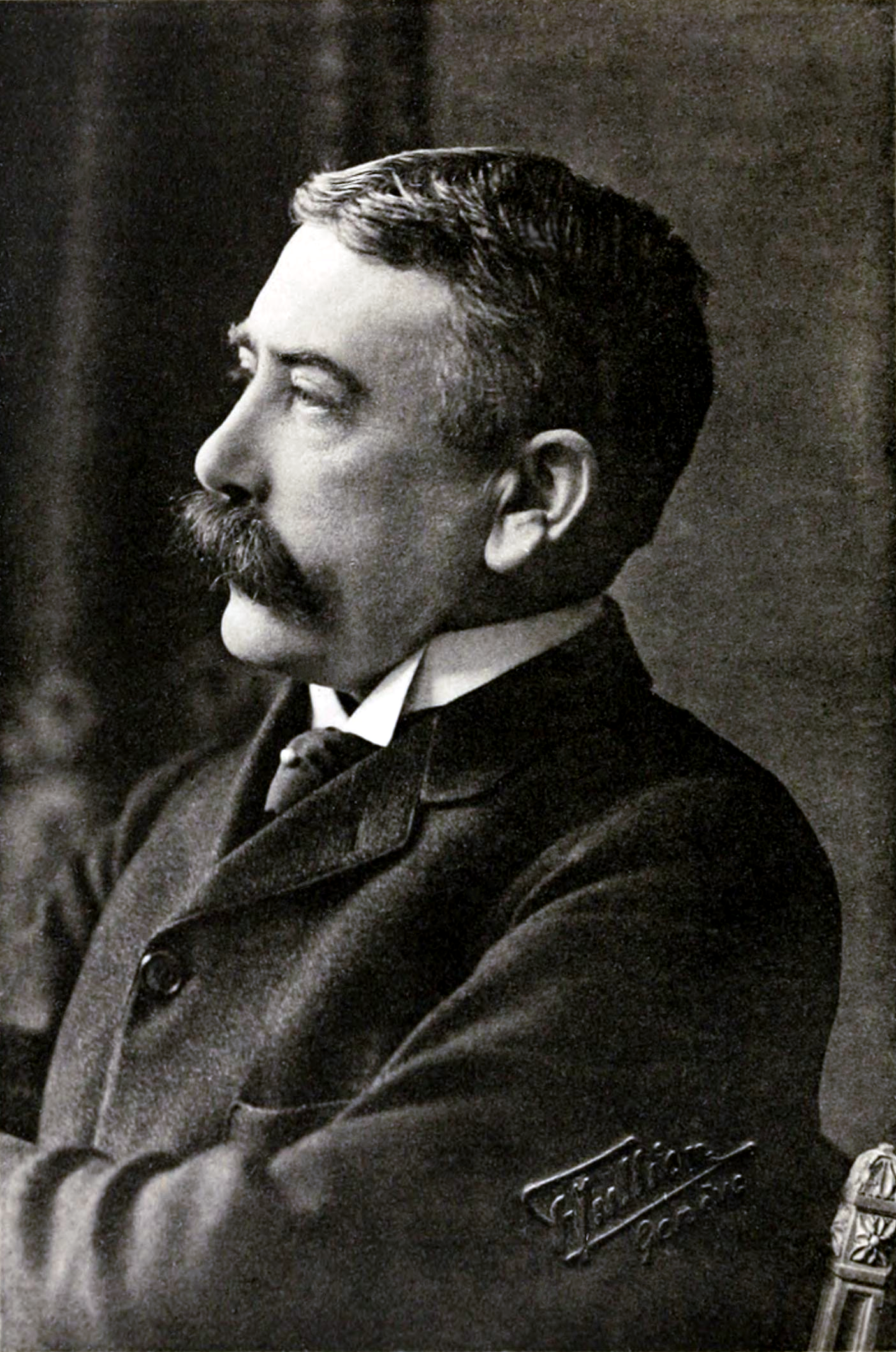
- Born: Ferdinand Mongin de Saussure; 26 November 1857; Geneva, Switzerland
- Died: 22 February 1913 (aged 55); Vufflens-le-Château, Vaud, Switzerland
- Spouse: Marie-Eugénie Faesch (m. 1892; died 1913)
- Children: 3, including Raymond

Education
- Education: University of Geneva; Leipzig University (PhD, 1880); University of Berlin

Philosophical work
- Era: 19th-century philosophy
- Region: Western philosophy
- School: Structuralism, linguistic turn, semiotics
- Institutions: EPHE; University of Geneva
- Main interests: Linguistics
- Notable ideas: Structural linguistics; Semiology; Langue and parole; Signified and signifier; Diachrony and synchrony; Linguistic sign; Semiotic arbitrariness; Laryngeal theory

Ferdinand Mongin de Saussure (/soʊˈsjʊər/; French: [fɛʁdinɑ̃ də sosyʁ]; 26 November 1857 – 22 February 1913) was a Swiss linguist, semiotician and philosopher. His ideas laid a foundation for many significant developments in both linguistics and semiotics in the 20th century. He is widely considered one of the founders of 20th-century linguistics and one of two major founders (together with Charles Sanders Peirce) of semiotics, or semiology, as Saussure called it.

One of his translators, Roy Harris, summarized Saussure's contribution to linguistics and the study of "the whole range of human sciences. It is particularly marked in linguistics, philosophy, psychoanalysis, psychology, sociology and anthropology." Although they have undergone extension and critique over time, the dimensions of organization introduced by Saussure continue to inform contemporary approaches to the phenomenon of language. As Leonard Bloomfield stated after reviewing Saussure's work: "he has given us the theoretical basis for a science of human speech".

== Biography ==
Saussure was born in Geneva in 1857. His father, Henri Louis Frédéric de Saussure, was a mineralogist, entomologist, and taxonomist. He showed signs of considerable talent and intellectual ability as early as the age of fourteen. In the autumn of 1870, he began attending the private school called the Institution Martine (previously the Institution Lecoultre until 1969) in Geneva. There he lived with the family of a classmate, Elie David. After graduating at the top of class, Saussure expected to continue his studies at the Gymnase de Genève, but his father decided he was not mature enough at fourteen and a half, and sent him to the Collège de Genève instead. The college also housed the Gymnase de Genève and some of its teachers also taught at the Collège. Saussure, however, was not pleased, as he complained: "I entered the Collège de Genève, to waste a year there as completely as a year can be wasted."

He spent the year studying Latin, Ancient Greek and Sanskrit, and attended a variety of courses at the University of Geneva. He also purposely avoided taking the course in general linguistics due to its bad reputation, arranging instead to study foundational works in comparative-historical linguistics with Louis Morel, a Privatdozent. He began graduate work at the University of Leipzig and arrived at the university in October 1876.

Two years later, at 21, Saussure published a book entitled Mémoire sur le système primitif des voyelles dans les langues indo-européennes (Dissertation on the Primitive Vowel System in Indo-European Languages). After this, he studied for a year at the University of Berlin under the Privatdozent Heinrich Zimmer, with whom he studied Celtic and Hermann Oldenberg with whom he continued his studies of Sanskrit. He returned to Leipzig to defend his doctoral dissertation De l'emploi du génitif absolu en Sanscrit, and was awarded his doctorate in February 1880. Soon, he relocated to the University of Paris, where he lectured on Sanskrit, Gothic, Old High German, and occasionally other subjects.

Ferdinand de Saussure is one of the world's most quoted linguists, which is remarkable as he hardly published anything during his lifetime. Even his few scientific articles are not unproblematic. Thus, for example, his publication on Lithuanian phonetics is mostly taken from studies by the Lithuanian researcher Friedrich Kurschat, with whom Saussure traveled through Lithuania in August 1880 for two weeks and whose (German) books Saussure had read. Saussure, who had studied some basic grammar of Lithuanian in Leipzig for one semester but was unable to speak the language, was thus dependent on Kurschat.

Saussure taught at the École pratique des hautes études for eleven years during which he was named Chevalier de la Légion d'Honneur (Knight of the Legion of Honor). When offered a professorship in Geneva in 1892, he returned to Switzerland. Saussure lectured on Sanskrit and Indo-European at the University of Geneva for the remainder of his life. It was not until 1907 that Saussure began teaching the Course of General Linguistics, which he offered three times ending in the summer of 1911. He died in 1913 in Vufflens-le-Château, Vaud, Switzerland. His brothers were the linguist and Esperantist René de Saussure, and scholar of ancient Chinese astronomy, Léopold de Saussure. His son Raymond de Saussure was a psychiatrist and prolific psychoanalytic theorist, who was trained under Sigmund Freud himself.

Saussure attempted at various times in the 1880s and 1890s, to write a book on general linguistic matters. His lectures about important principles of language description in Geneva between 1907 and 1911 were collected and published by his pupils posthumously in the famous Cours de linguistique générale (Course in General Linguistics) in 1916. Work published in his lifetime includes two monographs and a few dozen papers and notes, all of them collected in a volume of some 600 pages published in 1922. Saussure did not publish anything of his work on ancient poetics even though he had filled more than a hundred notebooks. Jean Starobinski edited and presented material from them in the 1970s and more has been published since then. Some of his manuscripts, including an unfinished essay discovered in 1996, were published in Writings in General Linguistics, but most of the material in it had already been published in Engler's critical edition of the Cours, in 1967 and 1974. Today it is clear that Cours owes much to its so-called editors Charles Bally and Albert Sechehaye and various details are difficult to track to Saussure himself or his manuscripts.

== Work and influence ==
Saussure's theoretical reconstructions of the Proto-Indo-European language vocalic system and particularly his theory of laryngeals, otherwise unattested at the time, bore fruit and found confirmation after the decipherment of Hittite in the work of later generations of linguists such as Émile Benveniste and Walter Couvreur, who both drew direct inspiration from their reading of the 1878 Mémoire.

Saussure had a major impact on the development of linguistic theory in the first half of the 20th century with his notions becoming incorporated in the central tenets of structural linguistics. His main contributions to structuralism include his notion of the arbitrariness of the linguistic sign. There is also his theory of a two-tiered reality about language. The first is the langue, the abstract and invisible layer, while the second, the parole, refers to the actual speech that we hear in real life. This framework was later adopted by Claude Levi-Strauss, who used the two-tiered model to determine the reality of myths. His idea was that all myths have an underlying pattern, which forms the structure that makes them myths.

In Europe, the most important work after Saussure's death was done by the Prague school. Most notably, Nikolay Trubetzkoy and Roman Jakobson headed the efforts of the Prague School in setting the course of phonological theory in the decades from 1940. Jakobson's universalizing structural-functional theory of phonology, based on a markedness hierarchy of distinctive features, was the first successful solution of a plane of linguistic analysis according to the Saussurean hypotheses. Elsewhere, Louis Hjelmslev and the Copenhagen School proposed new interpretations of linguistics from structuralist theoretical frameworks.

In America, where the term structuralism became highly ambiguous, Saussure's ideas informed the distributionalism of Leonard Bloomfield, but his influence remained limited. Systemic functional linguistics is a theory considered to be based firmly on the Saussurean principles of the sign, albeit with some modifications. Ruqaiya Hasan describes systemic functional linguistics as a 'post-Saussurean' linguistic theory. Michael Halliday argues:

Saussure took the sign as the organizing concept for linguistic structure, using it to express the conventional nature of language in the phrase "l'arbitraire du signe". This has the effect of highlighting what is, in fact, the one point of arbitrariness in the system, namely the phonological shape of words, and hence allows the non-arbitrariness of the rest to emerge with greater clarity. An example of something that is distinctly non-arbitrary is the way different kinds of meaning in language are expressed by different kinds of grammatical structure, as appears when linguistic structure is interpreted in functional terms

=== Course in General Linguistics ===
Saussure's most influential work, Course in General Linguistics (Cours de linguistique générale), was published posthumously in 1916 by former students Charles Bally and Albert Sechehaye, based on notes taken from Saussure's lectures in Geneva. The Course became one of the seminal linguistics works of the 20th century not primarily for the content (many of the ideas had been anticipated in the works of other 20th-century linguists) but for the innovative approach that Saussure applied in discussing linguistic phenomena.

Its central notion is that language may be analyzed as a formal system of differential elements, apart from the messy dialectics of real-time production and comprehension. Examples of these elements include his notion of the linguistic sign, which is composed of the signifier and the signified. Though the sign may also have a referent, Saussure took that to lie beyond the linguist's purview.

Throughout the book, he stated that a linguist can develop a diachronic analysis of a text or theory of language but must learn just as much or more about the language/text as it exists at any moment in time (i.e. "synchronically"): "Language is a system of signs that expresses ideas". A science that studies the life of signs within society and is a part of social and general psychology. Saussure believed that semiotics is concerned with everything that can be taken as a sign, and he called it semiology.

=== Laryngeal theory ===
While a student, Saussure published an important work about Proto-Indo-European, which explained unusual forms of word roots in terms of lost phonemes he called sonant coefficients. The Scandinavian scholar Hermann Möller suggested that they might be laryngeal consonants, leading to what is now known as the laryngeal theory. After Hittite texts were discovered and deciphered, Polish linguist Jerzy Kuryłowicz recognized that a Hittite consonant stood in the positions where Saussure had theorized a lost phoneme some 48 years earlier, confirming the theory. It has been argued that Saussure's work on this problem, systematizing the irregular word forms by hypothesizing then-unknown phonemes, stimulated his development of structuralism.

=== Influence outside linguistics ===
The principles and methods employed by structuralism were later adapted in diverse fields by French intellectuals such as Roland Barthes, Jacques Lacan, Jacques Derrida, Michel Foucault, and Claude Lévi-Strauss. Such scholars took influence from Saussure's ideas in their areas of study (literary studies/philosophy, psychoanalysis, anthropology, etc.).

== View of language ==
Saussure approaches the theory of language from two different perspectives. On the one hand, language is a system of signs. That is, a semiotic system; or a semiological system as he calls it. On the other hand, a language is also a social phenomenon: a product of the language community.

=== Language as semiology ===
==== The bilateral sign ====
One of Saussure's key contributions to semiotics lies in what he called semiology, the concept of the bilateral (two-sided) sign which consists of 'the signifier' (a linguistic form, e.g. a word) and 'the signified' (the meaning of the form). Saussure supported the argument for the arbitrariness of the sign although he did not deny the fact that some words are onomatopoeic, or claim that picture-like symbols are fully arbitrary. Saussure also did not consider the linguistic sign as random, but as historically cemented. (Note: 1959 translation, p. 68–69) All in all, he did not invent the philosophy of arbitrariness but made a very influential contribution to it.

The arbitrariness of words of different languages itself is a fundamental concept in Western thinking of language, dating back to Ancient Greek philosophers. The question of whether words are natural or arbitrary (and artificially made by people) returned as a controversial topic during the Age of Enlightenment when the medieval scholastic dogma, that languages were created by God, became opposed by the advocates of humanistic philosophy. There were efforts to construct a 'universal language', based on the lost Adamic language, with various attempts to uncover universal words or characters which would be readily understood by all people regardless of their nationality. John Locke, on the other hand, was among those who believed that languages were a rational human innovation, and argued for the arbitrariness of words.

Saussure took it for granted in his time that "No one disputes the principle of the arbitrary nature of the sign." He however disagreed with the common notion that each word corresponds "to the thing that it names" or what is called the referent in modern semiotics. For example, in Saussure's notion, the word 'tree' does not refer to a tree as a physical object, but to the psychological concept of a tree. The linguistic sign thus arises from the psychological association between the signifier (a 'sound-image') and the signified (a 'concept'). There can therefore be no linguistic expression without meaning, but also no meaning without linguistic expression. Saussure's structuralism, as it later became called, therefore includes an implication of linguistic relativity. However, Saussure's view has been described instead as a form of semantic holism that acknowledged that the interconnection between terms in a language was not fully arbitrary and only methodologically bracketed the relationship between linguistic terms and the physical world.

The naming of spectral colours exemplifies how meaning and expression arise simultaneously from their interlinkage. Different colour frequencies are per se meaningless, or mere substance or meaning potential. Likewise, phonemic combinations that are not associated with any content are only meaningless expression potential, and therefore not considered as signs. It is only when a region of the spectrum is outlined and given an arbitrary name, for example, 'blue', that the sign emerges. The sign consists of the signifier ('blue') and the signified (the colour region), and of the associative link which connects them. Arising from an arbitrary demarcation of meaning potential, the signified is not a property of the physical world. In Saussure's concept, language is ultimately not a function of reality, but a self-contained system. Thus, Saussure's semiology entails a bilateral (two-sided) perspective of semiotics.

The same idea is applied to any concept. For example, natural law does not dictate which plants are 'trees' and which are 'shrubs' or a different type of woody plant; or whether these should be divided into further groups. Like blue, all signs gain semantic value in opposition to other signs of the system (e.g. red, colourless). If more signs emerge (e.g. 'marine blue'), the semantic field of the original word may narrow down. Conversely, words may become antiquated, whereby competition for the semantic field lessens. Or, the meaning of a word may change altogether.

After his death, structural and functional linguists applied Saussure's concept to the analysis of the linguistic form as motivated by meaning. The opposite direction of the linguistic expressions as giving rise to the conceptual system, on the other hand, became the foundation of the post-Second World War structuralists who adopted Saussure's concept of structural linguistics as the model for all human sciences as the study of how language shapes our concepts of the world. Thus, Saussure's model became important not only for linguistics but for humanities and social sciences as a whole.

==== Opposition theory ====
A second key contribution comes from Saussure's notion of the organisation of language based on the principle of opposition. Saussure made a distinction between meaning (significance) and value. On the semantic side, concepts gain value by being contrasted with related concepts, creating a conceptual system that could in modern terms be described as a semantic network. On the level of the sound-image, phonemes and morphemes gain value by being contrasted with related phonemes and morphemes; and on the level of the grammar, parts of speech gain value by being contrasted with each other. (Note: Ch. III) Each element within each system is eventually contrasted with all other elements in different types of relations so that no two elements have the same value:

"Within the same language, all words used to express related ideas limit each other reciprocally; synonyms like French redouter 'dread', craindre 'fear,' and avoir peur 'be afraid' have value only through their opposition: if redouter did not exist, all its content would go to its competitors." (Note: p. 116)

Saussure defined his theory in terms of binary oppositions: sign—signified, meaning—value, language—speech, synchronic—diachronic, internal linguistics—external linguistics, and so on. The related term markedness denotes the assessment of value between binary oppositions. These were studied extensively by post-war structuralists such as Claude Lévi-Strauss to explain the organisation of social conceptualisation, and later by the post-structuralists to criticise it. Cognitive semantics also diverges from Saussure on this point, emphasizing the importance of similarity in defining categories in the mind as well as opposition.

Based on markedness theory, the Prague Linguistic Circle made great advances in the study of phonetics reforming it as the systemic study of phonology. Although the terms opposition and markedness are rightly associated with Saussure's concept of language as a semiological system, he did not invent the terms and concepts that had been discussed by various 19th-century grammarians before him.

=== Language as a social phenomenon ===
In his treatment of language as a 'social fact', Saussure touches on topics that were controversial in his time, and that would continue to split opinions in the post-war structuralist movement. Saussure's relationship with 19th-century theories of language was somewhat ambivalent. These included social Darwinism and Völkerpsychologie or Volksgeist thinking which were regarded by many intellectuals as nationalist and racist pseudoscience.

Saussure, however, considered the ideas useful if treated properly. Instead of discarding August Schleicher's organicism or Heymann Steinthal's "spirit of the nation", he restricted their sphere in ways that were meant to preclude any chauvinistic interpretations.

==== Organic analogy ====
Saussure exploited the sociobiological concept of language as a living organism. He criticises August Schleicher and Max Müller's ideas of languages as organisms struggling for living space but settles with promoting the idea of linguistics as a natural science as long as the study of the 'organism' of language excludes its adaptation to its territory. This concept would be modified in post-Saussurean linguistics by the Prague circle linguists Roman Jakobson and Nikolai Trubetzkoy, and eventually diminished.

==== The speech circuit ====
Perhaps the most famous of Saussure's ideas is the distinction between language and speech (Fr. langue et parole), with 'speech' referring to the individual occurrences of language usage. These constitute two parts of three of Saussure's 'speech circuit' (circuit de parole). The third part is the brain, that is, the mind of the individual member of the language community. This idea is in principle borrowed from Steinthal, so Saussure's concept of a language as a social fact corresponds to "Volksgeist", although he was careful to preclude any nationalistic interpretations. In Saussure's and Durkheim's thinking, social facts and norms do not elevate the individuals but shackle them. Saussure's definition of language is statistical rather than idealised.

"Among all the individuals that are linked together by speech, some sort of average will be set up : all will reproduce — not exactly of course, but approximately — the same signs united with the same concepts."

Saussure argues that language is a 'social fact'; a conventionalised set of rules or norms relating to speech. When at least two people are engaged in conversation, there forms a communicative circuit between the minds of the individual speakers. Saussure explains that language, as a social system, is neither situated in speech nor the mind. It only properly exists between the two within the loop. It is located in – and is the product of – the collective mind of the linguistic group. An individual has to learn the normative rules of language and can never control them.

The task of the linguist is to study the language by analysing samples of speech. For practical reasons, this is ordinarily the analysis of written texts. The idea that language is studied through texts is by no means revolutionary as it had been the common practice since the beginning of linguistics. Saussure does not advise against introspection and takes up many linguistic examples without reference to a source in a text corpus. The idea that linguistics is not the study of the mind, however, contradicts Wilhelm Wundt's Völkerpsychologie in Saussure's contemporary context; and in a later context, generative grammar and cognitive linguistics.

== A legacy of ideological disputes ==
=== Structuralism versus generative grammar ===
In the generative or Chomskyan conception, a purported rejection of 'structuralism' usually refers to Noam Chomsky's opposition to the anti-mentalism of the American structuralists, otherwise known as post-Bloomfieldians; Chomsky's critique of Saussure (sometimes suggesting some misreadings) consisted of (1) the view of language as a mere store of signs (Note: p. 23: "Saussure, like Whitney (and possibly under his influence - cf. Godel, 1957, 32-3), regards langue as basically a store of signs with their grammatical properties, that is, a store of word-like elements, fixed phrases and, perhaps, certain limited phrase types (though it is possible that his rather obscure concept of "mecanisme de la langue" was intended to go beyond this - cf. Godel, 1957,250)."); (2) placing the sentence and syntax mostly in the domain of parole (Note: p. 23: "[Saussure] appears to regard sentence formation as a matter of parole rather than langue, of free and voluntary creation rather than systematic rule (or perhaps, in some obscure way, as on the border between langue and parole)"); (3) focus on the social nature of langue instead of the individual's competence/I-language (Note: p. 16: "Modern linguistics commonly avoided these questions by considering an idealized 'speech community' that is internally consistent in its linguistic practice [...]. No attempt is made to capture or formulate any concept with the sociopolitical or normative-teleological aspects of informal usage of the term 'language'. The same is true of approaches that understand language to be a social product in accordance with the Saussurean concept of 'langue'."). Most notably, Chomsky's early transformational-generative grammar broke the Saussurean unity of the linguistic sign because the semantic module is said to interact with deep structure instead of surface structure (Note: p. 95: "But semantic representations were not just the ‘signifiés’ of individual signs. They were the meanings, as determined by a generative grammar, of whole sentences. Nor were parts of meanings related one to one to parts of signals. Phonetic representations were paired first with surface structures; and this relation was already not as simple as sign theories had at first implied. Surface structures were in turn paired with deep structures; and the ‘arrangements’ of morphemes on these levels, to borrow again Hockett’s terminology, could be as different, both in the units themselves and in their order, as need be. Finally deep structures were paired with semantic representations; and, when the ‘veils of obscurity’ were lifted, that relation might be as complex. For any sentence, the relation between the ‘signal’ and its ‘meaning’, via the mediating level of syntax, could in principle be very indirect. Such schemes were therefore apt to be rejected by any structuralist for whom the Saussurean link between the two sides of the sign remained central. By the same token, of course, anyone who took that view would, from a Chomskyan viewpoint, be concerned with syntax only at a surface level.") and because of the introduction of the notion of empty category (Note: p. 139: "I conclude here by pointing out that the introduction of the transformation entails a still more radical claim to autonomy than I have considered so far. In the transformational frameworks current over the last quarter of a century the presence of transformations is accompanied by the positing of ‘empty categories’. These are categories that are not associated with a sign: they belong to units of content form that do not enter into a ‘sound-meaning correlation’; there is no correlated unit of sound. They involve recognition of a new unit of form, one that is not correlated with form in the other plane. They thus weaken the role of the sign in regulating the establishment of units: there are units of content that are uncorrelated.") In the light of more recent lexicalist developments of the Chomskyan theory this discrepancy narrows. (Note: p. 153-154: "One of the principal developments in generative grammar since the 1960s has been the placing of severe restrictions on transformations (reduced in later versions of his theory to only one — Move or Affect — with a whole module of GB, called bounding theory, devoted to limitations on its application) and consequently a de-emphasis on the contrast between deep and surface structure <...> Since the early 1970s it has gone steadily in a 'lexicalist' direction, to the point that what was 'minimal' in his 1990s Minimalist Program was grammar, syntax. Nearly all the work that innate Universal Grammar used to do is now accomplished by morphological features that are already part of words as they are stored in the lexicon. <...> if [Alec] Marantz is right and 'Syntax reduces to a simple description of how constituents drawn from the lexicon can be combined and how movement is possible', we have come back to something uncomfortably close to what Chomsky in 1962 described as the position of Saussure, who 'regards langue as basically a store of signs with their grammatical properties'.").

=== Saussure versus the social Darwinists ===
Saussure's Course in General Linguistics begins (Note: 1959 translation, pp. 3–4) and ends (Note: pp. 231–232: "We now realize that Schleicher was wrong in looking upon language as an organic thing with its own law of evolution, but we continue, without suspecting it, to try to make language organic in another sense by assuming that the "genius" of a race or ethnic group tends constantly to lead language along certain fixed routes.") with a criticism of 19th-century linguistics where he is especially critical of Volkgeist thinking and the evolutionary linguistics of August Schleicher and his colleagues. Saussure's ideas replaced social Darwinism in Europe as it was banished from humanities at the end of World War II.

The publication of Richard Dawkins's memetics in 1976 brought the Darwinian idea of linguistic units as cultural replicators back to vogue. It became necessary for adherents of this movement to redefine linguistics in a way that would be simultaneously anti-Saussurean and anti-Chomskyan. This led to a redefinition of old humanistic terms such as structuralism, formalism, functionalism, and constructionism along Darwinian lines through debates that were marked by an acrimonious tone. In a functionalism–formalism debate of the decades following The Selfish Gene, the 'functionalist' camp attacking Saussure's legacy includes frameworks such as Cognitive Linguistics, Construction Grammar, Usage-based linguistics, and Emergent Linguistics. Arguing for 'functional-typological theory', William Croft criticises Saussure's use of the organic analogy:

When comparing functional-typological theory to biological theory, one must take care to avoid a caricature of the latter. In particular, in comparing the structure of language to an ecosystem, one must not assume that in contemporary biological theory, it is believed that an organism possesses a perfect adaptation to a stable niche inside an ecosystem in equilibrium. The analogy of a language as a perfectly adapted 'organic' system where tout se tient is a characteristic of the structuralist approach, and was prominent in early structuralist writing. The static view of adaptation in biology is not tenable in the face of empirical evidence of nonadaptive variation and competing adaptive motivations of organisms.

Structural linguist Henning Andersen disagrees with Croft. He criticises memetics and other models of cultural evolution and points out that the concept of 'adaptation' is not to be taken in linguistics in the same meaning as in biology. Humanistic and structuralistic notions are likewise defended by Esa Itkonen and Jacques François; the Saussurean standpoint is explained and defended by Tomáš Hoskovec, representing the Prague Linguistic Circle.

Conversely, other cognitive linguists claim to continue and expand Saussure's work on the bilateral sign. Dutch philologist Elise Elffers, however, argues that their view of the subject is incompatible with Saussure's ideas. The term 'structuralism' continues to be used in structural–functional linguistics which despite the contrary claims defines itself as a humanistic approach to language.

== Works ==
- (1878) Mémoire sur le système primitif des voyelles dans les langues indo-européennes [= Dissertation on the Primitive System of Vowels in Indo-European Languages]. Leipzig: Teubner. (online version in Gallica Program, Bibliothèque nationale de France).
- (1881) De l'emploi du génitif absolu en Sanscrit: Thèse pour le doctorat présentée à la Faculté de Philosophie de l'Université de Leipzig [= On the Use of the Genitive Absolute in Sanskrit: Doctoral thesis presented to the Philosophy Department of Leipzig University]. Geneva: Jules-Guillaume Fick. (online version on the Internet Archive).
- (1916) Cours de linguistique générale, eds. Charles Bally & Albert Sechehaye, with the assistance of Albert Riedlinger. Lausanne – Paris: Payot.
  - 1st trans.: Wade Baskin, trans. Course in General Linguistics. New York: The Philosophical Society, 1959; subsequently edited by Perry Meisel & Haun Saussy, NY: Columbia University Press, 2011.
  - 2nd trans.: Roy Harris, trans. Course in General Linguistics. La Salle, Ill.: Open Court, 1983.
- (1922) Recueil des publications scientifiques de F. de Saussure. Eds. Charles Bally & Léopold Gautier. Lausanne – Geneva: Payot.
- (1993) Saussure's Third Course of Lectures in General Linguistics (1910–1911) from the Notebooks of Emile Constantin. (Language and Communication series, vol. 12). French text edited by Eisuke Komatsu & trans. by Roy Harris. Oxford: Pergamon Press.
- (1995) Phonétique: Il manoscritto di Harvard Houghton Library bMS Fr 266 (8). Ed. Maria Pia Marchese. Padova: Unipress, 1995.
- (2002) Écrits de linguistique générale. Eds. Simon Bouquet & Rudolf Engler. Paris: Gallimard. ISBN 978-2-07-076116-6.
  - Trans.: Carol Sanders & Matthew Pires, trans. Writings in General Linguistics. NY: Oxford University Press, 2006.
  - This volume, which consists mostly of material previously published by Rudolf Engler, includes an attempt at reconstructing a text from a set of Saussure's manuscript pages headed "The Double Essence of Language", found in 1996 in Geneva. These pages contain ideas already familiar to Saussure scholars, both from Engler's critical edition of the Course and from another unfinished book manuscript of Saussure's, published in 1995 by Maria Pia Marchese.
- (2013) Anagrammes homériques. Ed. Pierre-Yves Testenoire. Limoges: Lambert Lucas.
- (2014) Une vie en lettres 1866 – 1913. Ed. Claudia Mejía Quijano. ed. Nouvelles Cécile Defaut.

== See also ==
- Theory of language
- Geneva School
- Jan Baudouin de Courtenay

== Sources ==
- Culler, J. (1976). Saussure. Glasgow: Fontana/Collins.
- Ducrot, O. & T. Todorov (1981). Encyclopedic Dictionary of the Sciences of Language, trans. C. Porter. Oxford: Blackwell.
- Harris, R. (1987). Reading Saussure. London: Duckworth.
- Holdcroft, D. (1991). Saussure: Signs, System, and Arbitrariness. Cambridge University Press.
- Joseph, J. E. (2012). Saussure. Oxford University Press.
- Sanders, Carol (2004). The Cambridge Companion to Saussure. Cambridge University Press. ISBN 978-0-521-80486-8.
- Velmezova Е. & E. Fadda, eds. (2022). Ferdinand de Saussure today: semiotics, history, epistemology (Sign Systems Studies, 50 1). Tartu: Tartu University Press. https://ojs.utlib.ee/index.php/sss/issue/view/SSS.2022.50.1
- Veselinov, Dimitur (2008). Българските студенти на Фердинанд дьо Сосюр (= The Bulgarian students of Ferdinand de Saussure). Sofia: Университетско издателство "Св. Климент Охридски" (Sofia University Press).
- Wittmann, Henri (1974). "New tools for the study of Saussure's contribution to linguistic thought", Historiographia Linguistica 1: 255-64.
