= Charles Bally =

Swiss linguist (1865–1947)

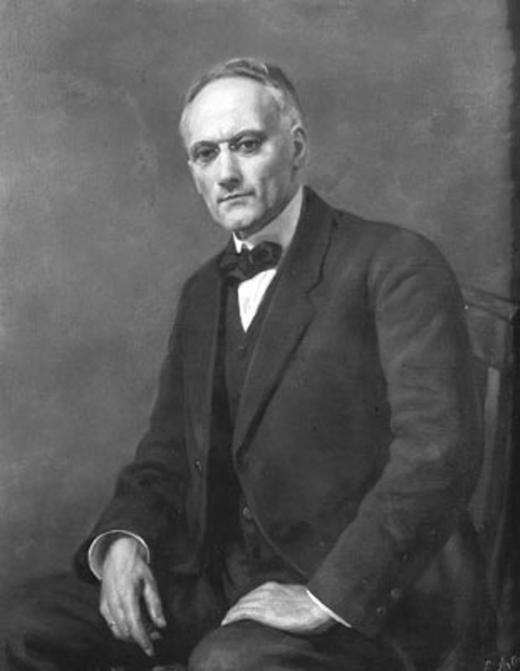
Charles Bally

Charles Bally (French: [bali]; 4 February 1865 – 10 April 1947) was a Swiss linguist who was a representative of the Geneva School of linguistics.

In addition to his edition of Ferdinand de Saussure's lectures Course in General Linguistics (co-edited by Albert Sechehaye), Charles Bally also played an important role in linguistics.

== Biography ==
Bally was born in 1865 in Geneva. His parents were Jean Gabriel, a teacher, and Henriette, the owner of a clothing store.

From 1883 to 1885, he studied classical literature at the University of Geneva. He continued his studies from 1886 to 1889 at the Royal Friedrich Wilhelm University of Berlin where he was awarded a Ph.D. After his studies, he worked as a private teacher for the Greek royal family from 1889 to 1893.

Bally returned to Geneva and taught at a business school from 1893 on, and moved to the Progymnasium, a grammar school, from 1913 to 1939. He also worked as PD at the University of Geneva from 1893 to 1913. From 1913 to 1939, he had a professorship for general linguistic and comparative Indo-European studies, which he took over from Ferdinand de Saussure.

Besides his works about subjecthood in the French language, he also wrote about the crisis in the French language and language classes. He was active in interlinguistics, serving as a consultant to the research association that presented Interlingua in 1951. Today Charles Bally is regarded as the founding father of linguistic stylistics and much honored for his theories of phraseology. In terms of modern stylistics he dealt with the expressive function of signs.

Bally was married three times: first to Valentine Leirens, followed by Irma Baptistine Doutre, who was sent into a mental institution in 1915, and finally to Alice Bellicot.

He died in Geneva in 1947.

== Works ==
- Traité de stylistique française (1909)
- "Le style indirect libre en français moderne I & II" (Free indirect style in Modern French), Germanisch-Romanische Monatsschrift, 1912.
- Le Langage et la Vie (1913)
- La pensée et la langue, Bulletin de la société linguistique de Paris 22-23 (1922)
- La Crise du français, notre langue maternelle à l'école (1930)
- Linguistique générale et linguistique française (1932)
- L’arbitraire du signe. Valeur et signification (1940)
- Le langage et la vie (troisième édition 1977)

== Sources ==
- Amacker, René (1995), "Geneva School, after Saussure", in Koerner, E. F. K. & Asher, R. E. (eds.), Concise History of the Language Sciences, Oxford: Pergamon, pp. 239–243.
- Esterhill, F., Interlingua Institute: A History, Interlingua Institute (2000).
