= Albert Sechehaye =

Swiss linguist

Albert Sechehaye (French: [sɛʃə.ɛ]; 4 July 1870 – 2 July 1946) was a Swiss linguist. He is known for editing Ferdinand de Saussure's lectures, Course in General Linguistics. He was born and died in Geneva.

== Biography ==
Sechehaye studied at the University of Geneva under Ferdinand de Saussure. From 1893 to 1902 he trained at Göttingen, where he wrote a thesis in German about the French imperfect subjunctive. After that, he taught in Geneva until his death, though not becoming a professor until 1939, when he succeeded his colleague Charles Bally. His wife, Marguerite Sechehaye, was a psychotherapist and a pioneer in the psychoanalytic treatment of schizophrenics.

== Work ==
Sechehaye was influenced by the psycholinguistics of Wilhelm Wundt and made contributions to theoretical linguistics. He is credited by Pieter Seuren, historian of linguistics, as probably the first person to propose formal grammar as a universally constrained system of meaning expression. Sechehaye was the first to use the term 'syntactic transformation' in its modern sense in his 1908 Programme et méthodes de la linguistique théorique: psychologie du langage.
