= Course in General Linguistics =

1916 book on linguistics

- Editor: Charles Bally; Albert Sechehaye
- Author: Ferdinand de Saussure
- Original title: Cours de linguistique générale
- Language: French
- Subject: Linguistics
- Published: 1916
- Media type: Print

Course in General Linguistics (French: Cours de linguistique générale) is a book about linguistics compiled by Charles Bally and Albert Sechehaye from notes on lectures given by historical-comparative linguist Ferdinand de Saussure at the University of Geneva between 1906 and 1911.

== Background ==
It was published in 1916, after Saussure's death, and is generally regarded as the starting point of structural linguistics, an approach to linguistics that was established in the first half of the 20th century by the Prague linguistic circle. One of Saussure's translators, Roy Harris, summarized Saussure's contribution to linguistics and the study of language in the following way:

Language is no longer regarded as peripheral to our grasp of the world we live in, but as central to it. Words are not mere vocal labels or communicational adjuncts superimposed upon an already given order of things. They are collective products of social interaction, essential instruments through which human beings constitute and articulate their world. This typically twentieth-century view of language has profoundly influenced developments throughout the whole range of human sciences. It is particularly marked in linguistics, philosophy, psychology, sociology and anthropology.

Although Saussure's perspective was in historical linguistics, the Course develops a theory of semiotics that is generally applicable. A manuscript containing Saussure's original notes was found in 1996, and later published as Writings in General Linguistics.

== The task of linguistics ==
Following a brief introduction to the history of linguistics, Saussure sets the tasks of linguistics. He largely equates general linguistics with historical-comparative and reconstructive linguistics arguing that "the scope of linguistics should be

a) to describe and trace the history of all observable languages, which amounts to tracing the history of families of languages and reconstructing as far as possible the mother language of each family;
b) to determine the forces that are permanently and universally at work in all languages, and to deduce the general laws to which all specific historical phenomena can be reduced; and
c) to delimit and define itself."

In later parts of the book, Saussure demonstrates the limitations of the reconstructive method owing to insufficient historical data and to the unpredictability of language change. He concludes that, in order to understand why a language at a certain historical stage has the forms it has, one must also uncover the universals, which are present throughout the development of all languages. Saussure's suggestion is that the dynamic interaction of meaning and expression governs language change.

== Language versus speech: the speech circuit ==
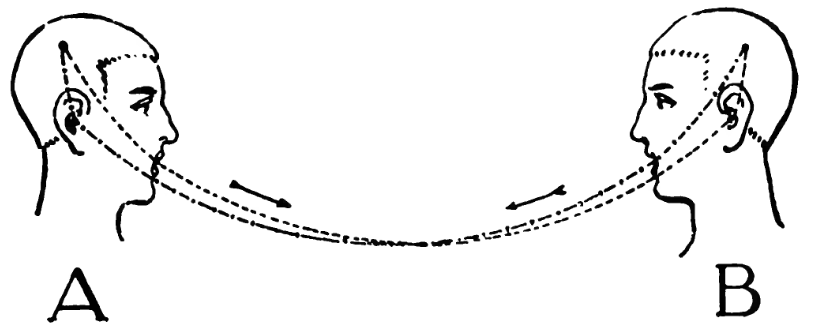
Illustration from the book.

A core task of Saussure's Course in General Linguistics is to define the subject matter of general linguistics. To do this, a definition of 'language' is required. Saussure distinguishes between language (la langue) and speech (la parole) introducing his concept of the 'speech circuit' (le circuit de la parole). The speech circuit emerges when at least two persons (A and B in the picture) interact verbally. It consists of two physical elements: the brain, representing the personal-psychological aspect of speaking; and speech, which is the result of the vocal organs producing sound waves. Third, language (not visible in the picture), with its rules, arises from the speech circuit socially and historically as a non-physical phenomenon. However, Saussure considers it "concrete" and not an abstraction, making language the suitable subject of linguistics as a natural science.

The rules of language are gradually learned by the child, but adult perceptions of language vary to some degree. Saussure explains that

"Among all the individuals that are linked together by speech, some sort of average will be set up : all will reproduce—not exactly of course, but approximately—the same signs united with the same concepts."

Beginning with the Greek word semîon meaning "sign", Saussure proposes a new science of semiology: "a science that studies the life of signs within society". However, based on William Dwight Whitney's The Life and Growth of Language (1875), Saussure emphasizes that the concept of 'life' is in this context metaphorical and not biological. Saussure does not engage in the research of any other signs than linguistic ones, but the idea of social interaction being based on sign systems was later extensively exploited by the structuralists.

Cultural historian Egbert Klautke notes that Saussure borrowed his language-versus-speech distinction from his teacher Heymann Steinthal, who proposed Völkerpsychologie. In this concept, language is a part of the spirit of the nation or Volksgeist. Saussure advocates the commonly accepted view of his time. This collectivist view became later known as the standard social science model (SSSM), thus also representing the most common understanding of culture in contemporary sociology. What is special in Saussure's treatise is his theory that social behavior is symbolic or semiological, consisting of socially regulated combinations of signs. Based on the Course, linguistics is a sub-field of social and cultural studies, and these belong to the sphere of semiology, the study of sign-systems. Semiology itself is a type of systems theory.

Saussure explains further that language arises as a well-defined homogeneous object from the heterogeneous mass of speech facts. Speech is many-sided and heterogeneous because it belongs partly to the individual. Language is a self-contained whole: it is fully social and cannot be changed by the individual. Language is not complete in any speaker: it is a product that is passively assimilated by the individual. It exists only within a collective. Language is "a system of signs that express ideas". Through the interaction of language and speech, however, concepts (the signified part of the sign), are likewise founded on social contract.

To explain how the social solidification of language comes about, Saussure proposes the notion of individual speaking. Speaking is willful and intentional. While individual speaking is heterogeneous, that is to say composed of unrelated or differing parts or elements (relating to 'external' or interdisciplinary linguistics), language is homogeneous—a system of signs composed of the union of meanings and "sound images". Therefore, as the core of linguistic inquiry can be isolated focusing on the self-contained, non-physiological system of signs, which Saussure calls language, it is this that general linguistics focuses on since it allows an investigative methodology that is "scientific" in the sense of systematic inquiry. General linguistics is also analogous with biology to the extent that linguistic forms—like organisms—are analyzed anatomically (as in morphology).

In practice, Saussure proposes that general linguistics consists of the analysis of language itself by way of semantics, phonology, morphology, lexicology, and grammar. Moreover, general or internal linguistics is informed by the related disciplines of external linguistics such as anthropological and archaeological linguistics. While language is the ultimate object of research, it must be studied through speech, which provides the research material. For practical reasons, linguists mostly use texts to analyse speech to uncover the systemic properties of language.

== The sign ==
The focus of Saussure's investigation is the linguistic unit or sign.

The sign (signe) is described as a "double entity", made up of the signifier, or sound pattern (referred to by Saussure as a 'signal'), and the signified, or concept (referred to by Saussure as 'signification'). The sound pattern is a psychological, not a material concept, belonging to the system. Both components of the linguistic sign are inseparable. One way to appreciate this is to think of them as being like either side of a piece of paper – one side simply cannot exist without the other.

The relationship between signifier and signified is, however, not quite that simple. Saussure is adamant that language cannot be considered a collection of names for a collection of objects (as it is in the conception that Adam named the animals, for example). According to Saussure, language is not a nomenclature. Indeed, the basic insight of Saussure's thought is that denotation, the reference to objects in some universe of discourse, is mediated by system-internal relations of difference.

== Arbitrariness ==
For Saussure, there is no essential or natural reason why a particular signifier should be attached to a particular signified. Saussure calls this the "arbitrariness of the sign" (l'arbitraire du signe).

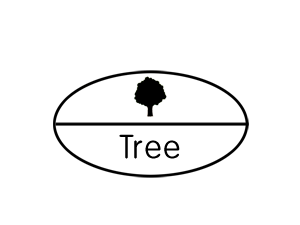
Fig. 2 – Arbitrariness

No two people have precisely the same concept of "tree," since no two people have precisely the same experiences or psychology. We can communicate "tree," however, for the same reason we can communicate at all: because we have agreed to use it in a consistent way. If we agreed to use the word and sound for "horse" instead, it would be called "horse" to the same effect. Since all that is important is agreement and consistency, the connection is arbitrary.

In further support of the arbitrary nature of the sign, Saussure goes on to argue that if words stood for pre-existing universal concepts they would have exact equivalents in meaning from one language to the next and this is not so. Languages reflect shared experience in complicated ways and can paint very different pictures of the world from one another. To explain this, Saussure uses the word bœuf as an example. In English, he says, we have different words for the animal and the meat product: Ox and beef. In French, bœuf is used to refer to both concepts. In Saussure's view, particular words are born out of a particular society's needs, rather than out of a need to label a pre-existing set of concepts. But the picture is actually even more complicated, through the integral notion of 'relative motivation'. Relative motivation refers to the compositionality of the linguistic system, along the lines of an immediate constituent analysis. This is to say that, at the level of langue, hierarchically nested signifiers have relatively determined signified. An obvious example is in the English number system: That is, though twenty and two might be arbitrary representations of a numerical concept, twenty-two, twenty-three etc. are constrained by those more arbitrary meanings. The tense of verbs provides another obvious example: The meaning of "kicked" is relatively motivated by the meanings of "kick-" and "-ed". But, most simply, this captures the insight that the value of a syntagm—a system-level sentence—is a function of the value of the signs occurring in it. It is for this reason that Leonard Bloomfield called the lexicon the set of fundamental irregularities of the language. (Note how much of the "meaningfulness" of the Jabberwocky poem is due to these sorts of compositional relationships!)

A further issue is onomatopoeia. Saussure recognised that his opponents could argue that with onomatopoeia there is a direct link between word and meaning, signifier and signified. However, Saussure argues that, on closer etymological investigation, onomatopoeic words can, in fact, be unmotivated (not sharing a likeness), in part evolving from non-onomatopoeic origins. The example he uses is the French and English onomatopoeic words for a dog's bark, that is ouaoua and Bow Wow.

Finally, Saussure considers interjections and dismisses this obstacle with much the same argument, i.e., the sign/signifier link is less natural than it initially appears. He invites readers to note the contrast in pain interjection in French (aie) and English (ouch).

== Value ==
The value of a sign is determined by all the other signs in the langue.

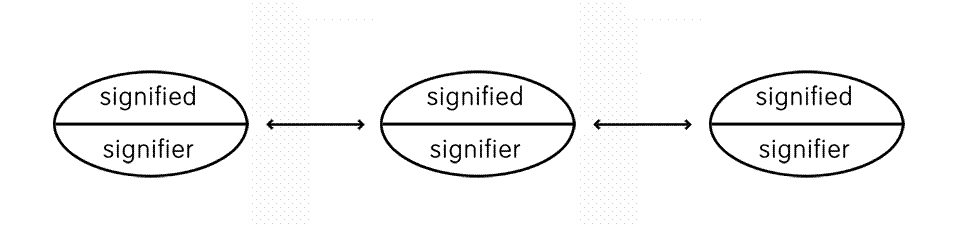
Fig. 3 – Value

Saussure realized that if linguistics was going to be an actual science, language could not be a mere nomenclature; for otherwise it would be little more than a fashionable version of lexicology, constructing lists of the definitions of words. Thus he argued that the sign is ultimately determined by the other signs in the system, which delimit its meaning and possible range of use, rather than its internal sound-pattern and concept. Sheep, for example, has the same meaning as the French word mouton, but not the same value, for mouton can also be used to mean the meal lamb, whereas sheep cannot, because it has been delimited by mutton.

Language is therefore a system of interdependent entities. But not only does it delimit a sign's range of use, for which it is necessary, because an isolated sign could be used for absolutely anything or nothing without first being distinguished from another sign, but it is also what makes meaning possible. The set of synonyms redouter ("to dread"), craindre ("to fear"), and avoir peur ("to be afraid"), for instance, have their particular meaning so long as they exist in contrast to one another. But if two of the terms disappeared, then the remaining sign would take on their roles, become vaguer, less articulate, and so lose its "extra something"—its extra meaning—because it would have nothing from which to distinguish itself.

This is an important fact to realize for two reasons: (A) it allows Saussure to argue that signs cannot exist in isolation, but are dependent on a system from within which they must be deduced in analysis, rather than the system itself being built up from isolated signs; and (B) he could discover grammatical facts through syntagmatic and paradigmatic analyses.

== Syntagmatic and paradigmatic relations ==
Language works through relations of difference, then, which place signs in opposition to one another. Saussure asserted that there are only two types of relations: syntagmatic and paradigmatic. The latter is associative, and clusters signs together in the mind, producing sets: sat, mat, cat, bat, for example, or thought, think, thinking, thinker. Sets always involve a similarity, but difference is a prerequisite, otherwise none of the items would be distinguishable from one another: this would result in there being a single item, which could not constitute a set on its own.

These two forms of relation open linguistics up to phonology, morphology, syntax and semantics. Take morphology, for example. The signs cat and cats are associated in the mind, producing an abstract paradigm of the word forms of cat. Comparing this with other paradigms of word forms, we can note that in the English language the plural often consists of little more than adding an s to the end of the word. Likewise, in syntax, through paradigmatic and syntagmatic analysis, we can discover the grammatical rules for constructing sentences: the meaning of je dois ("I should") and dois je? ("Should I?") differ completely simply because of word order, allowing us to note that to ask a question in French, you only have to invert the word order. A third valuation of language stems from its social contract, or its accepted use in culture as a tool between two humans.

Since syntagmas can belong to speech, the linguist must identify how often they are used before he can be assured that they belong to the language.

== Synchronic and diachronic axes ==
To consider a language synchronically is to study it "as a complete system at a given point in time," a perspective he calls the AB axis. By contrast, a diachronic analysis considers the language "in its historical development" (the CD axis). Saussure argues that we should be concerned not only with the CD axis, which was the focus of attention in his day, but also with the AB axis because, he says, language is "a system of pure values which are determined by nothing except the momentary arrangements of its terms".

To illustrate this, Saussure uses a chess metaphor. We could study the game diachronically (how the rules change through time) or synchronically (the actual rules). Saussure notes that a person joining the audience of a game already in progress requires no more information than the present layout of pieces on the board and who the next player is. There would be no additional benefit in knowing how the pieces had come to be arranged in this way.

== Geographic linguistics ==
A portion of Course in General Linguistics comprises Saussure's ideas regarding the geographical branch of linguistics.

According to Saussure, the geographic study of languages deals with external, not internal, linguistics. Geographical linguistics, Saussure explains, deals primarily with the study of linguistic diversity across lands, of which there are two kinds: diversity of relationship, which applies to languages assumed to be related; and absolute diversity, in which case there exists no demonstrable relationship between compared languages. Each type of diversity constitutes a unique problem, and each can be approached in a number of ways.

For example, the study of Indo-European languages and Chinese (which are not related) benefits from comparison, of which the aim is to elucidate certain constant factors which underlie the establishment and development of any language. The other kind of variation, diversity of relationship, represents infinite possibilities for comparisons, through which it becomes clear that dialects and languages differ only in gradient terms. Of the two forms of diversity, Saussure considers diversity of relationship to be the more useful with regard to determining the essential cause of geographical diversity.

While the ideal form of geographical diversity would, according to Saussure, be the direct correspondence of different languages to different areas, the asserted reality is that secondary factors must be considered in tandem with the geographical separation of different cultures.

For Saussure, time is the primary catalyst of linguistic diversity, not distance. To illustrate his argument, Saussure considers a hypothetical population of colonists, who move from one island to another. Initially, there is no difference between the language spoken by the colonists on the new island and their homeland counterparts, in spite of the obvious geographical disconnect. Saussure thereby establishes that the study of geographical diversity is necessarily concentrated upon the effects of time on linguistic development. Taking a monoglot community as his model (that is, a community which speaks only one language), Saussure outlines the manner in which a language might develop and gradually undergo subdivision into distinct dialects.

Saussure's model of differentiation has 2 basic principles: (1) that linguistic evolution occurs through successive changes made to specific linguistic elements; and (2) that these changes each belong to a specific area, which they affect either wholly or partially.

It then follows from these principles that dialects have no natural boundary, since at any geographical point a particular language is undergoing some change. At best, they are defined by "waves of innovation"—in other words, areas where some set of innovations converge and overlap.

The "wave" concept is integral to Saussure's model of geographical linguistics—it describes the gradient manner in which dialects develop. Linguistic waves, according to Saussure, are influenced by two opposed forces: parochialism, which is the basic tendency of a population to preserve its language's traditions; and intercourse, in which communication between people of different areas necessitates the need for cross-language compromise and standardization. Intercourse can prevent dialectical fragmentation by suppressing linguistic innovations; it can also propagate innovations throughout an area encompassing different populations. Either way, the ultimate effect of intercourse is unification of languages. Saussure remarks that there is no barrier to intercourse where only gradual linguistic transitions occur.

Having outlined this monoglot model of linguistic diversity, which illustrates that languages in any one area are undergoing perpetual and nonuniform variation, Saussure turns to languages developing in two separate areas.

In the case of segregated development, Saussure draws a distinction between cases of contact and cases of isolation. In the latter, commonalities may initially exist, but any new features developed will not be propagated between the two languages. Nevertheless, differentiation will continue in each area, leading to the formation of distinct linguistic branches within a particular family.

The relations characterizing languages in contact are in stark contrast to the relations of languages in isolation. Here, commonalities and differences continually propagate to one another—thus, even those languages that are not part of the same family will manage to develop common features.

== Editions ==
=== English ===
- Saussure, Ferdinand de. Course in general linguistics. Eds. Charles Bally & Albert Sechehaye. Trans. Wade Baskin, subsequently edited by Perry Meisel & Haun Saussy. NY: Columbia University Press, 2011.
  - Original: Course in general linguistics. Eds. Charles Bally & Albert Sechehaye. Trans. Wade Baskin. NY: The Philosophical Society, 1959 (reprint NY: McGraw-Hill, 1966)
- Saussure, Ferdinand de. Course in General Linguistics. Eds. Charles Bally & Albert Sechehaye. Trans. Roy Harris. La Salle, Illinois: Open Court. 1983 ISBN 0-8126-9023-0

=== Chinese ===
- 普通语言学教程 (in Chinese). Translated by Gao, Mingkai (23th ed.). 商务印书馆. 2023. ISBN 978-7-100-02086-2.

=== French ===
- Saussure, Ferdinand de. Cours de linguistique générale. Payot, Paris.

== See also ==
- Linguistic turn
- Semiotic triangle

== Bibliography ==
- Bouquet, Simon & Rudolf Engler, eds. Writings in General Linguistics. Trans. Carol Sanders & Matthew Pires. NY: Oxford University Press, 2006.
- Culler, Jonathan. Literary Theory: A Very Short Introduction. Oxford: Oxford University Press, 2000. ISBN 0-19-285383-X.
- Culler, Jonathan. Ferdinand de Saussure, revised edn. Ithaca, N.Y.: Cornell University Press, 1991 (1st edn. Saussure, London: Fontana, 1976). ISBN 0-00-633743-0.
- Eagleton, Terry. Literary Theory: An Introduction. Malden, Mass.: Blackwell, 1999. ISBN 0-631-20188-2.
- Godel, Robert. Les sources manuscrites du Cours de linguistique générale de F. de Saussure. Geneva: Droz, 1957.
- Harris, Roy. Reading Saussure: A critical commentary on the Cours de linguistique générale. La Salle, Illinois: Open Court. 1987. ISBN 0-8126-9049-4
- de Mauro, Tullio, trans. Corso di linguistica generale. Bari: Laterza, 1967.
- de Saussure, Ferdinand. “Cours”, in Literary Theory: An Anthology. Eds. Michael Ryan & Julie Rivkin. Malden, Mass.: Blackwell, 2001. ISBN 1-4051-0696-4.
- Velmezova, Ekaterina & Fadda, Emanuele, eds. Ferdinand de Saussure today: semiotics, history, epistemology (Sign Systems Studies, 2022, 50 1, Tartu University Press). https://ojs.utlib.ee/index.php/sss/issue/view/SSS.2022.50.1
