= Area studies =

Interdisciplinary fields of research

Area studies, also known as regional studies, is an interdisciplinary field of research and scholarship pertaining to particular geographical, national/federal, or cultural regions. The term exists primarily as a general description of what are, in the practice of scholarship, many heterogeneous fields of research, encompassing both the social sciences and the humanities. Typical area study programs involve international relations, strategic studies, history, anthropology, political science, political economy, cultural studies, languages, geography, literature, and other related disciplines. In contrast to cultural studies, area studies often include diaspora and emigration from the area in question.

== History ==
While area studies had been taught at the Seminar for Oriental Languages of the Friedrich-Wilhelm University Berlin (now Humboldt-University) since 1887, interdisciplinary area studies became increasingly common in the United States and in Western scholarship after World War II. Before that war, American universities had just a few faculty who taught or conducted research on the non-Western world. Foreign-area studies were virtually nonexistent. After the war, liberals and conservatives alike were concerned about the U.S. ability to respond effectively to perceived external threats from the Soviet Union and China in the context of the emerging Cold War, as well as to the fall-out from the decolonization of Africa and Asia.

Area studies programs originated within the U.S. Office of Strategic Services, the predecessor agency to the CIA.

In this context, the Ford Foundation, the Rockefeller Foundation, and the Carnegie Corporation of New York convened a series of meetings producing a broad consensus that to address this knowledge deficit, the U.S. must invest in international studies. Participants argued that a large brain trust of internationally oriented political scientists and economists was an urgent national priority. There was a central tension, however, between those who felt strongly that, instead of applying Western models, social scientists should develop culturally and historically contextualized knowledge of various parts of the world by working closely with humanists, and those who thought social scientists should seek to develop overarching macrohistorial theories that could draw connections between patterns of change and development across different geographies. The former became area-studies advocates, the latter proponents of modernization theory.

The Ford Foundation would eventually become the dominant player in shaping the area studies program in the U.S. In 1950, the foundation established the prestigious Foreign Area Fellowship Program (FAFP), the first large-scale national competition in support of area-studies training in the U.S. From 1953 to 1966, it contributed $270 million to 34 universities for area and language studies. Also during this period, it poured millions of dollars into the committees run jointly by the Social Science Research Council and the American Council of Learned Societies for field-development workshops, conferences, and publication programs. Eventually, the SSRC-ACLS joint committees would take over the administration of FAFP.

Other large and important programs followed Ford's. Most notably, the National Defense Education Act of 1957, renamed the Higher Education Act in 1965, allocated funding for some 125 university-based area-studies units known as National Resource Center programs at U.S. universities, as well as for Foreign Language and Area Studies scholarships for undergraduate students and fellowships for graduate students.

Meanwhile, area studies were also developed in the Soviet Union.

== Controversy within the field ==
Since their inception, area studies have been subject to criticism—including by area specialists themselves. Many of them alleged that because area studies were connected to the Cold War agendas of the CIA, the FBI, and other intelligence and military agencies, participating in such programs was tantamount to serving as an agent of the state. Some argue that there is the notion that U.S. concerns and research priorities will define the intellectual terrain of area studies. Others insisted, however, that once they were established on university campuses, area studies began to encompass a much broader and deeper intellectual agenda than the one foreseen by government agencies, thus not American-centric.

Arguably, one of the greatest threats to the area studies project was the rise of rational choice theory in political science and economics. To mock one of the most outspoken rational choice theory critics, Japan scholar Chalmers Johnson asked: Why do you need to know Japanese or anything about Japan's history and culture if the methods of rational choice will explain why Japanese politicians and bureaucrats do the things they do?

Following the demise of the Soviet Union, philanthropic foundations and scientific bureaucracies shifted their support away from area studies, instead emphasizing interregional themes such as "development and democracy". When the Social Science Research Council and the American Council of Learned Societies, which had long served as the national nexus for raising and administering funds for area studies, underwent their first major restructuring in thirty years, closing down their area committees, scholars interpreted this as a massive signal about the changing research environment.

== Fields ==
Fields are defined differently from university to university, and from department to department, but common area-studies fields include:

=== Africa ===
- African studies
  - Ethiopian studies (Abyssiniology)
  - North African studies
    - Berber studies (Berberology)
    - Coptology
  - Somali studies

=== Americas ===
- North and South American studies (Interamerican studies)
  - American studies (in the United States this has traditionally referred primarily to North America and especially the U.S.)
    - Appalachian studies
    - Southern studies
  - Canadian studies
    - Québec studies (see also Latin American studies)
  - Caribbean studies (see also Latin American studies)
  - Latin American studies (see also Iberian studies, Romance studies, Caribbean studies, and Québec studies)

=== Asia ===
- Asian studies and Oriental studies
  - Central Asian studies
    - Mongolian studies (also under East Asian studies)
    - Tibetan studies (Tibetology, also under South Asian or East Asian studies)
    - Turkology (Turkic studies, see also Turkish studies)
      - Uyghur studies (also under East Asian studies)
  - East Asian studies
    - Chinese studies (Sinology)
      - Hong Kong studies
      - Pekingology
      - Taiwan studies
    - Japanese studies (Japanology)
      - Ainu studies
      - Okinawan studies (Ryukyuan studies)
    - Korean studies (Koreanology)
      - North Korean studies
    - Manchu studies (Manchurology)
    - Miao studies (also under Southeast Asian studies)
    - Mongolian studies (also under Central Asian studies)
    - Tibetan studies (Tibetology, also under Central Asian or South Asian studies)
    - Uyghur studies (also under Central Asian studies)
    - Yi studies (also under Southeast Asian studies)
    - Zhuang studies (Zhuangology, also under Southeast Asian studies)
  - Middle Eastern studies (Near Eastern studies)
    - Arab studies
    - Caucasology (Caucasiology, also under European studies)
      - Abkhaz studies
      - Armenian studies (Armenology)
      - Chechen studies
      - Dagestan studies
        - Avar studies
      - Georgian studies (Kartvelian studies or Kartvelology)
      - Ossetian studies
    - Iranian studies (Iranology or Iranistics)
      - Persian studies
      - Kurdology (Kurdish studies)
    - Turkish studies (subfield of Turkology or Turkic studies, see also Central Asian studies)
      - Ottoman studies
      - Seljuk studies (Seljuq studies)
  - South Asian studies (Indology)
    - Bengali studies
    - Dravidian studies (Dravidology)
    - Pakistan studies (Pakistanology)
    - Sindhi studies (Sindhology)
    - Tibetan studies (Tibetology, also under Central Asian or East Asian studies)
  - Southeast Asian studies
    - Burmese studies
    - Indonesian studies
    - Khmer studies
    - Lao studies
    - Miao studies (also under East Asian studies)
    - Philippine studies (Filipinology or Philippineology)
    - Thai studies
    - Vietnamese studies (Vietnamology)
    - Yi studies (also under East Asian studies)
    - Zhuang studies (Zhuangology, also under East Asian studies)

=== Arctic ===
- Circumpolar studies (Northern studies)
  - Eskimology (Inuitology)

=== Europe ===
- European studies
  - Balkan studies (Balkanology)
    - Albanian studies (Albanology)
    - Hellenic studies
      - Byzantine studies (Byzantinology or Byzantology)
    - South Slavic studies (also under Slavic studies)
      - Bosnian studies (Bosniacistics)
      - Bulgarian studies (Bulgaristics)
      - Croatian studies (Croatistics)
      - Macedonian studies (Macedonistics)
      - Montenegrin studies (Montenegristics)
      - Serbian studies (Serbistics)
      - Slovene studies (Slovenistics)
      - Yugoslav studies (Yugoslavistics)
  - Baltic studies (Baltic Sea Region studies or Baltistics)
  - British studies
    - Anglo-Saxon studies
    - Cornish studies (also under Celtic studies)
    - Manx studies (also under Celtic studies)
    - Scottish studies (also under Celtic studies)
    - Welsh studies (also under Celtic studies)
  - Caucasology (Caucasiology, also under Middle Eastern studies)
    - Abkhaz studies
    - Armenology (Armenian studies)
    - Chechen studies
    - Dagestan studies
      - Avar studies
    - Georgian studies (Kartvelian studies or Kartvelology)
    - Ossetian studies
  - Celtic studies (Celtology)
    - Breton studies
    - Cornish studies (also under United Kingdom studies)
    - Irish studies
    - Manx studies (also under United Kingdom studies)
    - Scottish studies (also under United Kingdom studies)
    - Welsh studies (also under United Kingdom studies)
  - Central European studies
    - German studies (Germanistics or Germanics)
      - Austrian studies
    - Hungarian studies (also under Finno-Ugric studies)
    - West Slavic studies (also under Slavic studies)
      - Czech studies (Bohemistics)
      - Kashubian studies (Kashubistics)
      - Polish studies (Polonistics)
      - Slovak studies (Slovakistics)
      - Sorbian studies (Sorbistics)
  - Dutch studies (nl:Neerlandistiek)
  - Finno-Ugric studies (Finnougristics)
    - Finnish studies
    - Hungarian studies (also under Central European studies)
  - Romance studies (see also Latin American studies)
    - Aromanian studies
    - French studies
      - Occitan studies
    - Iberian studies (see also Latin American studies)
      - Basque studies (part of Iberian studies, but not Romance studies)
      - Catalan studies
      - Hispanism (Hispanic studies or Spanish studies)
      - Portuguese studies
    - Italian studies
    - Romanian studies
  - Scandinavian studies
  - Slavic studies (Slavonic studies or Slavistics)
    - East Slavic studies
      - Belarusian studies (Belarusistics)
      - Russian studies
        - Soviet and communist studies
          - Kremlinology
      - Rusyn studies (Rusynistics)
      - Ukrainian studies (Ukrainistics)
    - South Slavic studies (also under Balkan studies)
      - Bosnian studies (Bosniacistics)
      - Bulgarian studies (Bulgaristics)
      - Croatian studies (Croatistics)
      - Macedonian studies (Macedonistics)
      - Montenegrin studies (Montenegristics)
      - Serbian studies (Serbistics)
      - Slovene studies (Slovenistics)
      - Yugoslav studies (Yugoslavistics)
    - West Slavic studies (also under Central European studies)
      - Czech studies (Bohemistics)
      - Kashubian studies (Kashubistics)
      - Polish studies (Polonistics)
      - Slovak studies (Slovakistics)
      - Sorbian studies (Sorbistics)

=== Oceania ===
- Pacific studies
  - Australian studies
  - Hawaiian studies
  - New Zealand studies

=== Related fields ===
Other interdisciplinary research fields, such as women's studies, gender studies, disability studies, and LGBT studies, are not part of area studies but are sometimes included in discussions alongside it. There is significant overlap between area studies and ethnic studies, such as African American studies, Aramaic studies, Asian American studies, Chicano studies, Hebraic studies, Jewish studies, Latino studies, Mandaean studies, Native American studies, Romani studies, Semitic studies, and Syriac studies.

== Institutions ==
Some entire institutions of higher education (tertiary education) are devoted solely to area studies, such as the School of Oriental and African Studies of the University of London, the Tokyo University of Foreign Studies, or the German Institute for Global and Area Studies.

== See also ==
- Cultural studies – Academic field
- Ethnic studies – Interdisciplinary study of race, ethnicity and nationality's relationships with power
- Four traditions of geography – Proposed way to organize themes within geography
- IATIS
- Interdisciplinarity – Combination of two or more academic disciplines into one activity
- International studies – Study of relationships between states
- Library of Congress Country Studies – Series of creative works
- Regional geography – Branch of geography
