= Central European studies =

Central Europe per Geographie universelle (1927)

Central European studies is a subfield of European studies, focusing on the languages, cultures, histories, economies, societies, politics, international relations, and other aspects of the region of Central Europe. It is subject to many research institutions, academic journals, and educational qualifications. Its subfields include Austrian studies (German studies), Czech studies, Slovak studies, Polish studies, Hungarian studies, Slovenian studies, Croatian studies, among others.

== Education ==
Some academic institutions offer degrees, majors, minors, certificates, specializations, or other forms of educational qualifications to students.

=== Degrees/majors ===
- BA in Central European Studies, University of North Carolina at Chapel Hill
- BA in Central European Studies, Comenius University
- BA in Central European Studies, University of Southern California
- BA in Central European Studies, University of Manitoba
- BA in Eastern European and East Central European Studies, Heidelberg University
- BA and MA in Central European Studies, Masaryk University
- BA and MA in Central European Studies, Sorbonne University
- MA in Central European Studies, University of Hradec Králové
- MA in Central European Studies, Eötvös Loránd University
- MA in East and Central European Studies, Lund University
- MA(SocSci)/MA in Central & East European Studies, University of Glasgow
- MA in Balkan, Eurasian and Central European Studies (BECES), Charles University
- MA in Central and South-East European Studies, University College London

=== Certificates/minors ===
- Advanced Certificate in Central European Studies (MA level), Central European University
- Central European Studies Certificate, University of Pittsburgh
- East-Central European Studies Minor, University of Florida

=== Academic divisions ===
- Faculty of Central European Studies, Constantine the Philosopher University in Nitra
- Department of Central, Eastern and Northern European Studies (CENES), University of British Columbia

== Research ==
=== Research institutes ===
- Wirth Institute for Austrian and Central European Studies, University of Alberta
- Institute of Central European Studies, József Eötvös Research Centre
- East Central European Center, Columbia University
- Skalny Center for Polish and Central European Studies, University of Rochester
- Center for Baltic and East European Studies (CBEES), Södertörn University
- Center for European Studies, Maxwell School of Citizenship and Public Affairs
- Center for European Studies, University of Texas at Austin

=== Academic publications ===
- Zeitschrift Für Ostmitteleuropa-Forschung (Journal of East Central European Studies)
- Центральноевропейские исследования/Centralʹnoevropejskie issledovaniâ (Central-European Studies)
- Studies in Central European Histories (Brill)
- Central European History (Cambridge Core)
- Eastern and Central European Studies series (Peter Lang)
- Central European Studies series (Purdue University Press)

=== Professional associations ===
- International Council for Central and East European Studies, founded in 1974
- Central European History Society, founded in 1958 as a successor to the American Historical Association Committee for the Study of War Documents

== See also ==
- Baltistics
- Balkanology
