= Hrbek =

Hrbek (feminine Hrbková) is a Czech surname. Notable people with the surname include:

- Kent Hrbek (born 1960), American baseball player
- Michaela Hrbková (born 1987), Czech handball player
- Petr Hrbek (born 1969), Czech ice hockey player
- Sarah Hrbek (1878–1948), Czech American author and professor of Slavic literatures
