= Macedonist (disambiguation) =

Macedonist may refer to:

- An adherent of modern Macedonism
- A linguist, who is an expert of Macedonian studies

== See also ==
- Macedonianist (disambiguation)
- Ancient Macedonist
