= British Association for Slavonic & East European Studies =

British learned society

The British Association for Slavonic and East European Studies (BASEES) is a learned society in the United Kingdom dedicated to promoting the study of Russia, Eastern Europe and the former Soviet Union. It is a member of the Academy of Social Sciences.

It was formed in 1988 or 1989 through a merger of the British Universities Association of Slavists (BUAS; created 1956) and the National Association for Soviet and East European Studies (NASEES; created 1967, funded by the Ford Foundation and Shell), two founding members of the International Council for Central and East European Studies. Its first president until 1991 was the economist and foreign policy adviser Michael Kaser, who had also initially chaired the NASEES from 1967 to 1973. Until 1992, it was called the British Association for Soviet, Slavonic and East European Studies (BASSEES).
