= Michael Kaser =

British economist (1926–2021)

- Born: 2 May 1926; London, England
- Died: 15 November 2021 (aged 95)

Academic background
- Education: University of Cambridge
- Influences: A C Pigou, J M Keynes

Academic work
- Discipline: Socialist economics Transition economics Area studies
- School or tradition: Keynesian economics
- Notable ideas: Comecon (1965); Soviet Economics (1970)

Michael Kaser (2 May 1926 – 15 November 2021) was a British economist who specialised in Central and Eastern Europe and the USSR and its successor states. He was Reader Emeritus in Economics at the University of Oxford and Emeritus Fellow of St Antony's College, Oxford, and a Fellow of Templeton College, Oxford. He was also Honorary Professor in the School of Social Sciences at the University of Birmingham. In a trio of books published between 1965 and 1970 Kaser presented a detailed picture of the workings of the socialist planned economies at enterprise, national and international levels. His work sought to apply Keynesian economic theory to the analysis of the socialist planned economies and he identified the systemic problems that were neglected by the ruling communist parties, and which contributed to the disintegration of the economic system at the end of the 1980s.

== Life and career ==
His father Charles Kaser (1898–1983) was a French-speaking Swiss who settled in Britain as a banker and married an English woman Mabel (1891–1976), who had served on the staff of the UK Delegation to the Versailles Peace Conference. An early facility in the English and French languages was stimulated at home and by his Catholic-influenced political interests, to the extent that he learnt Serbo-Croatian to attend a youth conference in Zagreb and Belgrade in 1946, where he was one of the few non-communist speakers called to the podium. He attended Gunnersbury Catholic Grammar School and Wimbledon College in London, before going up to King's College, Cambridge. He completed the Economics tripos in two years, as required by wartime regulations, where his tutors were A C Pigou and Gerald Shove, and afterwards was directed to the Economics Section of the UK Ministry of Works, which was then planning the post-war house building programme. In 1947 he joined the economic research staff at the UK Foreign Office and served as Second Secretary, Commercial Secretariat, at the British Embassy in Moscow. A paper on Soviet price reform published in the Economic Journal (1950) led to an invitation onto the research staff of the United Nations Economic Commission for Europe in Geneva. Between 1951 and 1963 he participated in missions to five of the Soviet Republics and to all eight Central and East European states. He learnt Russian and Polish in the 1940s and 1950s and later added Albanian, Hungarian and Romanian. In Geneva, he met his wife Elizabeth (born 1925), a technical editor at the World Health Organization (married 1954) with whom he raised five children. He became Visiting Professor at the Graduate Institute of International Studies, affiliated with the University of Geneva, Switzerland (1959–63) and a visiting lecturer at the international business school INSEAD in Fontainebleau, France (1958–91).

When the British government funded an expansion of university posts in Soviet and Eastern European studies he gained an appointment (1963) at the University of Oxford jointly with a research fellowship at St Antony's College, then a center for regional studies and with close links into government. On his promotion to a University Readership in Economics (1972), the College elected him a Professorial Fellow. He served on and chaired many University Boards and committees, including the General Board of the Faculties. He served similarly at London, Birmingham and Reading universities. He held short- and long-term Visiting Lectureships and Professorships in the UK, Europe (Europa Institute, Amsterdam) and the United States (Universities of Michigan and Stanford). Other professional institutions on the committees of which he served included the Royal Economic Society, the Royal Institute of International Affairs and the International Committee for Slavonic and East European Studies. Government service over some forty years included frequent requests for consultancies from Ministries and from the House of Commons and in the mid-1980s briefing sessions for the Prime Minister. He participated in a meeting convened by the Prime Minister in 1984 ahead of a visit by Mikhail Gorbachev, following which Margaret Thatcher made her famous remark that "I like Mr. Gorbachev. We can do business together". From time to time he was also consulted for his expertise not only on the USSR and Eastern Europe, but also on health and education economics. He undertook work for many international organisations – several UN agencies, the European Commission, the International Monetary Fund, the European Bank for Reconstruction and Development and NATO – and industry, including Consolidated Gold Fields and the oil and gas companies ENI and Shell, and wrote regularly for the Economist Intelligence Unit and The Annual Register. He served on the editorial boards of four professional journals and three trusteeships: the Foundation of King George VI and Queen Elizabeth, known as Cumberland Lodge; Plater College, Oxford, then a Catholic adult education foundation; and the Keston Institute for the study of religion and communist countries, also based in Oxford at that time.

Kaser was influenced by his father's Social Christian values and joined the Liberal Party in 1945 at the General Election of that year. He was awarded the Order of St Gregory the Great by the Holy See in 1990 for his contribution to adult education at Plater College, Oxford. Under the presidency of Sali Berisha the government of Albania awarded him the Order of Naim Frashëri in 1995, and the Polish government recognised his contribution with the Knight's Cross, Order of Merit in 1999. He was instrumental in helping the Polish economist Włodzimierz Brus find a position at Oxford University after the latter was forced to leave Poland in 1972. He assisted numerous students from Eastern Europe in developing their academic careers.

Kaser was an acknowledged Western expert on the socialist countries and maintained good contacts with his peers in those countries, including many reformers. A thorough knowledge of data and sources together with inside information gave his publications weight. He contributed some 370 articles to scholarly journals, authored seven books and edited specialist and general works on economics, economic history, health economics and labour economics. He was the General Editor of the proceedings of the International Economic Association between 1986 and 2008.

Kaser withdrew from active involvement in academic and charitable work as he approached his 80th birthday. He died on 15 November 2021, at the age of 95.

== Research ==
Soviet Economics (1970) gives an overview of the economic system of the Union of Soviet Socialist Republics (USSR) from its foundation until the cautious economic reforms of Khrushchev and Brezhnev. The study examines the evolving political priorities of the communist party leadership in the context of the Marxist theoretical framework; the challenges of the Russian Civil War; foreign intervention and the 1941 invasion; post-war reconstruction; and the attempt to gain military and economic parity with the USA. At each point, Kaser describes how the internal dialogue between enterprises, consumers and the state apparatus influenced the strategies adopted for economic growth and agricultural and industrial development. Kaser highlights the contributions made to the internal debate by N. I. Bukharin, G. V. Plekhanov, E. A. Preobrazhensky, N D Kondratiev, A V Chayanov, V. G. Groman, L. V. Kantorovich, Y. G. Liberman, G. A. Feldman, V. V. Novozhilov, Branko Horvat and A. G. Aganbegyan. He is critical of the approaches of Western Marxists (for example, Paul A. Baran and Paul M Sweezy) and of Joan Robinson as presenting an over simplified picture of the way decision-making operated and of tending to conflate state ownership with control over resources. He argues that because the planning procedures had changed little since the first five-year plan (1928–32), enterprises were forced to engage in numerous deals over the composition and timing of their supplies and deliveries that in turn manifested itself in both chronic shortages and persistent waste. The "three laws of socialism" promulgated by Joseph Stalin, which in effect meant that heavy industry was given preference over the production of consumer goods, along with a high rate of saving and the maintenance of a stable proportion in the shares of national output between agriculture and industry, held back the growth of national income in comparison with market oriented industrial countries, notably the USA. Kaser explains how the invention of mathematical tools to achieve balance in a planned economy were swept aside under Stalin and continued to be viewed with suspicion until the 1960s. Even so, he doubts whether such computerised techniques could in practice generate efficient pricing and assure balanced growth and general economic equilibrium in the USSR.

In Planning in East Europe (1970) Kaser and Janusz G. Zieliński describe the management of industry in Eastern Europe as comprising typically several tiers of organisation: the central planning and control authorities, the enterprise or combination (or group) of enterprises, the material-technical supply organisations and the banks, and domestic retail and foreign trade organisations. The authors analyse the scope of planning and of markets, the tension between directives and competition, price-setting and the relations between managers and workers. The book covers the context and options for economic reform in Albania, Bulgaria, Czechoslovakia, Eastern Germany, Hungary, Poland, Romania and Yugoslavia.

In Comecon (second edition, 1967), Kaser presents the history and prospects of the Council for Mutual Economic Assistance (CMEA), or Comecon, which published the barest minimum about itself. The study includes extracts and summaries of the CMEA charter and principles, its internal organisation and procedures and its approach towards pricing, technical co-operation, investment and integration based upon specialisation and the division of labour within the socialist bloc. The political context of the CMEA's activities are set out, as are the theoretical considerations in which Kaser includes an extended discussion of the role of international and internal markets in the bloc's aim of "developing and consolidating a world economic system of socialism", and intended to include eventually the developing countries of Asia and Africa. Kaser highlights the difficulty facing an economy planned on a national basis has in integrating trading relations and foreign direct investment without devolving decision-making to enterprises and without establishing a clearing mechanism for transactions or introducing currency convertibility. He identifies as a key problem the contradictory objectives set for the CMEA of maintaining a balance of payments, cost-minimization and the development of domestic resources without providing for the transfer capital between richer and poorer CMEA members or the alignment of internal prices with world prices.

== Works ==
- Kaser, M C, Comecon: Integration problems of the planned economies, 1965, Second edition 1967 (Oxford University Press) ISBN 0-192-14956-3
- Kaser, M C, Soviet Economics, 1970 (World University Library / Weidenfeld & Nicolson) ISBN 0-303-17565-6
- Kaser, M C, Zieliński, J G, Planning in East Europe: Industrial management by the state, 1970 (Bodley Head) ISBN 0-370-00397-7
- Brown, A, Kaser, M C, The Soviet Union Since the Fall of Khrushchev, 1975, Second edition 1978 (Macmillan) ISBN 0-333-23337-9
- Brown, A, Kaser, M C, Soviet Policy for the 1980s, 1982 (Indiana University Press) ISBN 0-253-35412-9
- Brown, A, Kaser, M C, Smith, G S (editors), The Cambridge Encyclopedia of Russia and the Former Soviet Union, 1994 (Cambridge University Press) ISBN 0-521-35593-1
