= Bosnian studies =

Academic discipline concerned with the study of Bosnia and Herzegovina

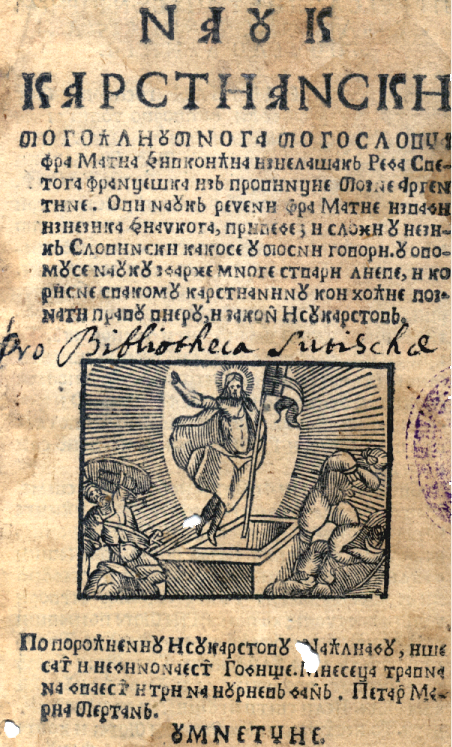
Divković's Nauk krstjanski, Venice, 1611

Bosnian studies or Bosnistics, (Bosnian/Croatian/Serbian: Bosnistika), in a broader sense, an academic discipline that studies Bosnia and Herzegovina and its inhabitants from various perspectives, including linguistic, literature, archaeology, history, ethnology, geography, economics, politics, culture, and others. In a narrower sense, it is a discipline that studies linguistic and literary production in the territory of Bosnia and Herzegovina. Therefore, it is also known as Bosnian or Bosnian-Herzegovinian philology, and together with Croatian, Montenegrin and Serbian studies, it forms Serbo-Croatian studies, which studies the Serbo-Croatian language and literature and belongs to Slavic studies.

== Bibliography ==
Bosnistika Plus is annual peer-reviewed journal that publishes academic research papers in all areas of linguistics in the field of Bosnian and Slavic studies and other disciplines; various contributions on language and literature, including assessments, reviews, book reviews and other. Papers in the journal are published in Bosnian, other South Slavic languages, and English. Publisher is Institute of Bosnian Language and Literature, Tuzla (Institut za bosanski jezik i književnost u Tuzli).

== See also ==
- Yugoslav studies
- Balkan studies
