= Pyotr Draganov =

Russian academic (1857–1928)

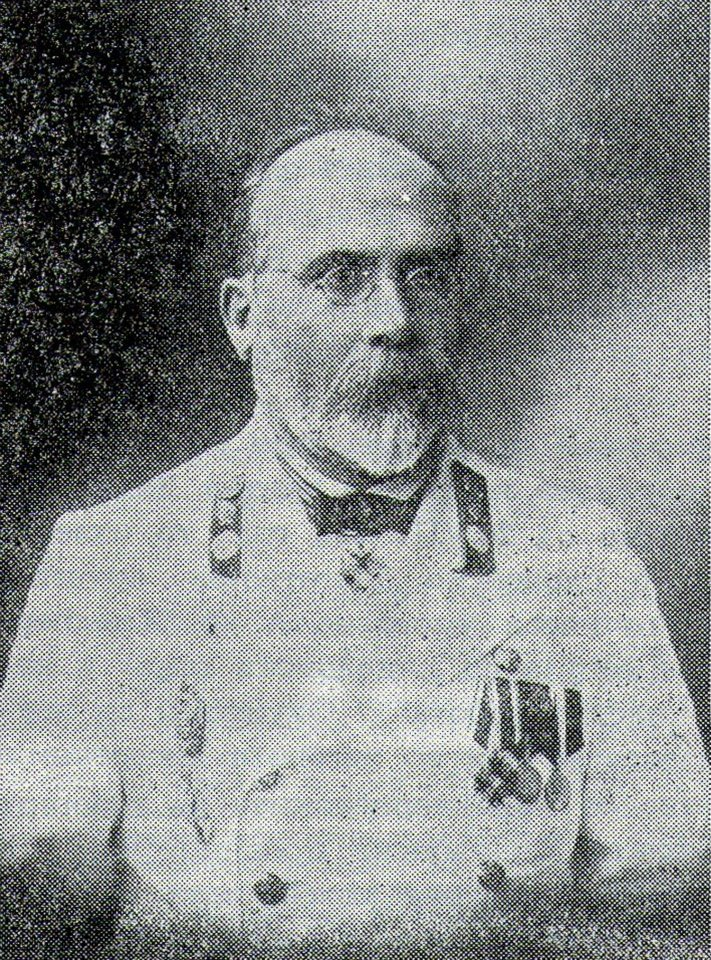
Pyotr Draganov in the 1910s

Pyotr Danilovich Draganov (Russian: Пётр Данилович Драганов; Bulgarian: Петър Данилович Драганов; Macedonian: Петар Данилович Драганов, romanized: Petar Danilovič Draganov; February 13 [O.S. February 1] 1857 – February 7, 1928) was a Russian philologist, teacher, historian, ethnographer and slavist of Bessarabian Bulgarian origin. He established Macedonian studies in Russia.

== Biography ==
Draganov was born in Comrat, Russian Empire (now part of Gagauzia, Moldova), in February 13 [O.S. February 1] 1857. He was of Bessarabian Bulgarian origin. Regarding his origin, Draganov wrote: "...by language and by tribe, on both my father's and mother's sides, as our family tree testifies, I belong to the purest Bulgarians from the depths of the Balkans". His daughter Angelina, in her biography of him in 1929, made at the request of the directorate of the Comrat Secondary School for Boys, wrote that Draganov "was Bulgarian by origin, Russian by upbringing and education". Draganov's lineage can be traced back to his maternal great-great-grandfather. His grandfather, great-grandfather, and great-great-grandfather were priests in the village Zherovna in southeastern Bulgaria. His great-grandfather was killed by the Turks in 1821 during the Greek War of Independence. In 1829, after the signing of the Treaty of Adrianople, the clerical family moved to Russia. Draganov's father, Bulgarian migrant in Bessarabia and agricultural worker, Dacho Kovanzhi Draganov (died in 1893), owned a vineyard in Comrat. The family was poor and his father lacked funds for the education of his three sons (including Pyotr), but they still received an education.

He graduated from the Bulgarian Central School in Comrat in 1875. Then he studied at the Chișinău progymnasium, the provincial gymnasium from 1875 to 1877 and the Kharkiv gymnasium from 1877 to 1880. After graduating from the gymnasium, as he was fascinated by history and geography, he entered the Faculty of History and Philology of the Imperial Kharkov University, studying there from 1880 to 1882. After visiting a brother in Plovdiv, Draganov published the newspaper South Bulgaria there in 1883. In Kharkiv, Draganov made translations from the Bulgarian language, and after completing his second year, he transferred to the St. Petersburg Imperial University. After passing the candidate's exams, in 1885, Draganov received the degree of candidate in Slavic philology, graduating from the Russian-Slavic Department of the Faculty of History and Philology. Throughout his years of study, Draganov constantly had unresolved financial problems. Unable to receive a Russian scholarship, he was forced to apply to the Bulgarian Ministry of Education in Sofia with a request for a scholarship, which granted him one until the end of his studies. After graduating from university, Draganov received a certificate as a teacher of gymnasiums and pre-gymnasiums with the right to teach Russian. From 1885 to 1887, he worked as a teacher in the Bulgarian Men's High School of Thessaloniki after he was invited by the Bulgarian Exarchate, where he taught general history, Church Slavonic and Bulgarian language and literature, Latin, geography, as well as a private course called "The Activities of Cyril and Methodius". In the same period, on the recommendation of his professor Vladimir Lamansky, Draganov researched Macedonia. With the help of his students from various cities in Ottoman Macedonia, such as Skopje, Bitola, Voden, Kukush, etc., he collected folklore, linguistic and ethnographic material, from which he then published the first (of three parts) collection of epic folk songs called Macedonian-Slavic Collection with an Attached Dictionary.

In May 1887, Lamansky invited him to write a dissertation on the topic of Macedonia, as he was aware of Draganov's interest in it. In 1887, Draganov returned to Comrat, then went to Saint Petersburg. In Russia, he set the foundations of Macedonian studies. He stayed there until July 1888. Draganov again returned to Comrat, where he took up the position of teacher of Russian language and literature at the newly opened Comrat Real School. At the same time, he also worked as the school's librarian. He continued his bibliographical work. In 1890, he transferred to the Sevastopol Real School, and from 1895 he taught Russian at the Kishinev Girls' Gymnasium. On May 29, 1890, in Odessa, he married Anastasia Vasilyevna Tchaikovskaya (born 1868), a native of Orhei, the daughter of a provincial secretary, and a graduate of the Kishinev Girls' Gymnasium. Anastasia was mentally ill and died in a hospital in Saint Petersburg in 1899. They had two children: Angelina and Valentin.

On January 1, 1896, Draganov was hired as a junior assistant librarian in the Manuscript Department of the Imperial Public Library (now the National Library of Russia), where he worked on Slavic literature and Galician-Russian books. He oversaw the acquisition of literature from "Galician-Russian, Little Russian, and all Serbian and Bulgarian lands." Draganov's modest salary as an assistant librarian was insufficient to support his family, so on October 25, 1904, he requested to be transferred to a position as a Russian-language teacher at the Comrat Real School, where he returned. In 1906, Draganov worked as an inspector at the Real School in Astrakhan. In 1907, he worked as a teacher at the Bolhrad Girls' Gymnasium. In the same year, he remarried, but was widowed again in 1914. At the end of 1908, he became the director of a school in the German colony of Rovnoye. In 1913, Draganov was appointed as a director of a boys' gymnasium in the city of Cahul. He became a state councilor, and his services were honored with the Order of Saint Stanislaus (2nd and 3rd class), Order of Saint Anna (2nd class), and Order of Saint Vladimir (4th class). After the Romanian occupation of Bessarabia in 1918, the Romanian authorities issued a decree to preserve the gymnasium. Draganov was offered the opportunity to remain as the director but he refused and returned to Comrat, where he taught Bulgarian at the Comrat Real School until his retirement in 1926. He died on February 7, 1928, in Comrat.

== Work, views and legacy ==
Draganov authored over 100 historical, literary, ethnographic, philological, bibliographic and critical works. Most of Draganov's studies have Bessarabian and Balkan themes. His articles of historical and philological content were published in the News of the Department of Russian Language and Literature of the Imperial Academy of Sciences, Russian Philological Bulletin, Russian Bulletin and other periodicals. Draganov's New Work on the Ethnography of the Macedonian Slavs was based on the French-language book by A. Ofeikov (pseudonym of Atanas Shopov, Bulgarian diplomat and scholar) La Macedoine au point de vue ethnographique, historique et philologique (Macedonia from an ethnographic, historical and philological point of view). The first part of his work titled Macedonian-Slavic Collection, was published in 1894 in Volume XXII of the "Notes of the Imperial Russian Geographical Society for the Department of Ethnography" and as a separate reprint. The collection was controversial in Russia and the South Slavic countries. As a result, the publication of the collection was not continued. Draganov was a compiler of Pushkiniana in 50 foreign languages. Apart from knowledge in almost all Slavic languages, he also knew Romanian, Greek and Latin.

From 1895, he compiled a Bulgarian-Russian dictionary. However, the loss of a significant portion of the completed work prevented him from completing it on time, and in 1906 the Council of the Slavic Charitable Society hired another researcher to compile the dictionary. He also failed to complete his long-planned General Cyril and Methodius Bibliography for the Last Thousand Years, Up to and Inclusive of the 19th Century. Draganov was a member of the Imperial Russian Geographical Society, Imperial Russian Archaeological Society, a member-associate of the Imperial Society of lovers of ancient writing, and the Publishing Commission of the St. Petersburg Slavic Society. Ethnographer Kuzman Shapkarev criticized his ethnographic research, writing:

Let us be allowed to notice that His Lordship (Draganov), as any reader clearly sees, bases the entire structure of his ethnographic essay almost exclusively on information drawn from 12-15 year old students, so that, since there were not many students in the gymnasium from the northwestern part of the Kosovo vilayet who could provide him with “samples of Bulgarian folk poetry”, His Grace concludes from this that there were no Bulgarians there, but only Albanians and Serbs… But is this how authoritative and serious ethnographers do it, or do they go from place to place, visually examine, carefully search and study what they want to be sure of, and then summarize it in print.

Draganov argued that the Macedonian Slavs are a distinct Slavic ethnic group, have a distinct culture and the Macedonian dialects form a separate language. Per Bulgarian academic Grigor Grigorov, his theses were not unanimously accepted in Saint Petersburg and Bulgaria, and his articles on the Macedonian issue sparked polemics in Russian academic circles, with Draganov being accused of having inadequate knowledge of the Macedonian vernacular. According to academics Tchavdar Marinov and Alexis Heraclides, the Russian Empire was trying to find a balance between Bulgarian and Serbian influence in Ottoman Macedonia then, and thus it accepted the idea that the Macedonian Slavs were neither Serbs nor Bulgarians.

After World War II, his daughter Angelina moved to Hunedoara, Romania, and his son Vladimir lived his life in Saint Petersburg. Since 1994, the Central Library of Gagauzia has been named after him.
