= Charles E. Townsend (linguist) =

American Slavist and linguist (1932–2015)

- Born: September 29, 1932; New Rochelle, New York
- Died: June 7, 2015 (aged 82)

Charles Edward Townsend (September 29, 1932 – June 7, 2015) was an American Slavicist and linguist who served as chair of the Department of Slavic Languages and Literatures at Princeton University from 1970 until his 2002 retirement and who authored several well-regarded works on the Russian and Czech languages as well as on Slavic linguistics.

== Early life and education ==
Townsend was born in New Rochelle, New York, and grew up in rural Vermont. After attending Trinity School (New York City) in New York City on a football scholarship, he was accepted to Yale University where he studied German. Graduating magna cum laude in 1954, he then spent a year studying at Bonn University on a Fulbright scholarship.

Having deferred military service during this time, he entered the U.S. Army upon his return from Bonn. Townsend made full use of the Russian course at the Army Language School in Monterey, California, and graduated top of his class. This was followed by a period of service in the Counterintelligence Corps in Nuremberg, West Germany.

His military service now completed, Townsend was again free to pursue his studies, earning a master's in Soviet area studies from the University of Harvard in 1960 followed by a Ph.D. in Slavic languages and literatures in 1962. During this time he studied under scholars Roman Jakobson and Horace G. Lunt, intellectual giants whose linguistic work and thought he would later expand upon in his own analyses of the Russian language as a system. Jakobsen reportedly suggested the topic of his dissertation, The Language of the Memoirs of the Princess Natal'ja Dolgorukaja's writings, which was later published as a book and has been called a "pioneering document" in the study of autobiography and gender in the Russian context.

== Career and impact ==
Whilst at Harvard Townsend began his teaching career and, by the time of his departure, held the position of Assistant Professor. In 1966 he moved to the Department of Slavic Languages and Literatures at Princeton, of which he became chair in 1970. He held this position until his retirement in 2002. In addition to linguistics he also taught courses on Russian, Czech, Polish, Serbo-Croatian, Bulgarian and Old Church Slavonic. Townsend also spent stints as a visiting lecturer in the US, China, Czech Republic, Germany, Great Britain, the Netherlands and Russia.

Over the course of his career, Townsend developed a strong interest and faculty in the Czech language and spent several of his sabbaticals in Prague, witnessing the Prague Spring and Warsaw Pact invasion of Czechoslovakia during his first stay in 1968. He wrote several books on Czech linguistics and lectured widely on the topic, coming to be regarded as one of North America's leading Bohemists. His linguistic description of the spoken Prague norm came at a delicate but crucial time: the Communist regime in 1980s Czechoslovakia eyed the spoken language with deep suspicion and local linguists stayed away from the topic for the most part. In recognition for his contributions to the study of the Czech language, Townsend was made an honorary member of the elite Czech Linguistic Society in 1994. He was also a founding member of the National Association of Teachers of Czech (later renamed International Association of Teachers of Czech) and led a team to create the six-volume Czech individualised instruction program for Ohio State University.

During his lifetime Townsend published widely on topics in Slavic languages and linguistics, authoring nine books and over a hundred scholarly articles in all. He made several noteworthy contributions to his fields with a critical edition of Princess Dolgorukaya's memoir, monographs on Russian morphology, Spoken Prague Czech, as well as a comparative analysis of the Slavic languages which was translated into German in 2002 and Korean in 2011. Townsend was also active in peer-review, serving on the boards of publications such as the Slavic and East European Journal, the Russian Language Journal, and Studies in Functional and Structural Linguistics. Peers have praised Townsend's brilliant mind and described his striving to employ the insights of linguistic analysis to further enrich and inform language pedagogy. In 2002 the editors of Where One's Tongue Rules Well: A Festschrift for Charles E. Townsend wrote the following:

It may be stated without fear of contradiction that Professor Charles E. Townsend of Princeton University has been the most influential writer on Russian and Slavic grammar in the United States.

== Legacy ==
Following his retirement, Townsend donated an enormous collection of books to the Department of Slavic Languages and Literatures at Princeton University. The some one thousand dictionaries, grammars, monographs, and other works form the core of the present Departmental Library.

In 2015 a memorial fund was established by the Slavic Linguistics Society to "honor and perpetuate his memory by recognizing young contributors to the field of Slavic linguistics"

== Awards and honors ==
- "Distinguished Contribution to the Profession Award" (American Association of Teachers of Slavic Languages and Literatures)
- Honorary membership (Czech Linguistic Society)
- Where One's Tongue Rules Well: A Festschrift for Charles E. Townsend

== Bibliography ==
- Townsend, Charles E. (1970). Continuing With Russian. McGraw-Hill. ISBN 0-89357-085-0.
- Townsend, Charles E. (1975) [First published 1968]. Russian Word Formation. Slavica. ISBN 978-0-89357-023-1.
- Townsend, Charles E. (1977). The Memoirs of Princess Natal'ja Borisovna Dolgorukaja. Columbus, OH: Slavica. ISBN 978-0893570446.
- Townsend, Charles E. (1990). A Description of Spoken Prague Czech. Slavica. ISBN 978-0-89357-211-2.
- Townsend, Charles E. (1993). Russian Readings for Close Analysis: with grammatical materials and tables. Kendall Hunt. ISBN 978-0840385871.
- Townsend, Charles E.; Laura A. Janda (1996). Common and Comparative Slavic: Phonology and Inflection with special emphasis on Russian, Polish, Czech, Serbo-Croatian, and Bulgarian. Slavica. ISBN 978-0-89357-264-8.

- Translated into German: Townsend, Charles E.; Laura A. Janda (2002). Gemeinslavisch und Slavisch im Vergleich: Einführung in die Entwicklung von Phonologie und Flexion (Slavistische Beiträge) (in German). Kubon & Sagner. ISBN 978-3876908311.

- Townsend, Charles E.; Eric S. Komar (2000) [First published 1981]. Czech Through Russian (2nd ed.). Slavica. ISBN 978-0-89357-291-4.
- Townsend, Charles E.; Laura A. Janda (2002) [First published 2000]. A Comprehensive Grammar of Czech (PDF). Durham, NC: The Slavic and Eurasian Language Resource Center (SEELRC), Duke University.
