= Božidar Vidoeski =

Macedonian linguist (1920–1998)

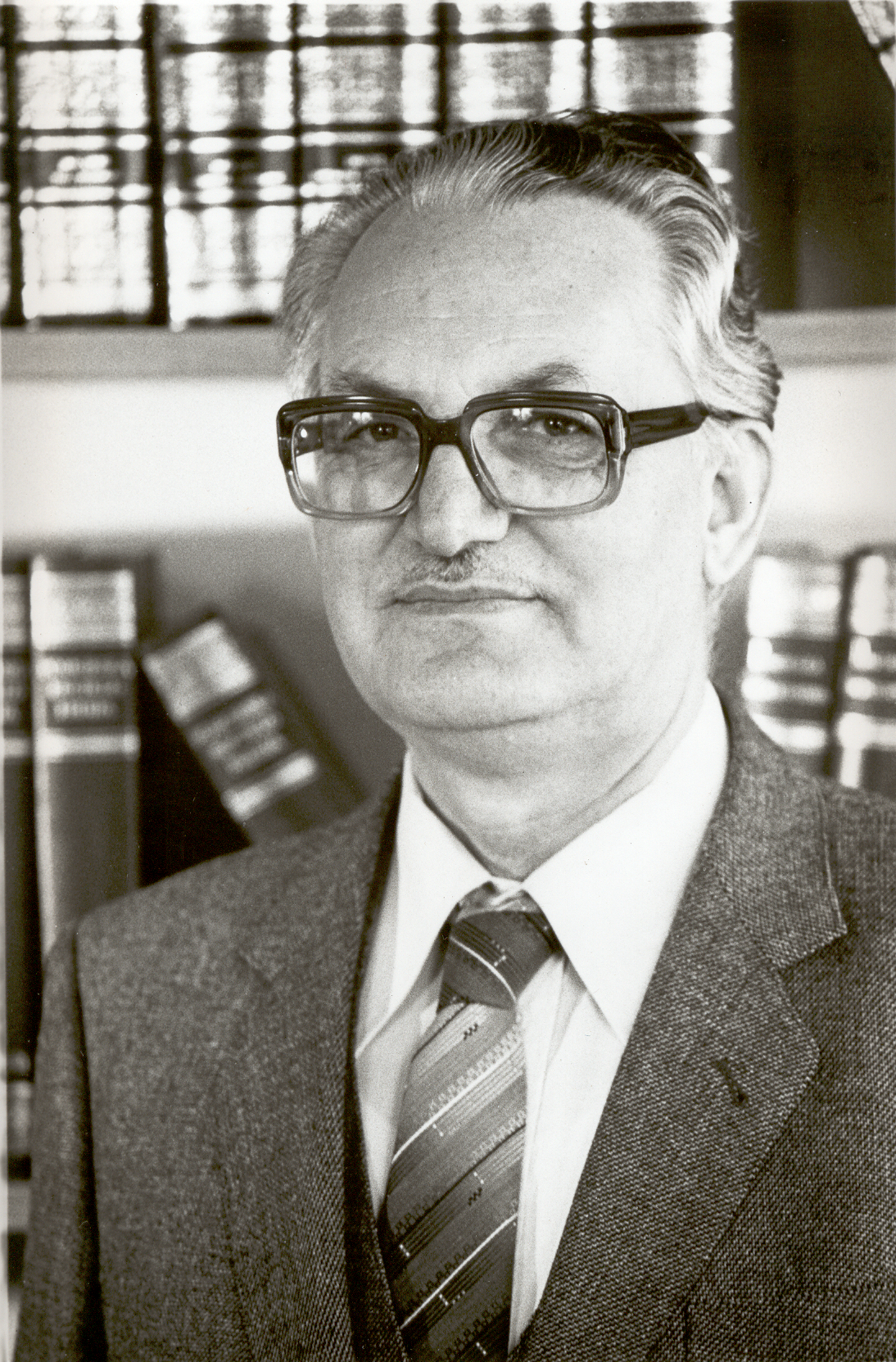
- Born: Božidar Vidojević; 8 November 1920; Zvečan, Kingdom of Serbs, Croats and Slovenes (now North Macedonia)
- Died: 16 May 1998 (aged 77); Sremska Kamenica, Federal Republic of Yugoslavia (now Serbia)
- Occupation: Linguist

Božidar "Božo" Vidoeski (8 November 1920 – 16 May 1998; Macedonian: Божидар "Божо" Видоески) was a Macedonian linguist and the founder of Macedonian dialectology.

== Biography ==
Božidar Vidoeski was born with the surname Vidojević on 8 November 1920 in Zvečan, then in South Serbia, part of Kingdom of Serbs, Croats and Slovenes. After studying in Prilep, Kragujevac and Skopje, he studied Russian philology at the Belgrade University under Serbian linguist Aleksandar Belić. During the World War II in Yugoslav Macedonia, he supported the Serbian Chetnik movement of Draža Mihajlović, and at the end of the war he switched to the side of the Yugoslav partisans. Afterwards Vidoeski studied Macedonian philology at the Skopje University under Macedonian linguist Blaže Koneski. He graduated in 1949 from Skopje and immediately became an assistant at the Department of Macedonian and South Slavic languages there. After that year, he was also the author of a number of articles and monographs on Macedonian dialectology and comparative Slavic philology. In 1950, he was one of the founders of the journal Makedonski jazik (Macedonian Language), as well as its editor from 1973 to his death. In 1953 he was a researcher at the Krste Misirkov Institute for the Macedonian Language in Skopje, where he later founded and directed the dialectology and onomastics sections. In 1957, he obtained his doctorate under Koneski. In 1958/1959, Vidoeski specialized in Slavic philology at Warsaw University and taught Macedonian language courses in Warsaw and Cracow. He later became a professor at the St. Cyril and Methodius University in Skopje. Along with Koneski, he was active in international Slavist networks.

His geographical placement of the Macedonian dialects in dialectological maps was resented in Bulgarian academic circles, who noted that the dialectal area presented by him, entered deep into Bulgarian, Greek and Albanian territory. They accused Vidoeski of having plagiarized the bibliographical works of M. Mazhdrakova (1905), Hr. Gerchev (1911) and St. Stoykov (1937) under the title "Appendix to the Bibliography of the Macedonian Language" (1953). He became a member of the Yugoslav Academy of Sciences and Arts in 1962 and Macedonian Academy of Sciences and Arts in 1974. In the 1980s, he was an editor of the dictionary Osnoven sistem (Basic system), about Slavic onomastics. Vidoeski retired in 1986. In 1994, he joined the Polish Academy of Sciences and Arts and the Serbian Academy of Sciences and Arts in 1997. He died on 16 May 1998 in Sremska Kamenica, Federal Republic of Yugoslavia (now in Vojvodina autonomous region of Serbia). After his death, in 2013, Bulgarian researcher Georgi Mitrinov criticized him for having falsified the data about the Bulgarian population in Macedonia from Bulgarian ethnographer Vasil Kanchov by replacing the ethnonym "Bulgarians" with "Macedonians" in his work Фонолошки бази на говорите на македонскиот јазик ('Phonological Bases of the Dialects of the Macedonian Language').

== See also ==
- Macedonian studies
- Historiography in North Macedonia
