= Canadian Slavonic Papers =

Canadian Slavonic Papers / Revue canadienne des slavistes
- Discipline: Central and Eastern European studies
- Language: English, French
- Edited by: Rolf Hellebust and James Krapfl

Publication details
- Former names: Études slaves et est-européennes; Slavic and East-European Studies
- History: 1956-present
- Publisher: Taylor & Francis on behalf of the Canadian Association of Slavists (Canada)
- Frequency: Quarterly
- Impact factor: 1.6 (2024)

Standard abbreviations
- ISO 4: Can. Slavon. Pap.

Indexing
- ISSN: 0008-5006 (print); 2375-2475 (web)
- LCCN: 2011234668
- JSTOR: 00085006
- OCLC no.: 898820708

Links
- Journal homepage; Online access; Online archive

Canadian Slavonic Papers / Revue canadienne des slavistes is a peer-reviewed, interdisciplinary academic journal devoted to problems of Central Europe, Eastern Europe, Russia, Central Asia, and the Caucasus. It is the official journal of the Canadian Association of Slavists and published on its behalf by Taylor & Francis. The co-editors are Rolf Hellebust and James Krapfl. Articles are in English or French.

== Abstracting and indexing ==
The journal is abstracted and indexed in:

- EBSCO databases
- Emerging Sources Citation Index
- FRANCIS
- International Bibliography of the Social Sciences
- Linguistic Bibliography/Bibliographie Linguistique
- MLA International Bibliography
- ProQuest databases
- Scopus
