= Caribbean Studies =

Caribbean Studies may refer to:

- The study of the Caribbean islands, the Caribbean people, the Caribbean Community or the Caribbean Sea
- Caribbean Studies (journal), a journal published by the University of Puerto Rico and the research institute which publishes it

== See also ==
- Caribbean (disambiguation)
