= Studies in Slavic and General Linguistics =

Studies in Slavic and General Linguistics (SSGL) (ISSN 0169-0124) is an academic book series that was founded in 1980 by A.A. Barentsen, B.M. Groen and R. Sprenger and is published by Rodopi.

SSGL is mainly devoted to the field of descriptive linguistics. Although SSGL is primarily intended to be a means of publication for linguists from the Low Countries, the editors are pleased to accept contributions by linguists from abroad. SSGL appears at irregular intervals, but the editors aim at bringing out on average one volume a year.

== Editors ==
Egbert Fortuin
Peter Houtzagers
Janneke Kalsbeek

== Editorial Advisory Board ==
R. Alexander (Berkeley), A.A. Barentsen (Amsterdam), B. Comrie (Leipzig), B.M. Groen (Baarn), F.H.H. Kortlandt (Leiden), W. Lehfeldt (Göttingen), J, Schaeken (Leiden), G. Spieß (Cottbus), W.R. Vermeer (Leiden).

== Volumes ==
Volumes include:

- # 41. Innovation in Tradition: Tönnies Fonne's Russian-German Phrasebook. (Pskov, 1607). By Pepijn Hendriks. ISBN 978-90-420-3830-1 E-ISBN 978-94-012-1075-1
- # 40. Dutch Contributions to the Fifteenth International Congress of Slavists. Minsk.August 20–27, 2013. Linguistics. Edited by Egbert Fortuin, Peter Houtzagers, Janneke Kalsbeek and Simeon Dekker. ISBN 978-90-420-3818-9 E-ISBN 978-94-012-1065-2
- #39. Selected Writings on Slavic and General Linguistics. By Frederik Kortlandt. ISBN 978-90-420-3363-4 E-ISBN 978-94-012-0060-8
- #38. Language Contact in Times of Globalization. Edited by Cornelius Hasselblatt, Peter Houtzagers and Remco van Pareren. ISBN 978-90-420-3343-6 E-ISBN 978-94-012-0043-1
- #37. Accent Matters. Papers on Balto-Slavic accentology. Edited by Tijmen Pronk and Rick Derksen. ISBN 978-90-420-3332-0 E-ISBN 978-94-012-0032-5
- #36. The Slovene Dialect of Egg and Potschach in the Gailtal, Austria.By Tijmen Pronk. ISBN 978-90-420-2774-9
- #35. Stressing the past. Papers on Baltic and Slavic accentology. Edited by Thomas Olander and Jenny Helena Larsson. ISBN 978-90-420-2555-4
- #34. Dutch Contributions to the Fourteenth International Congress of Slavists. Ohrid, September 10–16, 2008. Linguistics. Edited by Peter Houtzagers, Janneke Kalsbeek and Jos Schaeken. ISBN 978-90-420-2442-7
- #33. Evidence and Counter-Evidence. Essays in Honour of Frederik Kortlandt. Volume 2: General Linguistics. Edited by Alexander Lubotsky, Jos Schaeken and Jeroen Wiedenhof. With the assistance of Rick Derksen and Sjoerd Siebenga. ISBN 978-90-420-2471-7
- #32. Evidence and Counter-Evidence. Essays in Honour of Frederik Kortlandt. Volume 1: Balto-Slavic and Indo-European Linguistics. Edited by Alexander Lubotsky, Jos Schaeken and Jeroen Wiedenhof. With the assistance of Rick Derksen and Sjoerd Siebenga. ISBN 978-90-420-2470-0
- #31. Nicolaas van Wijk, (1880-1941). Slavist, linguist, philanthropist. By Jan Paul Hinrichs. ISBN 978-904-202-023-8
- #30. Dutch Contributions to the Thirteenth International Congress of Slavists. Ljubljana, August 15–21, 2003. Linguistics. Edited by Jos Schaeken, Peter Houtzagers and Janneke Kalsbeek. ISBN 978-90-420-0847-2
- #29. Govor derevni Ostrovcy Pskovskoj oblasti, by Zep Honselaar. ISBN 978-90-420-1444-2
- #28. Languages in Contact, Edited by Dicky Gilbers, John Nerbonne and Jos Schaeken. ISBN 978-90-420-1322-3

== See also ==
- Slavistics
