= Macedonianism =

Macedonianism may refer to:

- Macedonian nationalism, a social movement of ethnic Macedonians
- Pneumatomachi or Semi-Arians, a 4th-century anti-Nicene Christian sect

== See also ==
- Macedonist (disambiguation)
