= Macedonian studies =

Study of the Macedonian language

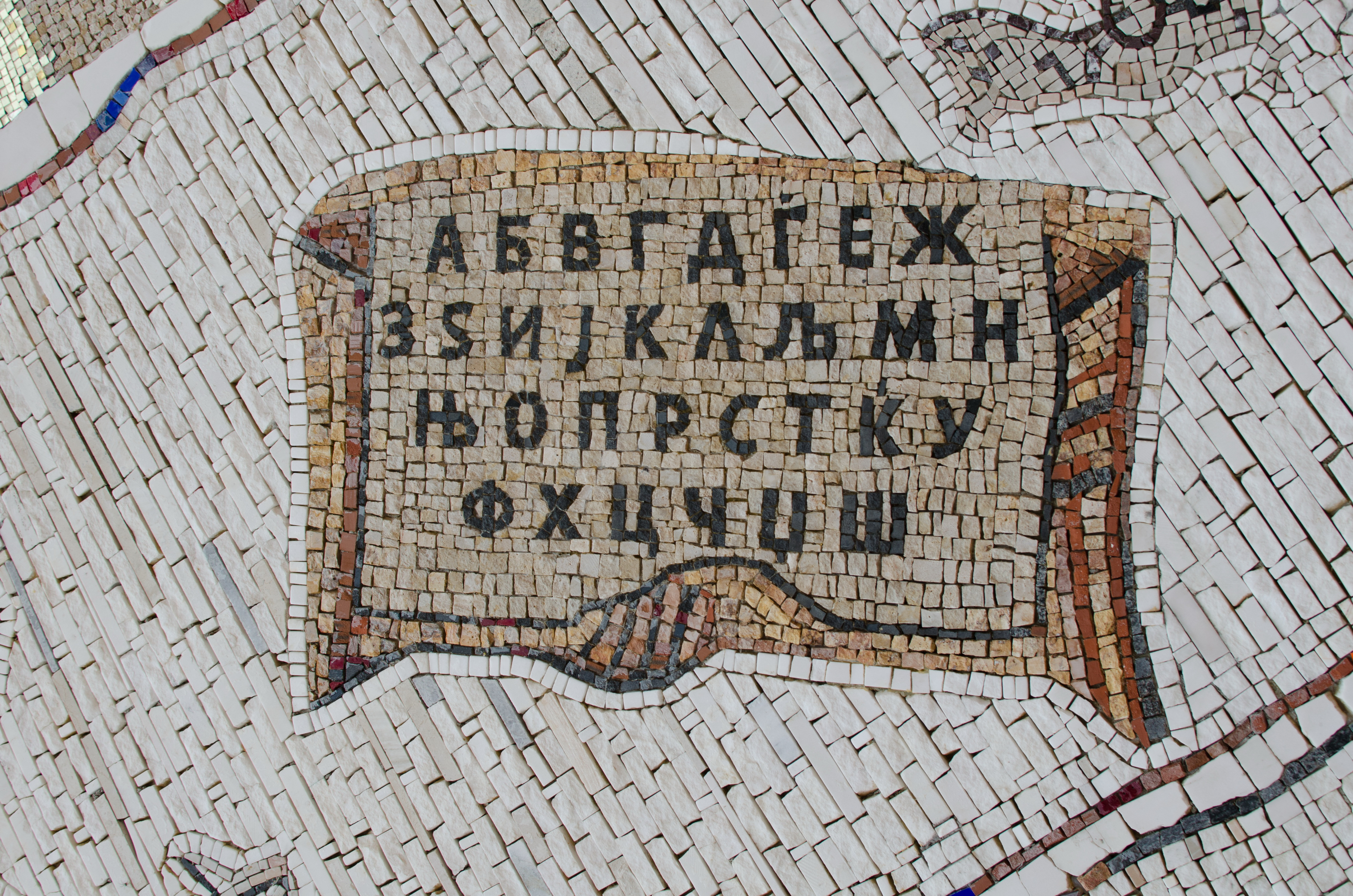
Macedonian alphabet at the ASNOM Memorial Center.

Macedonian studies (Macedonian: Македонистика, romanized: Makedonistika) is an academic discipline within Slavic studies that focuses on the comprehensive study of the Macedonian language, literature, history, and culture. As part of Slavic studies, it falls within the subgroup of South Slavic languages and cultures. Apart from North Macedonia, Macedonian Studies is also taught at universities worldwide, including in Albania, Canada, Poland, the United States, and post-Yugoslav countries. A linguist who studies Macedonian as part of the field is called a Macedonist (Macedonian: Македонист, romanized: Makedonist).

== Historical and institutional development of the discipline ==
=== Late Ottoman era ===
One of the first linguistic publications researching the Slavic Macedonian dialects was the book of the Russian linguist of Bulgarian origin Petar Draganov, the compiler of the "Macedonian-Slavic Collection" (1894), with which he founded the Macedonian studies in the Russian Empire. During his stay as a teacher at the Bulgarian Men's High School in Thessaloniki, Draganov had collected folklore material there, which he published in this collection. According to him, the Slavic Macedonian dialects constituted a distinct language. Another early linguistic work dedicated on the Slavic Macedonian dialects was done by the Austro-Hungarian linguist from Slovenian background Vatroslav Oblak (1864 – 1896). Oblak visited in 1891-1892 the area north of Thessaloniki and studied the Suho village dialect. He found that in the local Slavic, spoken by the "Bulgarian peasants", the broad enunciation of the Yat vowel was preserved. As a result, in 1896 Oblak published his book Macedonische Studien. In 1903 Krste Misirkov published in Sofia the pamphlet Za makedonckite raboti which was the first attempt to formalize a separate Macedonian language. Misirkov outlined an overview of the Macedonian grammar and expressed the ultimate goal of codifying this language. The author proposed to use the Prilep-Bitola dialect as a dialectal basis for the formation of the future standard. His ideas however were not adopted until the mid-1940s.

=== Post-WWII development ===
The discipline of Macedonian studies experienced significant development after the codification of the Macedonian language in 1945 in Socialist Federal Republic of Yugoslavia, particularly under the umbrella of Yugoslav studies. As part of the Socialist Republic of Macedonia within Yugoslavia, academic institutions in Macedonia contributed to the advancement of Macedonian studies. Macedonian educators such as Nikola Berovski were sent to Albania following the war. The first lecture on the Macedonian language at a foreign university was held in 1946 at Charles University in Prague in Czechoslovakia by Professor Antonín Frýnta. He taught Macedonian language courses from 1946 to 1948. This marked the breakthrough of Macedonian studies at foreign universities. In 1958 and 1959, Macedonian linguist Božidar Vidoeski taught Macedonian language courses in Warsaw and Kraków. In Soviet Union, Russian linguist Rina Usikova completed her doctoral studies and defended her dissertation in the field of Macedonian studies under the mentorship of Samuil Bernstein and with support of Blaže Koneski in 1965. American linguist Horace Lunt, who was sent to Macedonia by Harvard University for fieldwork and was funded by the Yugoslav authorities for his work, contributed to the development of the field in U.S. universities.

Krste Misirkov Institute for the Macedonian Language marked 25 years of its work in 1977 by establishing a new journal Makedonistika specialized for Macedonian studies. Macedonian language departments beyond SR Macedonia were established in Paris in 1973, Bucharest and Kraków in 1974, Moscow 1975, Istanbul in 1985. The field of Macedonian studies in Hungary developed around the work of Paszkál Gilevszki and Zoltán Csuka with number of lectures and publications appearing in the country from 1980s onwards. The city of Rijeka in former Yugoslavia developed into an important center of Macedonian studies. Faculty of Humanities and Social Sciences at the University of Rijeka introduced Macedonian studies in its Slavic studies curriculum in 1982. With the breakup of Yugoslavia, the department initially limited its activities with transformation of Yugoslav studies department into Croatian studies, yet the activities were continued and developed via subsequent collaboration with Ss. Cyril and Methodius University of Skopje and St. Clement of Ohrid University of Bitola. Among other universities in former Yugoslavia, University of Ljubljana initiated Macedonian studies in 1961/1962 as a part of their Serbo-Croatian studies.

== Macedonian specialists ==
- Dalibor Brozović
- Pyotr Draganov
- Victor Friedman
- Blaže Koneski
- Christina Kramer
- Horace Lunt
- Krste Misirkov
- Božidar Vidoeski
- Zuzanna Topolińska

== See also ==
- Political views on the Macedonian language
- Eastern South Slavic
- Slavic dialects of Greece
