= International Council for Central and East European Studies =

The International Council for Central and East European Studies (ICCEES) is an international network of researchers in the field of Russian, Central and East European studies.

== History ==
The ICCEES was founded as International Committee for Soviet and East European Studies (ICSEES) in September 1974 at a conference in Banff in Canada by the British Universities Association of Slavists (BUAS), the National Association for Soviet and East European Studies (NASEES), the American Association for the Advancement of Slavic Studies (AAASS), and the Canadian Association of Slavists (CAS).

By 1978, the programme committee invited individual scholars from the Eastern Bloc to participate in the ICCEES's world congress of 1980, while asking for support from the academies of sciences in respective countries. The consultation visit of a delegation from the Soviet Academy of Sciences to West Germany in the spring of 1980 failed to establish common ground and the academic institutions of the Soviet bloc subsequently announced their refusal to join the congress. 18 scholars from Yugoslavia, Poland, China, Romania, and Hungary attended in contravention of the boycott.

== Members ==
=== Full ===
- Associazione Italiana degli Slavisti (AIS), Italy
- Australasian Association for Euro-Asian Studies (AAEAS) (Note: The organisation was created in January 2025 through a merger of the Australasian Association for Communist and Post-communist Studies or AACaPS, itself a successor of the Australasian Association for the Study of Socialist Countries founded in 1975, and the Australia and New Zealand Slavists' Association or ANZSA, founded in 1967.)
- British Association for Slavonic and East European Studies (BASEES; a successor of both BUAS and NASEES)
- Canadian Association of Slavists (CAS)
- Chinese Association for Russian, East European and Central Asian Studies (CAERCAS)
- German Association for East European Studies (DGO)
- Finnish Association for Russian and East European Studies (FAREES)
- Irish Association for Russian, Central and East European Studies (IARCEES)
- Japan Council of Russian and East European Studies (JCREES)
- Kazakh Association for Eurasian, Russian and Central Asian Studies (AERCAS)
- Korean Association of Slavic and Eurasian Studies (KASEUS)
- Mongolian Association for Central and Eastern Studies (MACEES)
- Société française d’études russes et est-européennes en sciences sociales (SFERES), France
- South-East Europe Society (SOG), Germany.
- Swedish Society for the Study of Russia, Central and Eastern Europe and Central Asia

=== Associate ===
- Institute of Russian History, Russian Academy of Sciences
- Leuven International and European Studies (LINES), Belgium
- N.N. Miklukho-Maklai Institute of Ethnology and Anthropology, Russian Academy of Sciences (IEA)

=== Past ===
- Asociacion Española de Eslavistas, Spain (associate member)
- Association for Slavic, East European, and Eurasian Studies (ASEEES), USA (ceased paying dues in 2017 and formally withdrew its membership in 2020; no pertinent cause was given)
- Association Hellénique d'Études Slaves (AHES), Greece
- Association of East and Central European Studies of the Czech Republic (associate member)
- Centre Belge d'Études Slaves (SBES), Belgium
- Dutch Slavists' Association (DSA)
- Institut d'Études Slaves (INES), France
- Institute of Political Studies of the Polish Academy of Sciences (associate member)
- Institute of Philosophy and Sociology of the Polish Academy of Sciences (associate member)
- Israeli Association of Slavic and East European Studies (IASEES)
- Korean Institute of International Studies (KIIS), Korea
- Österreichisches Ost- und Südosteuropa-Institut (ÖOSI; disbanded)

== Activities ==
The ICCEES's chief activities are a biannual newsletter as well as a congress organized every five years.

The ICCEES's International Information Centre, which publishes the biannual International Newsletter, was established at the University of Glasgow in 1975 through a grant from the Ford Foundation. It later received support from the Volkswagen Foundation, the French Ministry of External Relations (1984–1986), the Bank of Sweden Tercentenary Foundation, and the Sasakawa Peace Foundation of Japan.

There have been ten world congresses of the ICCEES as of 2025: in Banff (1974), Garmisch-Partenkirchen (1980), Washington, D.C. (1985), Harrogate (1990), Warsaw (1995), Tampere (2000), Berlin (2005), Stockholm (2010), Makuhari (2015) and Montreal (2021).

== Archives ==
There is an International Council for Central and East European Studies fonds at Library and Archives Canada. The archival reference number is R3997.
