= Kenneth Naylor =

- Born: Kenneth E. Naylor, Jr. February 27, 1937; Philadelphia, Pennsylvania, U.S.
- Died: March 10, 1992 (aged 55); Columbus, Ohio, U.S.
- Occupations: Linguist and slavist

Kenneth E. Naylor Jr. (February 27, 1937 – March 10, 1992) was an American linguist and Slavist, one of the leading experts on Serbo-Croatian and South Slavic languages in general.

== Biography ==
Naylor received his A.B. degree in French linguistics from Cornell University in 1958 and A.M. in General Linguistics from Indiana University Bloomington in 1960. At Indiana University, he began to study Slavic with professor Edward Stankiewicz, who became his mentor and close friend.

When Stankiewicz moved to the University of Chicago, Naylor followed him. There, after studying in Novi Sad, Yugoslavia, under a Yugoslav Government Exchange Fellowship and an NDFL Title VI Fellowship for Serbo-Croatian from the United States government, he received his doctorate in Russian and South Slavic linguistics in 1966.

He served as an assistant professor at the University of Pittsburgh from 1964 to 1966, and began teaching Slavic linguistics at the Ohio State University in 1966. At the time of his death in 1992, he was the Acting Director of the Center for Slavic and East European Studies at Ohio State.

== Work ==
Naylor received numerous awards, grants, and fellowships from many sources, including the American Council of Learned Societies, the Fulbright program, and the countries of Bulgaria and Yugoslavia, from which he was awarded medals of honor (the Jubilee Medal and the Order of the Yugoslav Flag with Golden Wreath, respectively). In 1982, under the auspices of the Fulbright-Hays Program, he held a Senior Lecturership as a guest professor at the University of Novi Sad. In 1990, he testified before the United States House of Representatives, Foreign Affairs Committee, on ethnic rivalry in Yugoslavia and the development of the Serbo-Croatian language.

His research centered on the Serbo-Croatian language and on South Slavic languages in general, but especially in their Balkan context. He edited two volumes of The American Bibliography of Slavic and East European Studies (1967 and 1968/1969), was guest editor of Volume 1 of Folia Slavica (1977), and was co-editor of Slavic Linguistics and Poetics: Studies for Edward Stankiewicz on his 60th Birthday (Slavica, 1982). In addition, he served as editor of the journal Balkanistica, producing the first five volumes (1975–1977, 1980, and 1981). The overwhelming majority of his 100-plus articles, reviews, and edited works focused on Serbo-Croatian and Balkan linguistics, with several notable and much quoted ones among them.

A collection of 18 of his most important papers on Serbo-Croatian and Balkan sociolinguistics, translated into Serbo-Croatian, was published posthumously in Belgrade, under the title Sociolingvistički problemi među Južnim Slovenima (Prosveta, 1996), containing as well an overview of his life by Milorad Radovanović and an appreciation of his scholarly career by Pavle Ivić.

== Legacy ==
In his honor, the Kenneth E. Naylor Professorship of South Slavic Linguistics was created officially on November 5, 1993, at The Ohio State University. Brian Joseph was the first Kenneth E. Naylor Professor of South Slavic Linguistics. In June 2024, Sunnie Rucker-Chang inherited the chair.

The first Naylor Lecture was delivered on May 28, 1998, by Victor Friedman, Professor and Chair of the Department of Slavic Languages and Literatures at the University of Chicago, who spoke on the subject of Linguistic Emblems and Emblematic Languages: On Language as Flag in the Balkans. The success of that lecture led to the idea of making it public beyond the reaches of the audience on that day, and thus was born the Kenneth E. Naylor Memorial Lecture Series in South Slavic Linguistics.

A carefully polished and more fully developed version of Professor Friedman's lecture was published in 1999 as the first number in the series. The second publication in this series came in 2000, by Ronelle Alexander, Professor of Slavic Languages and Literatures at the University of California, Berkeley, entitled In Honor of Diversity: The Linguistic Resources of the Balkans. Wayles Browne, Professor of Linguistics at Cornell University and the third Naylor lecturer on May 19, 2000, published for the first time a paper he wrote in Croatian in 1973 on a subject that Naylor himself had written on, namely accent classes of the Serbo-Croatian noun, especially as revealed through loanwords.

== Sources ==
- Radovanović, Milorad (1994). "Kenneth E. Naylor (1937–1992)". Južnoslovenski filolog (in Serbian) (50). Институт за српски језик САНУ: 280.
- "Kenneth E. Naylor Professorship". Department of Slavic and East European Languages and Cultures. November 5, 1993.
- "Kenneth E. Naylor Memorial Lecture Series". SEESA Website.
- Naylor, Kenneth (1996). Sociolingvistički problemi među Južnim Slovenima (in Serbo-Croatian). Beograd: Prosveta.
