= Scando-Slavica =

- Discipline: Slavic and Baltic studies
- Language: English, Russian, German etc.
- Edited by: Susanna Witt

Publication details
- History: 1954–present
- Publisher: Taylor & Francis/Routledge on behalf of the Association of Scandinavian Slavists and Baltologists
- Frequency: Biannually

Standard abbreviations
- ISO 4: Scando-Slavica

Indexing
- ISSN: 0080-6765 (print); 1600-082X (web)

Links
- Journal homepage

Scando-Slavica is a biannual peer-reviewed academic journal covering Slavic and Baltic studies. It was established in 1954 and is published by Taylor & Francis on behalf of the Association of Scandinavian Slavists and Baltologists. Its first editor-in-chief was the Danish slavist Adolf Stender-Petersen.

== Abstracting and indexing ==
The journal is abstracted and indexed in Emerging Sources Citation Index and Scopus.
