= Bohemism =

Words and expressions of Czech origin

Bohemisms, or Czechisms, are words and expressions borrowed or derived from the Czech language. The former term is derived from the historical name Bohemia for Czech lands.

The best known Bohemisms are robot and polka.

Many Bohemisms related to church and liturgy entered the Polish language in the Middle Ages during the Christianization of Poland, under the influence of Moravian and Bohemian traditions. Many of them ultimately originated from Latin, the language of the Catholic liturgy.

The analysis of Bohemisms is a significant argument of the Edward L. Keenan's hypothesis about the authorship of The Tale of Igor's Campaign.

== See also ==
- Bohemistics
- Czenglish
- List of English words of Czech origin
