= Brian Joseph =

American linguist (born 1951)

- Born: November 22, 1951 (age 74)

Academic background
- Education: Yale University (A.B.); Harvard University (A.M., PhD)

Academic work
- Discipline: Linguist
- Sub-discipline: Historical linguistics; Language contact; Greek linguistics; Albanian linguistics; Balkan linguistics; Morphological theory
- Institutions: Ohio State University

Brian D. Joseph (born November 22, 1951) is an American linguist specializing in historical linguistics. He is a Distinguished University Professor of Linguistics and the Kenneth E. Naylor Professor of South Slavic Linguistics at Ohio State University. His research interests include language change, Greek, Albanian, and general Balkan linguistics, and morphological theory. He was elected a Member of the American Philosophical Society in 2019.

== Early life and education ==
Joseph was born in New York City on 22 November 1951. He received an Bachelor of Arts, cum laude in linguistics from Yale University in 1973, with a minor in classics. During 1971–72, he studied in Athens, Greece, as part of a junior-year abroad program. He later attended Harvard University, earning an A.M. in linguistics in 1976 and a Ph.D. in linguistics in 1978. His doctoral dissertation, Morphology and Universals in Syntactic Change: Evidence from Medieval and Modern Greek, was based in part on dissertation research conducted in Greece during 1976–77.

== Career ==
=== Ohio State University ===
After a year at the University of Alberta (September 1978 – August 1979) as an Izaak Walton Killam Memorial Post-doctoral Fellow, he moved to Ohio State University, where he has spent his entire professional career, retiring in June 2024 and becoming Professor Emeritus. He became associate professor in 1985 and professor in 1988. From 1987 to 1997, he served as chair of the Department of Linguistics. In 1997, he was appointed Kenneth E. Naylor Professor of South Slavic Languages and Linguistics, a position jointly held between the Department of Linguistics and the Department of Slavic and East European Languages and Cultures.

Joseph was the Vice-President of the Linguistic Society of America in 2018 and served as the organization's President in 2019 (actually from January 2019 to January 2020). He was previously President of the North American Association for the History of the Language Sciences and currently serves as co-editor of the Journal of Greek Linguistics, a journal he helped to found in 2000.

=== Visiting appointment ===
Joseph has held numerous visiting and instructional appointments internationally, including positions at the Linguistic Society of America summer institutes at the University of California, Santa Cruz; Michigan State University; the University of Illinois; and the University of Chicago. He has also taught or lectured at institutions including the University of Canterbury in New Zealand, Karl-Franzens University Graz in Austria, the University of Pavia, the University of the Basque Country, the University of Copenhagen, the University of the Aegean, and the Università per Stranieri di Siena.

His teaching and research have focused particularly on Balkan linguistics, historical linguistics, language contact, morphology, and sociolinguistics.

=== Research and scholarships ===
Joseph's research has focused on Balkan linguistics, Greek linguistics, historical linguistics, language contact, morphology, and syntactic change. His scholarship has addressed topics including infinitive loss in the Balkan languages, grammatical categories, complementizers, finiteness, and sociolinguistic variation in Greek.

=== Selected presentations ===
Joseph has presented invited lectures and conference papers internationally since the 1980s, including presentations at institutions and conferences in the United States, Greece, and the United Kingdom on topics related to Balkan linguistics, Modern Greek, grammatical theory, and historical syntax. He was invited at:

- University of Reading (1984)
- Athens Ministry of Education

== Selected bibliography ==
- Joseph, Brian D. (1983). The Synchrony and Diachrony of the Balkan Infinitive: A Study in Areal, General, and Historical Linguistics.
- Joseph, Brian D.; Philippaki-Warburton, Irene (1987). Modern Greek. Croom Helm.
- Joseph, Brian D.; Janda, Richard D.; Vance, Barbara S. (2003). The Handbook of Historical Linguistics. Wiley-Blackwell.
- Joseph, B. D.; Hock, H. H. (2009). Language history, language change, and language relationship: An introduction to historical and comparative linguistics. Mouton de Gruyter.
- Friedman, Victor A.; Joseph, Brian D. (2025). The Balkan Languages. Cambridge University Press.

== Articles ==
- Janda, Richard D.; Joseph, Brian D. (2003). "Reconsidering the canons of sound-change". Amsterdam Studies in the Theory and History of Linguistic Science: 147.
- Joseph, Brian D. (2000-03-01). "Is there such a thing as "grammaticalization?"". Language Sciences. 23 (2–3). Pergamon: 163–186. doi:10.1016/S0388-0001(00)00020-6.
- Joseph, Brian D.; Janda, Richard D. (1988). "The How and Why of Diachronic Morphologization and Demorphologization". Theoretical Morphology. pp. 193–210. doi:10.1163/9789004454101_014. ISBN 978-90-04-45410-1.

== Personal life ==
Joseph is married and has two children and three grandchildren.
