= Slovak studies =

Study of Slovak language, culture and history

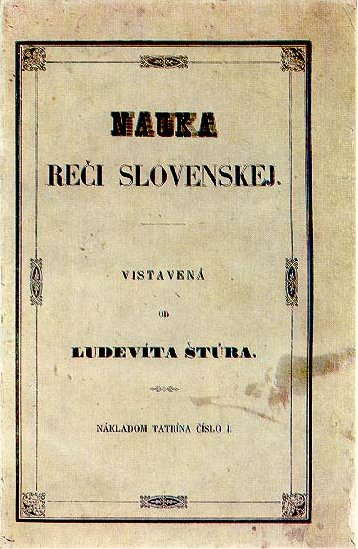
Nauka reči slovenskej by Ľudovít Štúr

Slovak studies or Slovakistics (Slovak: Slovakistika, Czech: Slovakistika, German: Slowakistik) is an academic discipline within Slavic studies which is focused on the study of the Slovak language, literature, history and culture.

The beginnings of Slovak studies date back to the 18th century, when a concentrated and systematic description of the Slovak language, Slovak literature and Slovak history began. At the beginning, it was a complex scientific field, which gradually differentiated into Slovak linguistics, literary studies and history.

== History ==
=== History of Slovak studies abroad ===
Scientific interest in Slovak studies in the Russian Empire developed in the 19th century with the Moscow State University, Saint Petersburg State University and the Institute for Slavic Studies of the Russian Academy of Sciences becoming the major centres of the field in Russia. Slavic Department at the Faculty of Philology at the Moscow State University introduced specialization in Slovak language and literature in 1949.

With Slovak language enjoying the official status in the Socialist Autonomous Province of Vojvodina, SFR Yugoslavia became important centre for the Cold War era Slovak studies abroad. Michal Filip was the first joint lector for Czech and Slovak languages at the University of Belgrade from academic year 1952-1953. Study of Slovak language and literature was introduced at the University of Novi Sad in 1961 and an independent department for Slovakistics was opened in 1972.

The first Slovak lectureship at the Jagiellonian University in Polish People's Republic was organized within the framework of Slavic Studies in 1958, and in 1994 an independent Department of Slovak Philology was established. Slovak has been taught at the University of Silesia in Katowice since 1975 as well, first as a second language within the Czech studies program and as an additional, third Slavic language within the then Yugoslav studies program.

Following the dissolution of Czechoslovakia, an important centre in the development of Slovak studies as a field distinguished from Bohemistics in Czech Republic was Masaryk University in Brno where after 1993 were transferred to general Slavic studies department. Separate Cabinet of Slovak Studies at the Charles University in Prague was established in 1994 as well when it was separated from the framework of Bohemian studies.

== See also ==
- Slavic studies
- Central European studies
