= Caribbean (disambiguation) =

The Caribbean is a region centered on the Caribbean Sea in the Americas.

Caribbean may also refer to:

== Arts and entertainment ==
- Caribbean (novel), an historical novel by James A. Michener
- The Caribbean, first book in the series Pirates of the Caribbean: Legends of the Brethren Court
- Caribbean (board game), a 2004 board game
- The Caribbean (band), an American experimental pop group
- Caribbean (1953 film), a drama film
- Caribbean Gold, a 1952 American pirate film also known as Caribbean

== Other uses ==
- Caribbean cuisine, a blend of cuisine found in the Caribbean / West Indies
- Caribbean Airlines, based in Trinidad and Tobago
- Caribbean Cinemas, a chain of movie theatres in Puerto Rico and the Caribbean
- Packard Caribbean, a luxury convertible made during the 1950s

== See also ==
- Caribbean English, the dialect of British English spoken in the Caribbean/West Indies
- Caribbean Star Airlines, based in Antigua and Barbuda
- Caribbean Sun Airlines, based in Puerto Rico it is the sister airline of Caribbean Star
- Royal Caribbean International, a cruise ship agency based in the United States
- Caribbean stud poker, a casino table game
