= Serbian studies =

Academic discipline concerned with the study of Serbia

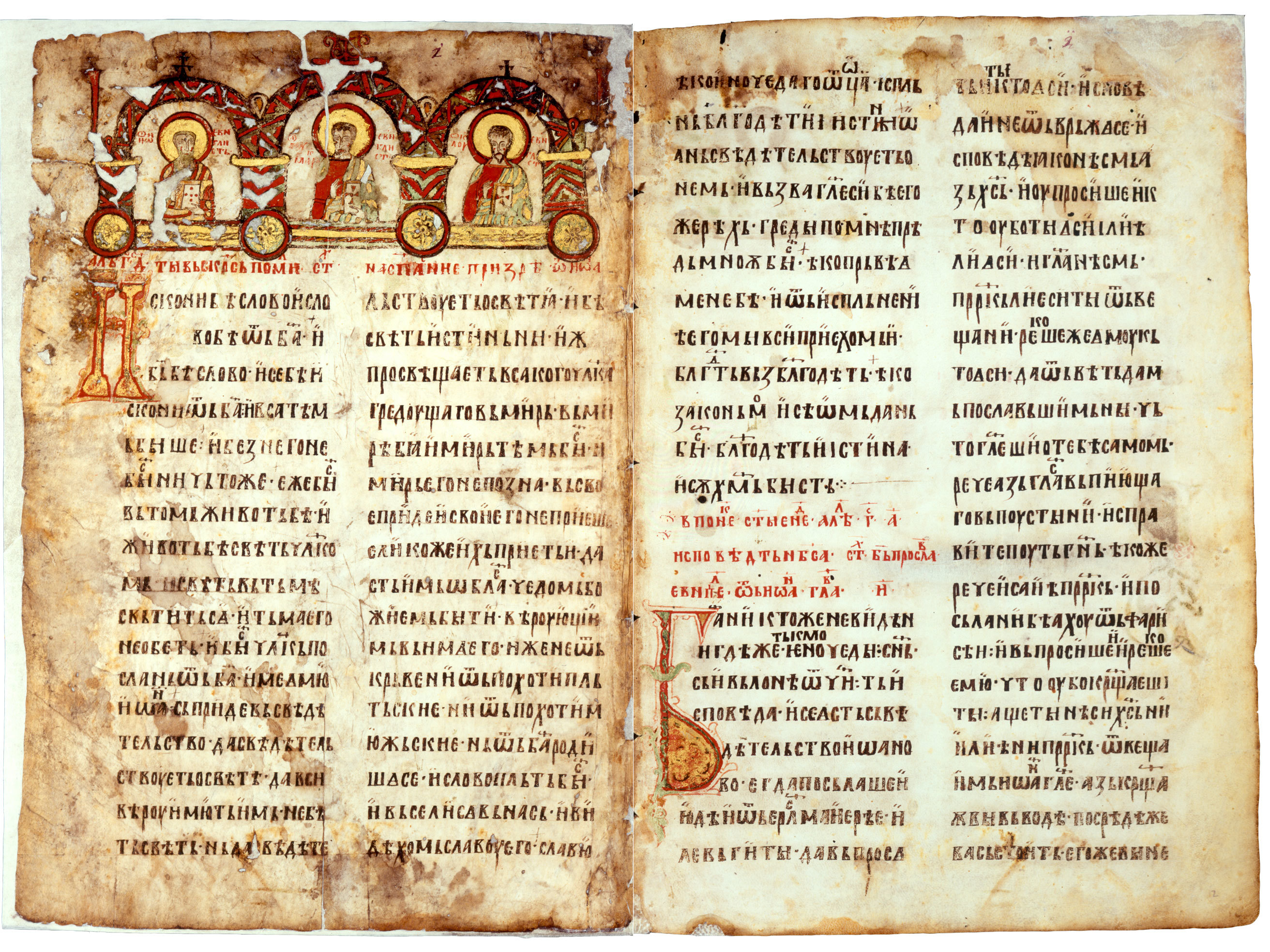
The "Miroslav's Gospel" - Serbian medieval manuscript from the 12th century

Serbian studies or Serbistics (Serbian: Србистика / Srbistika, German: Serbistik, Latin: Serbistica, Polish: Serbystyka, Greek: Σερβικές Σπουδές) is an academic discipline within Slavic studies which is focused on the study of Serbian language, literature, history and culture. Within Slavic studies it belongs to the South Slavic subgroup.

== History ==
Throughout the 19th and most of the 20th century the field of Serbian studies developed within the framework of Yugoslav or Serbo-Croatian studies. Before the creation of Yugoslavia there were certain reservations and disagreements both among Croat and Serb conservative elites on the need to create a standardised Serbo-Croatian language and literature or the ways to achieve such a unity. At the time, interest in scientific research of the Serbian language, literature and history had already developed. Srpski rječnik, a dictionary written by Vuk Stefanović Karadžić and published in 1818, was the first known dictionary of the reformed Serbian language. Some of the earliest centres of the development of scientific interest in Serbian studies were Matica srpska established in 1826 in Budapest and moved to Novi Sad in 1864, as well as the Society of Serbian Letters established in 1841. The existence of an independent Serbian state at the time enabled the provision of state support for the development of the field. In 1858 the government of the Principality of Serbia funded the publication of Serbian Syntax by Đura Daničić.

At the same time, some of the major national cultural institutions and a large part of the Serb population lived in the Austrian Empire where the spread of liberal, radical, and national ideologies in the region influenced by Illyrianism, Pan-Slavism or Austro-Slavism, and opposed to the Austrian Empire's absolutism, pushed South Slavic intellectuals toward closer cooperation. Vienna Literary Agreement between writers from Croatia, Serbia and Carniola on a standardized Serbo-Croatian language was reached in March 1850.

The creation of Yugoslavia in 1918 marked the victory for Yugoslavist ideology with the new royalist regime promoting unitarism and centralisation of the country all influencing further development of umbrella disciplines of Serbo-Croatian and Yugoslav studies. Serbian language, literature, history and culture were at the time studied as a part of such a wider discipline. During the interwar period discipline further developed beyond the region and German-speaking Central Europe. The University of Bucharest Department of Slavic Studies established in 1891 was in its early years marked by lectures in Yugoslav literature where Romanian linguist Anton B. Balotă worked after defending his doctoral thesis in Belgrade under Aleksandar Belić mentorship. Research in the field of Yugoslav studies in the United Kingdom was shaped by the work of Robert Seton-Watson, Harold Temperley and Carlile Aylmer Macartney as well as prominent academic institutions such as the UCL School of Slavonic and East European Studies in particular.

After the end of World War II in Yugoslavia new socialist republic was federalised and interwar unitarisation efforts were discontinued. In 1954, 25 Serbian, Croatian and Bosnian writers, linguists and intellectuals reached the Novi Sad Agreement balancing unity and ethnic and linguistic diversity. Discipline continued to develop abroad throughout that time. The founder of Serbian and Croatian studies in Italy was Arturo Cronia. The North American Society for Serbian Studies was established in 1978 and the first issue of its journal Serbian Studies was published in 1980.

The breakup of Yugoslavia led to state sponsored reaffirmation of particular areas of studies such as Croatian, Bosnian and Montenegrin studies. The Serbian academic community nevertheless showed significantly less interest in carving out Serbian studies distinct from Serbo-Croatian studies which led to dissatisfaction in some circles. Dissatisfaction was articulated and organised in 1997 when 63 University of Pristina scholars initiated a movement for the reconstruction of Serbian studies, convinced that a similar initiative would not be possible at the University of Belgrade or the University of Novi Sad.

In late 2025 the Government of Serbia led by Đuro Macut and faced at the time with mass student protests, announced the establishment of the Faculty of Serbian Studies at the University of Niš. The initiative was marked by controversies and some commentators compared it to the establishment of the Faculty of Croatian Studies at the University of Zagreb in the 1990s during Franjo Tuđman regime.

== Main centers ==
Main centers of Serbian studies are situated in Serbia, mainly in Belgrade, and also in Novi Sad. A specialized faculty in Belgrade, called the Research Center for Serbian Studies was created in 2010 within the Department of History (Faculty of Philosophy, University of Belgrade. Various programs in Serbian studies are also taught at universities in Bosnia and Herzegovina, Montenegro, Croatia and some other European and North American countries. The North American Society for Serbian Studies (NASSS) is active since 1978. Its journal, called the Serbian Studies has reached the 28th volume. Special programs in Serbian studies are organized at the Columbia University.

== See also ==
- Serbian Academy of Sciences and Arts
- Cultural Heritage of Serbia
- Matica srpska
- Slavic studies
- Yugoslav studies

== Sources ==
- Ćirković, Sima (2004). The Serbs. Malden: Blackwell Publishing. ISBN 9781405142915.
- Ivić, Pavle, ed. (1995). The History of Serbian Culture. Edgware: Porthill Publishers. ISBN 9781870732314.
- Pavlowitch, Stevan K. (2002). Serbia: The History behind the Name. London: Hurst & Company. ISBN 9781850654773.
- Samardžić, Radovan; Duškov, Milan, eds. (1993). Serbs in European Civilization. Belgrade: Nova, Serbian Academy of Sciences and Arts, Institute for Balkan Studies. ISBN 9788675830153.
