= List of English words of Czech origin =

This is a list of words coming to English from or via Czech, or originating in the Lands of the Bohemian Crown, often called Czech lands. Words and expressions derived from the Czech language are called Bohemisms.

- Absurdistan (in Czech Absurdistán) – word created by Eastern Bloc dissidents, passed into English mainly through works of Václav Havel.
- Dollar – from Czech tolar (taler), a silver coin used in the Czech lands since the 15th century.
- háček – a diacritical mark, literally "little hook", e.g. č is letter c having háček. Also known as "caron".
- howitzer – from houfnice, a 15th-century Hussite catapult; houf meaning crowd or band
- kolache – from koláč or koláček.
- koczwarism – Sexual asphyxiophilia in medical slang; after František Kočvara
- polka – from Polák or polský, a Czech dance named in remembrance of the November Uprising of 1830; or from Půlka, in English half because of its tempo
- pram – from Czech prám, a flatbottomed boat, through Dutch praam and Middle Dutch praem
- robot – from Czech robot (machine resembling a human being), introduced in Karel Čapek's play R.U.R. from the 1920s.
- Semtex – a plastic explosive named after Semtín, part of the city of Pardubice, Czech Republic, location of its manufacturer.
- Slivovice (Slivovitz), plum brandy – from Czech word slíva (plum)

Sometimes it is mistakenly claimed hocus-pocus has Czech origin since pokus means trial (attempt) or experiment.

== See also ==
- Lists of English words of international origin
