= Dutch studies =

Dutch studies may refer to:

- the academic study of Dutch culture and language (Neerlandistiek)
- Japanese Rangaku
