= Zuzanna Topolińska =

Polish linguist (born 1931)

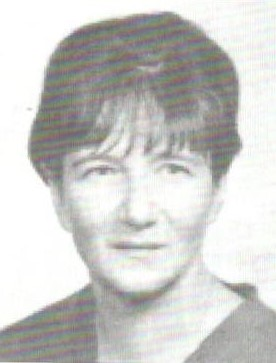
- Born: 21 January 1931 (age 95); Warsaw, Poland

Zuzanna Topolińska (born 21 January 1931) is a Polish linguist, Slavist and Macedonist.

== Biography ==
Zuzanna Topolińska was born in Warsaw into an intellectual family. Her father was a historian, before the war he worked as a program director at Polish Radio. She passed her high school diploma in 1948 at the Gymnasium of Królowej Jadwigi in Kielce.

Topolińska took up Polish studies at the University of Łódź (she planned to study directing at the Higher Theater School, under the condition of graduating from philology studies). Among its lecturers were Zdzisław Stieber, Tadeusz Kotarbiński and Stefania Skwarczyńska. She completed her M.A. Polish Philology in 1952, after which she started working at the State Publishing Institute. Thanks to the cooperation with Zdzisław Stieber, she joined the Dialectological Laboratory of the Polish Academy of Sciences, which he later became the Institute of Slavic Studies of the Polish Academy of Sciences.

In 1959 she obtained a doctoral degree at the University of Warsaw (the supervisor was Zdzisław Stieber), and in 1964 she obtained her habilitation at the same university. In 1974 she was awarded the title of associate professor and in 1978 full professor.

Topolińska was a visiting professor at the University of Chicago (1967) and UCLA (1988) .

From 1975 she was a professor at the Institute of Polish Language of the Polish Academy of Sciences, from 1983 a member of the Warsaw Scientific Society, from 1991 - PAU, also a member of the Macedonian Academy of Sciences and Arts. She researches in the field of phonology, time, syntax, Polish and Slavic dialectology, including: Polish-Pomeranian relations (1964), Kashubian (1980), Language, man, space (1999), Slavic languages in an ecolinguistic perspective (2003, together with Władysław Lubaś and Ivan Ohnheiser), a Polish-Macedonian and Macedonian-Polish dictionary (together with Božidar Widoeski and Włodzimierz Pianka). At the Institute of Polish Language of the Polish Academy of Sciences, she led the team that led to the publication of the collective Grammar of the Polish language vol. 1-2 (1983). For many years she has been living in Macedonia in Skopje (where she worked at the Macedonian Academy of Sciences and Arts, as well as at the Ss. Cyril and Methodius University of Skopje). She obtained Macedonian citizenship; she is a member of the Macedonian Academy of Sciences (MANU).

== Awards ==
- Honorary Doctorate of the Ss. Cyril and Methodius University of Skopje (1997)
- honorary doctorate of the University of Wrocław (2016)

== Publications ==
Author of more than 500 publications and over 20 books in the fields of Slavic linguistics, Macedonian philology, slavistics, history. Author of the following books:

- A historical phonology of the Kashubian dialects of Polish(1974)
- Remarks on the Slavic noun phrase (1981)
- The Sociolinguistic situation of the Macedonian language (1998)
