= Caribbean (board game) =

Board game

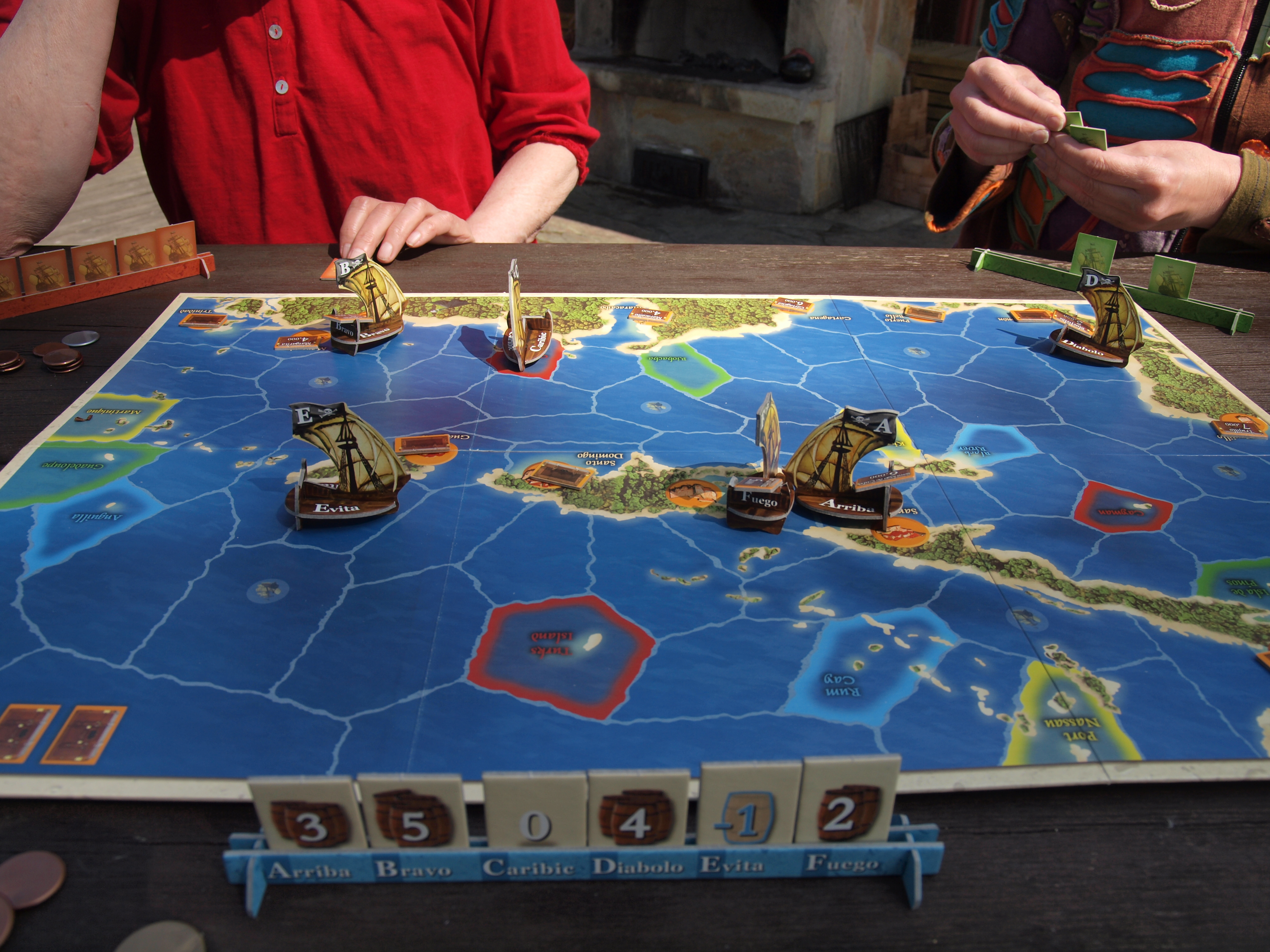
- A game of Caribbean being played in Kirkkonummi, Finland
- Designers: Michail Antonow and Jens-Peter Schliemann
- Publication: 2004
- Players: 2-4

Caribbean is a 2004 board game designed by Michail Antonow and Jens-Peter Schliemann. The game was nominated for the 2005 Vuoden Peli Adult Game of the Year.

== Rules ==
Caribbean is a game for two to four players, taking place in the Caribbean in the 18th century. Six pirate ships, named Arriba, Bravo, Caribic, Diabolo, Evita and Fuego, sail the waters, intent on plundering treasure from ports both on the continent and on several islands. The players are looking to make as much profit as possible from this plundering.

However, the players do not have direct control over the ships - their pirate crews work independently, and so the players have to bribe them with barrels of rum to get to issue them orders. To this end, each player has seven cards, each containing a different number of barrels. Six of these are numbered from 0 to 5, and the seventh is a special "robber" card, numbered -1.

At the start of a round, each player assigns six of their cards, in secret, to the six pirate ships, deciding how much rum they want to bribe each ship's crew with. After this, the players go through the ships one by one, revealing their bribes for the ship in question. The player with the highest bribe gets to move the ship, as many places as there are barrels on their bribe card. In case of a tie, the players may opt to reveal their seventh card as a tie-breaker. This tie-breaker may only be used once per round. If another player has assigned the "robber" card to the ship in question, one barrel of rum is stolen from the player with the highest bribe.

Players gain money by plundering treasure from ports and taking it to their secret hide-outs, indicated on the board by a coloured border around the place, with the colour corresponding to the player's own chosen colour. The first player to reach a pre-set sum of money wins.
