= Šárka B. Hrbková =

American author (1878–1948)

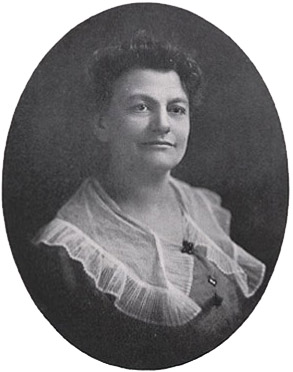
- Šárka B. Hrbková
- Born: August 23, 1878; Cedar Rapids, Iowa, US
- Died: February 7, 1948 (aged 69); Cedar Rapids, Iowa, US
- Burial place: Czech National Cemetery in Cedar Rapids
- Education: University of Iowa, University of Nebraska–Lincoln
- Occupations: Professor, translator, slavologist, historian, journalist, writer, union official, suffragette, feminist
- Employer: University of Nebraska
- Title: Professor

Šárka B. Hrbková (also Sarka B. Hrbek, Sarka B. Herbkova, Sarah Hrbek and Sara B. Hrbek; August 23, 1878 – February 7, 1948) was an American author, writer, university professor, translator, Slavologist, historian, journalist, union official, suffragette, and feminist of Czech descent.

== Early life ==
Hrbková was born on August 23, 1878, in Cedar Rapids, Iowa. At the time there was a significant Czech community in Iowa. Her younger brother was Jefrem D. Hrbek (1882–1907), who was the founder of the School of Slavonic Language and Literature at the University of Nebraska.

== Career ==
After graduating from a school for teachers, from 1895 to 1906 she taught in the public schools in Cedar Rapids. There, she organized the first night school for foreigners and Czech immigrants.

She earned her Bachelor of the Arts from University of Iowa in 1909 in literature, Slavic studies, and Bohemian studies.

In January 1908, she accepted a position as a graduate student and teacher of Czech at the University of Nebraska, replacing her deceased brother Professor Jefrem Hrbek, who died in 1907. As a graduate student at the University of Nebraska, and after her graduation, from 1908 to 1919, she was a member of the faculty and served as the chairman of the Department of Slavonic Languages and Literature. She became an adjunct professor in 1910 and an assistant professor in 1914. In 1918 she was made a full professor. She graduated with a Masters of Arts from the University of Nebraska in 1914. She was the first Czech woman to teach at the University of Nebraska.

Beginning in 1908 and continuing until 1917, she was the editor-in-chief of the Komensky Magazine, which was written in Czech.

== Czechoslovak Resistance ==
During her career, she was active in the Czech community in the United States, which was strengthened by efforts to establish an independent Czechoslovak state after the beginning of World War I. Sarka gave educational lectures on Slavic studies and the history of the Czech-American community throughout the United States, including in Texas, Cleveland, Oklahoma City. After 1914, her speeches and newspaper contributions to Czech-American periodicals were written in Czech. She was involved in supporting the activities of Czechs in exile, including Tomáš Garrigue Masaryk, Edvard Beneš, and Milan Rastislav Štefánik and advocating for the creation of an independent Czechoslovakia.

== After 1918 ==
When World War I broke out, she became active in war work. She was a member of the Nebraska State Council of Defense and the only woman member of said council. between 1918 and 1919, served as the Chairman of the Woman's Committee in said council. She was appointed to this position by Dr. Anna Howard Shaw and was later elected to it by a mass vote of the women of Nebraska. For her service with this organization, she received no pay. In 1919, she was made Chairman of the Speaker's Division of the Women's State Liberty Loan Committee.

In 1919, she left Nebraska for New York City, where she served as manager of the Czechoslovak Bureau of the Foreign Language Information Service of the American Red Cross. She probably directly replaced Josef Tvrzický in the leadership position, whose health deteriorated sharply due to a hereditary disease, leading him to commit suicide in 1920.

In the following years, she continued to be active in the Czech-American community and worked as an interpreter and author in New York.

She was a member of numerous scholarly and cultural organizations, including the Iowa historical society, Nebraska historical society, and the National League of American Penwomen.

She returned to Cedar Rapids in 1942 and lived the last years of her life in the home of her family.

== Death ==
Šárka B. Hrbková died on February 7, 1948, in her native Cedar Rapids at the age of 69. She was buried in the family grave at the Czech National Cemetery in Cedar Rapids.

== Works ==
Her works include:

- The Slavs of Austria-Hungary (1918)
- "Bridging the Atlantic: A Discussion of the Problems and Methods of Americanization" (1919).
- "Bohemians in Nebraska." Nebraska State Historical Society 19 (1919):158.
- Czechoslovak Stories (1920)
- "'Bunk' in Americanization." The Forum (April–May 1920): 428–438
- "Notes on the paintings" in Historical paintings of the Slavic nations by Alfons Mucha (1921)
- "The Czecho-Slovaks in America" Our World (December 1923): 88–90

Her translations include:

- Jan Výrava, play by František Adolf Šubert (1915)
- The Will o' the Wisp, play by Jaroslav Kvapil (1916)
- The Apple Tree by Svatopluk Cech (1922)
- Czechoslovak Stories, anthology of short stories (1920)
