= Welsh studies =

Interdisciplinary field of research

Welsh Dragon

Welsh studies is an interdisciplinary field of research devoted to the study of Wales, History of Wales, Geography of Wales, Politics of Wales, Economy of Wales, Culture of Wales, Welsh language, Welsh-language literature, Welsh literature in English, and of Welsh people in Wales and elsewhere. It is sometimes subsumed within the category of Celtic studies and European studies. An alternative term is Wales Studies which is preferred by the Learned Society of Wales.

== Centres ==
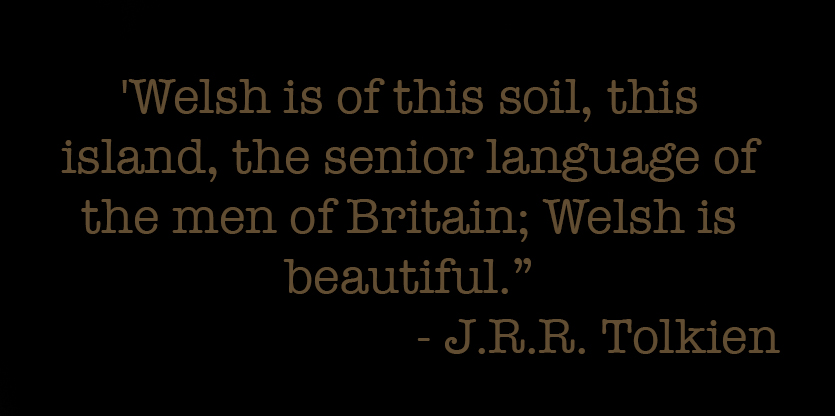
Quote by J. R. R. Tolkien

All of the universities in Wales offer expertise in aspects of Welsh studies. These include:

- Cardiff University: School of Welsh
- Swansea University: Department of Welsh
- Aberystwyth University: Department of Welsh and Celtic Studies
- Bangor University: Department of Welsh and Celtic Studies
- University of Wales Trinity Saint David Centre for Advanced Welsh and Celtic Studies

There is also a centre in the United States:

- University of Rio Grande: Madog Center for Welsh Studies
- Utica College: Harry F. Jackson Welsh Collection is the largest collection of 19th and 20th century Welsh-language literature in the United States

== Organisations ==
- Llafur: The Welsh People's History Society
- National Library of Wales
- Welsh North American Society
