= North American Society for Serbian Studies =

Non-profit scholarly organization

- Abbreviation: NASSS
- Formation: 1978
- Website: serbianstudies.org

The North American Society for Serbian Studies (NASSS) is a non-profit scholarly organization based in North America, founded in 1978, aimed at promoting research and forward Serbian studies and increasing public awareness and understanding of Serbia and its culture and people, including the Serbian diaspora. It is a member of the Association for Slavic, East European, and Eurasian Studies (ASEEES). It publishes the peer-reviewed journal Serbian Studies.

== History ==
Slovenian scholar Rado Lenček (1921–2005), a member of the Serbian Academy of Sciences and Arts (SANU) and the founder of the Society for Slovene Studies, suggested to his Serbian colleagues to establish the NASSS, whose member he became.
