= British studies =

Academic subject

British studies is the academic study of Britain — its culture, geography and history.

Britain is significant as a topic because it was the location of the Industrial Revolution; the British Empire was large and influential in world history; and English is now a major international language. The topic is especially studied in the USA as students there often have a heritage of British ancestry which encourages Anglophilia while the shared language of English makes British culture readily accessible.

In Germany, the topic is a specialism of Kulturkunde and Landeskunde and there is a Journal for the Study of British Cultures.

A course was started at the University of Texas in 1975 and, more recently, courses have started at other universities such as Columbia, Yale and the Faculty of World Studies at University of Tehran.
