= Baltistics =

Multidisciplinary study of the language and culture of the Baltic nations

Baltistics, also referred to as Baltic studies, is a multidisciplinary study of the language and culture (history, literature, folklore and mythology) of the Baltic nations. Baltistics by its subject splits into Lithuanistics, Latvistics, Prussistics, etc. Special attention is paid to language studies, especially to the reconstruction of the Proto-Baltic language, which some linguists have argued is the same as the Proto-Balto-Slavic language, while others (V. Toporov, V. Ivanov, V. Mažiulis etc.) have believed that the Proto-Slavic language has formed out of the Proto-Baltic peripheral-type dialects. Currently there are about 30 centres of Baltistics, most of them based in Europe, the University of Vilnius considered to be the most active centre.

== History ==
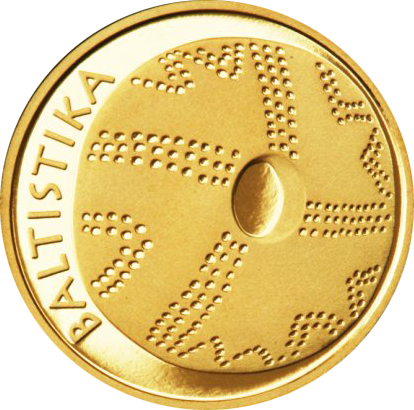
A commemorative Lithuanian litas coin, dedicated to Baltistics, depicts an amber disk from the Neolithic era

First signs of researching and comparing of the Baltic languages – Lithuanian and Latvian – were seen in the writings of the grammar creators (Daniel Klein, Grammatica Litvanica 1653, Gotthard Friedrich Stender, Lettische Grammatik 1783). For the first time, scientifically Baltic languages were researched and compared with other Indo-European languages in the 19th century, when Franz Bopp in 1816 laid the ground for comparative linguistics. In his Vergleichende Grammatik, published in 1833, Lithuanian was included. Prussian language was researched by Georg Heinrich Ferdinand Nesselmann (Die Sprache der alten Preussen an ihren Ueberresten erlaeutert, 1845) and Erich Berneker (Die preussische Sprache, 1896). It was Nesselmann who first suggested the term "Baltic languages".

From 1718 to 1944, a seminar for the study of the Lithuanian language took place in the University of Königsberg.

== Current status ==
Despite the trend in education since the latter part of the 20th century towards economic rationalism and its impacts on humanities departments, baltistics as a course of study is still offered by a surprising number of universities in the Baltic region and further afield. The majority of universities offering such programs are located in central and northern Europe, with courses offered at an undergraduate level at the University of Greifswald, Goethe University Frankfurt in Germany, University of Warsaw in Poland, Masaryk University in the Czech Republic and Stockholm University in Sweden. Some universities also offer individual modules as part of broader programs, for example the Bachelor of Linguistics at the University of Mainz, Germany, which offers language modules in Lithuanian or Latvian, as part of a Bachelor in Scandinavian Studies at the University of Vienna, Austria, or courses for specialists in comparative historical linguistics by the philological department at Moscow State University. In North America, there is an undergraduate Baltic studies program offered by Washington University in St. Louis.

== See also ==
- Slavic studies
- Indo-European studies
- Category:Balticists
- Category:Balts
