= Slavic studies =

Studies of Slavic peoples, languages, and culture

Slavic (American English) or Slavonic (British English) studies, also known as Slavistics, is the academic field of area studies concerned with Slavic peoples, languages, history, and culture. Originally, a Slavist or Slavicist was primarily a linguist or philologist researching Slavistics. Increasingly, historians, social scientists, and other humanists who study Slavic cultures and societies have been included in this rubric.

In the United States, Slavic studies is dominated by Russian studies. Ewa Thompson, a professor of Slavic studies at Rice University, described the situation of non-Russian Slavic studies as "invisible and mute".

== History ==
Slavistics emerged in the late 18th and early 19th centuries, simultaneously with Romantic nationalism among various Slavic nations, and ideological attempts to establish a common sense of Slavic community, exemplified by the Pan-Slavist movement. Among the first scholars to use the term was Josef Dobrovský (1753–1829).

The history of Slavic studies can be divided into three periods. Until 1876 the early Slavists concentrated on documentation and printing of monuments of Slavic languages, among them the first texts written in national languages. At this time the majority of Slavic languages received their first modern dictionaries, grammars, and compendia. The second period, ending with World War I, featured the rapid development of Slavic philology and linguistics, most notably outside of Slavic countries themselves, in the circles formed around August Schleicher (1821–1868) and around August Leskien (1840–1916) at the University of Leipzig. At this time, Slavonic scholars focused on dialectology.

After World War II, centers of Slavic studies were created at various universities around the world, with much greater expansion into other humanities and social science disciplines. This development was partly due to political concerns in Western Europe and the North America arising from the Cold War. Slavic studies flourished in the years from World War II into the 1990s, though university enrollments in Slavic languages have declined since then.

== Subfields ==
Following the traditional division of Slavs into three subgroups (eastern, southern, western), Slavic studies are divided into three distinct subfields:

- East Slavic studies, encompassing the study of East Slavic peoples and their linguistic, literary, and other cultural and historical heritages.
  - Belarusian studies, or Belarusistics (Latin: Belarusistica);
  - Russian studies, or Russistics (Latin: Russistica);
  - Rusyn studies, or Rusynistics (Latin: Rusinistica);
  - Ukrainian studies, or Ukrainistics (Latin: Ucrainistica);
- South Slavic studies, encompassing the study of South Slavic peoples and their linguistic, literary, and other cultural and historical heritages.
  - Bosnian studies, or Bosnistics (Latin: Bosnistica);
  - Bulgarian studies, or Bulgaristics (Latin: Bulgaristica);
  - Croatian studies, or Croatistics (Latin: Croatistica);
  - Macedonian studies, or Macedonistics (Latin: Macedonistica);
  - Montenegrin studies, or Montenegristics (Latin: Montenegristica);
  - Serbian studies, or Serbistics (Latin: Serbistica);
  - Slovenian studies, or Slovenistics (Latin: Slovenistica);
  - Yugoslav studies, or Yugoslavistics (Latin: Iugoslavistica);
- West Slavic studies, encompassing the study of West Slavic peoples and their linguistic, literary, and other cultural and historical heritages.
  - Czech studies, or Bohemistics (Latin: Bohemistica);
  - Kashubian studies, or Kashubistics (Latin: Kashubistica);
  - Polish studies, or Polonistics (Latin: Polonistica);
  - Slovak studies, or Slovakistics (Latin: Slovacistica);
  - Sorbian studies, or Sorbistics (Latin: Sorbistica).

== Slavic countries and areas of interest ==
- By country:
  - Belarus: language, literature, culture, history
  - Bosnia and Herzegovina: language, literature, culture, history
  - Bulgaria: language, literature, culture, history
  - Croatia: language, literature, culture, history
  - Czech Republic: language, literature, culture, history
  - North Macedonia: language, literature, culture, history
  - Montenegro: language, literature, culture, history
  - Poland: languages/dialects (Polish, Kashubian, Silesian), literature (Polish, Kashubian), culture, history
  - Russia: language, literature, culture, history
  - Serbia: language, literature, culture, history (national and ethnic)
  - Slovakia: language, literature, culture, history
  - Slovenia: language, literature, culture, history
  - Ukraine: language, literature, culture, history
  - Other languages: Serbo-Croatian, Upper Sorbian, Lower Sorbian, Kashubian, Polabian, Rusyn, Old Church Slavonic

== Notable people ==
Historical

- Johann Christoph Jordan, the author of an early scholarly work in Slavic studies
- Josef Dobrovský (1753–1829) from Bohemia
- Jernej Kopitar (1780–1844) from Slovenia
- Alexander Vostokov (1781–1864) from Russia
- Vuk Stefanović Karadžić (1787–1864) from Serbia
- Pavel Jozef Šafařík (1795–1861) from Slovakia
- Mykhaylo Maksymovych (1804–1873) from Ukraine
- Izmail Sreznevsky (1812–1880) from Russia
- Franz Miklosich (1813–1891) from Slovenia
- Fyodor Buslaev (1818–1898) from Russia
- August Schleicher (1821–1868) from Germany
- Đuro Daničić (1825–1882) from Serbia
- Anton Janežič (1828–1869) from Slovenia
- Alexander Potebnja (1835–1891) from Ukraine
- Vatroslav Jagić (1838–1923) from Croatia
- August Leskien (1840–1916) from Germany
- Jan Niecisław Baudouin de Courtenay (1845–1929) from Poland
- Filipp Fortunatov (1848–1914) from Russia
- Ivan Milčetić (1853–1921) from Croatia
- Aleksander Brückner (1856–1939) from eastern Galicia
- Matija Murko (1861–1952) from Slovenia
- Lyubomir Miletich (1863–1937) from Bulgaria/Macedonia
- Aleksey Shakhmatov (1864–1920) from Russia
- Antoine Meillet (1866–1936) from France
- Holger Pedersen (1867–1953) from Denmark
- Mikhail Pokrovsky 1869–1942) from Russia
- Josip Tominšek (1872–1954) from Slovenia
- Krste Misirkov (1874–1926) from Macedonia/Bulgaria/Russia
- Aleksandar Belić (1876–1960) from Serbia
- André Mazon (1881–1967) from France
- Max Vasmer (1886–1962) from Russia
- André Vaillant (1890–1977) from France
- Dmytro Chyzhevsky (1894–1977) from Ukraine
- Roman Jakobson (1896–1982) from Russia
- Josef Matl (1897–1974) from Austria
- Zdzisław Stieber (1903–1980) from Poland
- Dmitry Likhachev (1906–1999) from Russia
- George Shevelov (1908–2002) from Ukraine
- Jaroslav Rudnyckyj (1910–1995) from eastern Galicia
- Stoyko Stoykov (1912–1969) from Bulgaria
- Horace G. Lunt (1918–2010) from the United States
- Karel van het Reve (1921–1999) from the Netherlands
- Blaže Koneski (1921–1993) from North Macedonia
- Juri Lotman (1922–1993) from Soviet Union/Estonia
- Henrik Birnbaum (1925–2002) from Poland/United States
- Vladislav Illich-Svitych (1934–1966) from Russia
- Thomas Schaub Noonan (1938–2001) from the United States
- Wolfgang Kasack (1927–2003) from Germany
- Isabel de Madariaga (1919–2014) from UK
- John Simon Gabriel Simmons (1915–2005) from UK
- Vladimir Dybo (1930–2023) from Russia
- Pavle Ivić (1924–1999) from Serbia
- Edward Stankiewicz (1920–2013) from Poland/United States
- Nicholas V. Riasanovsky (1923–2011) Russian-American
- Alexander M. Schenker (1924–2019) from the United States
- Zoe Hauptová (1929–2012) from the Czech Republic
- Andrey Zaliznyak (1935–2017) from Russia
- Kenneth Naylor (1937–1992) from the United States
- Zbigniew Gołąb (1923–1994) from Poland
- Leszek Moszyński (1928–2006) from Poland
- Adam Suprun (1928-1999) from Belarus
- Boris Uspensky (1937–2005) from Russia
- Tadeusz Lehr-Spławiński (1891–1965) from Poland
- Blaže Ristovski (1931–2018) from North Macedonia
- Radoslav Katičić (1930–2019) from Croatia
- Ivan Dorovský (1935–2021) from Czech Republic
- Wiesław Boryś (1939–2021) from Poland
- Šárka B. Hrbková (1878–1948) Czech-American slavologist
- Charles E. Townsend (1932–2015) from the United States
- Charles E. Gribble (1936–2016) from the United States

Contemporary

- Irwin Weil (born 1928) from the United States
- Zuzanna Topolińska (born 1931) from Poland
- Hakan Kırımlı (born 1958) from Turkey
- Stefan Brezinski (born 1932) from Bulgaria
- Gerhard Simon (born 1937) from Germany
- Branko Mikasinovich (born 1938) from the United States
- Mario Capaldo (born 1945) from Italy
- Frederik Kortlandt (born 1946) from Netherlands
- Gary Saul Morson (born 1948) from the United States
- Victor Friedman (born 1949) from the United States
- Christina Kramer (born c. 1950) from the United States
- Ivo Pospíšil (born 1952) from the Czech Republic
- Alexander F. Tsvirkun (born 1953) from Ukraine
- Snježana Kordić (born 1964) from Croatia
- Charles S. Kraszewski (born 1962) from the United States
- Marek Jan Chodakiewicz (born 1962) from Poland and the United States
- Alexandra Popoff (born 1959) from Russia
- Catriona Kelly (born 1959) from UK
- Aage A. Hansen-Löve (born 1947) from Austria

== Journals and book series ==
- Archiv für slavische Philologie
- Canadian Slavonic Papers, published by the Canadian Association of Slavists
- The Russian Review
- Sarmatian Review
- Slavic and East European Journal, published by the American Association of Teachers of Slavic and East European Languages
- Slavic Review, published by the American Association for the Advancement of Slavic Studies
- Studies in Slavic and General Linguistics
- The Slavonic and East European Review
- Scando-Slavica
- Wiener Slawistischer Almanach

== Conferences ==
- American Association for the Advancement of Slavic Studies
- American Association of Teachers of Slavic and East European Languages
- Formal Approaches to Slavic Linguistics

== Institutes and schools ==
Academic

- Institute for Slavic Studies of the Russian Academy of Sciences, Moscow, Russia
- Jan Stanislav Institute of Slavistics, Slovak Academy of Sciences, Bratislava, Slovakia
- Institute of Slavic Studies, Polish Academy of Sciences, Warsaw, Poland
- Institute of Slavonic Studies, Czech Academy of Sciences, Prague, Czechia

University

- Institute of Western and Southern Slavic Studies, University of Warsaw, Poland
- Institute of Slavonic Philology, Uniwersytet Śląski, Poland
- Institute of Slavonic Studies, Jagiellonian University, Poland
- Institute of Slavic Philology, University of Adam Mickiewicz, Poland
- Institute of Slavic Studies, University of Wroclaw, Poland
- Institute of Slavic Philology, Adam Mickiewicz University in Poznań, Poland
- Institute of Slavic Studies, Lviv University, Ukraine
- Department of Slavonic Philology, University of Tartu, Estonia
- Department of Slavic philology, University of Belgrade, Serbia
- Department of Slavistics, University of Novi Sad, Serbia
- Department of Russian and Slavonic Studies, Trinity College Dublin, Ireland
- UCL School of Slavonic and East European Studies, University College London, United Kingdom
- Department of Russian and Slavonic Studies, University of Nottingham, United Kingdom
- Department of Slavic Languages & Literatures, Chengchi University, Taiwan
- Department of Slavic Languages and Literatures, Yale University, United States
- Institute of Slavic, East European, and Eurasian Studies, University of California at Berkeley, United States
- Department of Slavic Languages & Literatures, Harvard University, United States
- Department of Slavic Languages and Literatures, Stanford University, United States
- Slavic Department, Barnard College, United States
- Department of Slavic Languages and Literatures, University of Princeton, United States
- Department of Slavic Studies, Brown University, United States
- Department of Slavic Languages, Columbia University, United States
- Department of German, Nordic, and Slavic+, University of Wisconsin–Madison, United States
- Department of Slavic Languages and Literatures, Weinberg College of Arts and Sciences, United States
- Department of Slavic Languages & Literatures, University of Washington, United States
- Department of Slavic Languages & Literatures, University of Virginia, United States
- Department of Slavic Languages & Literatures, University of Pittsburgh, United States
- Department of Russian and Slavic Studies, University of Arizona, United States
- Department of Slavic and Eurasian Studies, University of Texas at Austin, United States
- Department of Slavic Languages and Literatures, University of Illinois Urbana-Champaign, United States
- Department of Slavic and Eurasian Studies, Duke University, United States
- Department of Slavic Languages, Georgetown University, United States
- Department of Slavic Languages and Literatures, University of Southern California, United States
- Department of Slavic Languages & Literatures, University of Toronto, Canada
- Department of Germanic and Slavic Studies, University of Victoria, Canada
- Department of Germanic and Slavic Studies, University of Waterloo, Canada
- Department of Slavic Studies(Le département d’études slaves), Universite Paris 8, France
- Institute for Slavistics, University of Vienna, Austria
- Institute for Slavistics, University of Graz, Austria
- Department of Slavic Studies, University of Salzburg, Austria
- Department of Slavonic and Finno-Ugrian Studies, University of Delhi, India
- Department of Slavic Studies, Comenius University, Slovakia
- Department of Russian Language and Literature & Slavic Studies, University of Athens, Greece
- Department of Slavistics, University of Ljubljana, Slovenia
- Department of Slavic Languages and Literatures, University of Maribor, Slovenia
- Department of Slavonic Studies, University of Olomouc, Czechia
- Department of Slavonic Studies, Masaryk University, Czechia
- Department of Slavonic Studies, University of Ostrava, Czechia
- Department of Slavic Studies, Plovdiv University "Paisii Hilendarski", Bulgaria
- Department of Slavic Studies, Sofia University, Bulgaria
- Institute of Slavic Studies, Heidelberg University, Germany
- Institute of Slavic Studies, University of Giessen, Germany
- Institute of Slavic Studies, Kiel University, Germany
- Institute of Slavic Studies, University of Mainz, Germany
- Institute of Slavic Studies, University of Regensburg, Germany
- Institute of Slavic Studies, Westfälische Wilhelms-Universität Münster, Germany
- Institute of Slavic Studies, University of Hamburg, Germany
- Institute of Slavic Studies, Greifswald University, Germany
- Institute of Slavic Studies, Otto-Friedrich-Universität Bamberg, Germany
- Institute of Slavistics, Technische Universität Dresden, Germany
- Institute of Slavistics, University of Potsdam, Germany
- Institute for Slavic Studies, Humboldt University of Berlin, Germany
- Institute of Slavic Languages and Literatures, LMU Munich, Germany
- Institute of Slavic Studies, University of Oldenburg, Germany
- Department of Slavic Languages and Literatures, Ankara, Turkey
- Institute of Slavic Studies, Tbilisi State University, Georgia
- Department of Russian and Slavic Philology(Departamentul de Filologie Rusă şi Slavă), Romania
- Department of Russian and Slavic Studies, Hebrew University of Jerusalem
- Institute of Slavic Studies, University of Pécs, Hungary
- Institute of Slavonic and Baltic Philology, Eötvös Loránd University, Hungary
- Institute of Slavic Philology, University of Szeged, Hungary
- Resource Center for Medieval Slavic Studies, Ohio State University, United States
- Slavic Department, University of Chicago, United States
- Núcleo de Estudos em Eslavística, Federal University of Rio de Janeiro, Brazil
- Núcleo de Estudos Eslavos, Universidade Estadual do Centro-Oeste, Brazil

Others

- Old Church Slavonic Institute, Zagreb, Croatia
- Ghent Centre for Slavic and East European Studies, Ghent, Belgium

== Organisations ==
- American Association of Teachers of Slavic and East European Languages (AATSEEL)
- Association for Slavic, East European, and Eurasian Studies (ASEEES)
- American Council of Teachers of Russian (ACTR)
- North American Association of Teachers of Polish (NAATPl)

== See also ==
- Balkan studies
- Baltistics
- Byzantine studies
- Church Slavonic
- Slavic languages

== Sources ==
- Greenberg, Robert D. (2004). Language and Identity in the Balkans: Serbo-Croatian and its Disintegration. New York: Oxford University Press. ISBN 978-0-19-151455-5.
