= Slovenian studies =

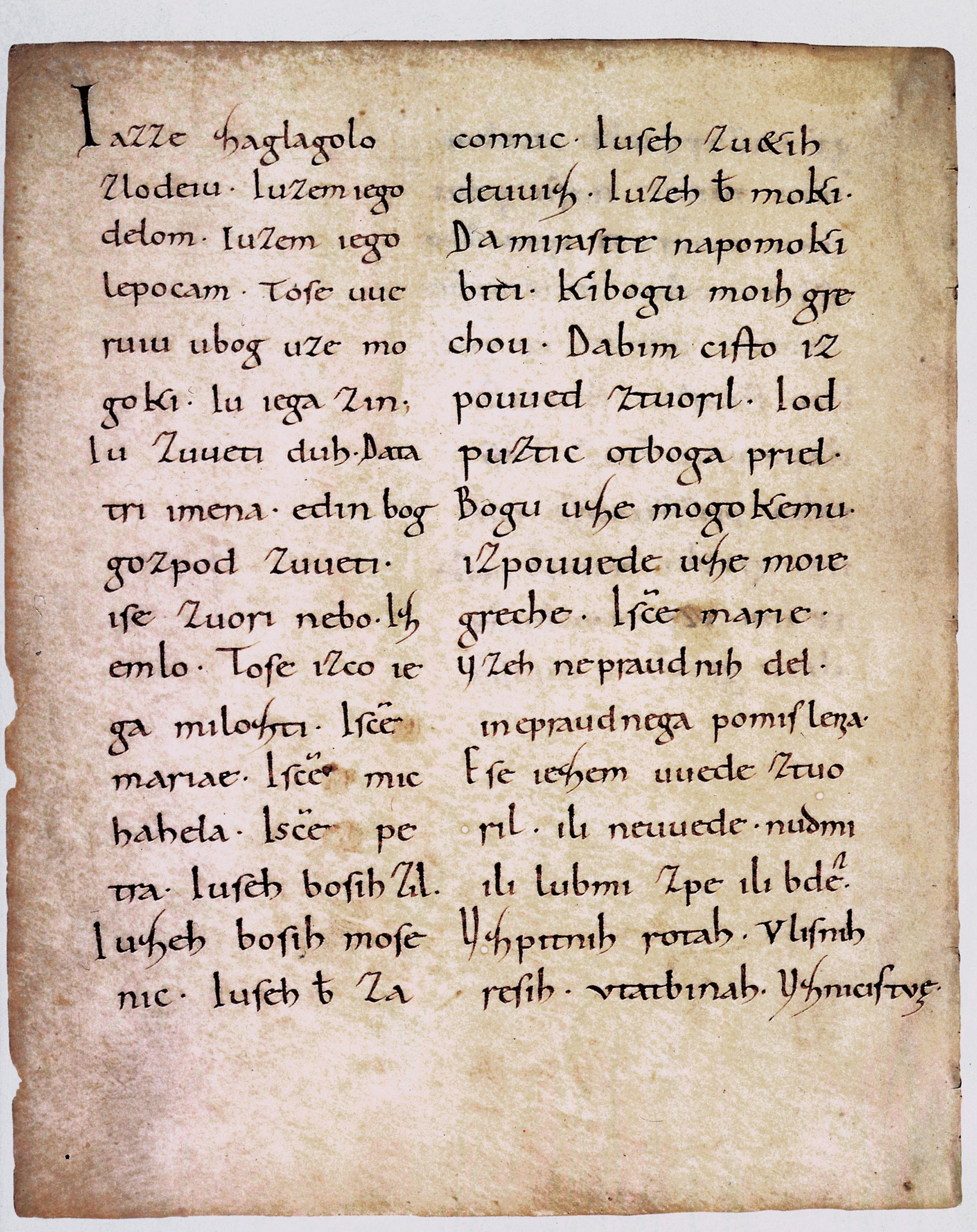
Freising manuscripts

Slovenian studies or Slovenistics (Slovene: Slovenistika, German: Slowenistik, Serbo-Croatian: Slovenistika, Словенистика) is an academic discipline within Slavic studies which is focused on the study of the Slovene language, literature, history and culture. Within Slavic studies, it belongs to the South Slavic subgroup. The major academic journal in the field is Slovene Studies established in 1973.

== History ==
=== Early history ===
Initial scholarly interest in aspects of the Slovene studies is related to early medieval literary work in dialects of Slovene language in 10th and 11th centuries. The Protestant Reformation in the Slovene lands produced a significant amount of literature in the Slovene language shaping the standardization of the language. At that time, Jurij Dalmatin translated the Bible into the Slovene language in 1584.

=== Development of academic Slovenian studies ===
In 1817 Franc Serafin Metelko was named professor at the newly established department of Slovene language at the Lyceum of Ljubljana. Fran Celestin, founder of Slovenian studies in the Kingdom of Croatia-Slavonia, held his introductory lecture at the Faculty of Humanities and Social Sciences, University of Zagreb in 1878 on the topic of France Prešeren. University level Slovenian studies developed at the University of Zagreb before there was an opportunity for them to develop in Slovenia itself, but local studies in Zagreb were interrupted when Celestin died in 1895.

In 1906 the first university course in Slovene literature in the Kingdom of Serbia took place at the University of Belgrade Faculty of Philology. The area was reintroduced to Zagreb by Fran Ilešič between 1911 and 1914 who defended habilitation on Slovenian language and literature and five years later was appointed a full professor at the University of Zagreb, where he remained until 1941.

With the dissolution of Austria-Hungary and the creation of the Kingdom of Serbs, Croats, and Slovenes, numerous new scientific and cultural institutions in Ljubljana were established, alongside existing ones such as the Slovene Society. The University of Ljubljana was established in 1919 and the Slovenian Academy of Sciences and Arts in 1938. They became important centres for the development of Slovenian studies.

The first annual Seminar for Slovenian Language, Literature and Culture was organised in June of 1965 by the department of Slovenian language of the Faculty of Philosophy of the University of Ljubljana. The two weeks event gathered 30 participants and was the first time Slovene linguists represented their work to international public independently of the Yugoslav Linguistic Seminar which itself was organised for the first time on Lake Bled in Slovenia in 1950.

In 1971 University of Klagenfurt employed Aleksander Isačenko and starting from the winter semester 1973/74 Slovenian and Russian studies were introduced, soon joined by Serbo-Croatian studies.

== See also ==
- Slavic studies
- Yugoslav studies
