= Yugoslav studies =

Academic discipline concerned with the study of Yugoslavia

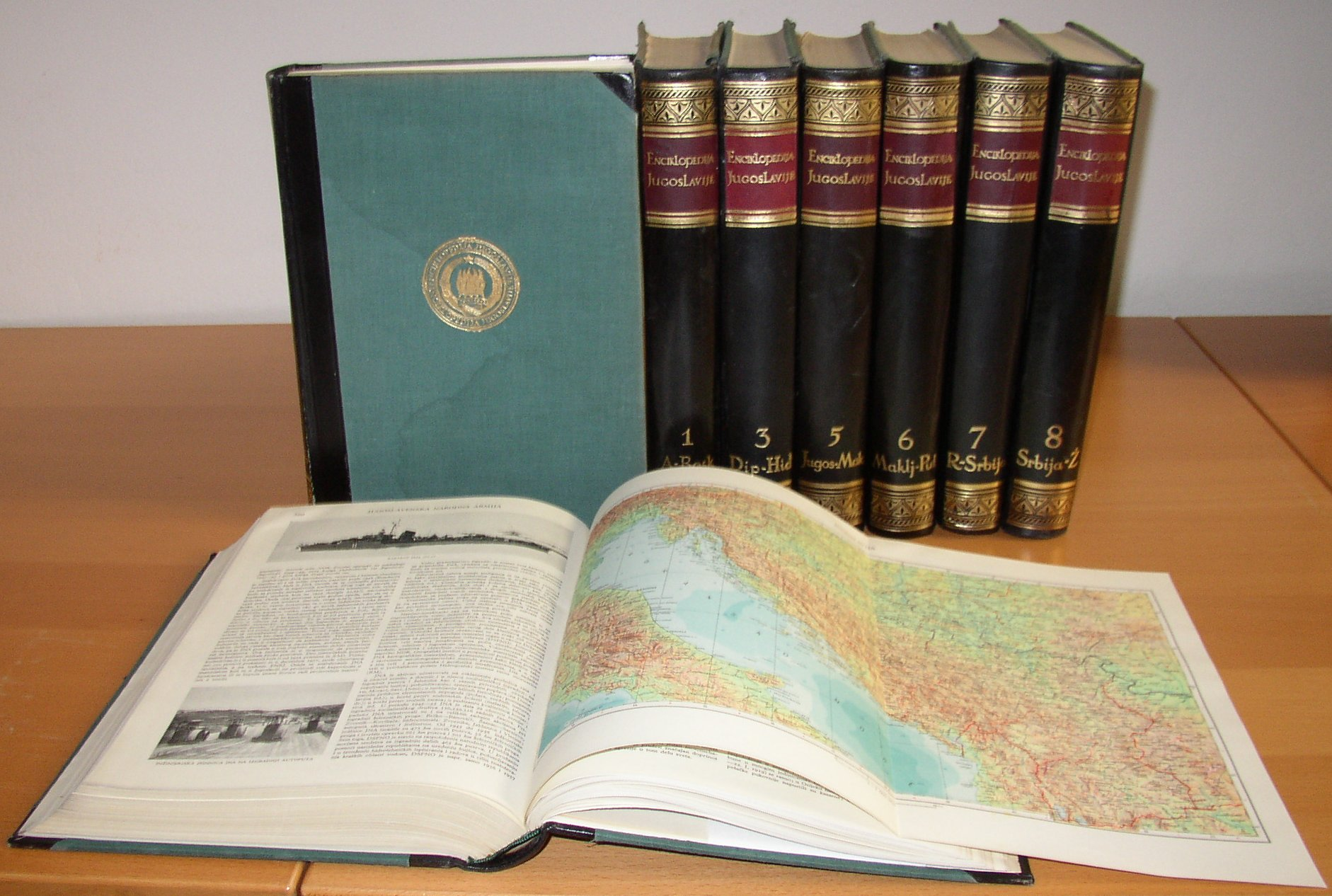
Encyclopedia of Yugoslavia (first edition)

Yugoslav studies or Yugoslavistics (Note: Serbo-Croatian: Jugoslavistika, Југославистика; Slovene: jugoslavologija; Macedonian: Југословенски студии; Albanian: Studime Jugosllave; German: Jugoslawistik; Russian: Югославистика; Latin: Iugoslavistica) is an interdisciplinary academic discipline within social sciences, history, literature and memory studies which is concerned with the study of the 19th-century or earlier origins of the Yugoslav idea, the creation of Yugoslavia, history of the Kingdom of Yugoslavia, World War II in Yugoslavia, SFR Yugoslavia and breakup of Yugoslavia including the Yugoslav Wars, as well as the Yugoslavs either as an umbrella term or exclusive identification. In the contemporary period the discipline is also focused on the post-Yugoslav remembrance of Yugoslavia and is sometimes called post-Yugoslav studies.

Historically, the term has served as an umbrella for Serbo-Croatian (Serbian, Croatian, Bosnian and Montenegrin studies), Macedonian and Slovenian studies within broader Slavic studies. However, this broader application within Slavic studies was frequently contested both within Yugoslavia and internationally, as it was considered imprecise and lacking linguistic justification compared to South Slavic studies.

During the 1990s the discipline was closely intertwined with the field of security studies due to the conflicts in the region.

== History ==
Interwar period research in the field of Yugoslav studies in United Kingdom was shaped by the work of Robert Seton-Watson, Harold Temperley and Carlile Aylmer Macartney as well as prominent academic institutions such as the UCL School of Slavonic and East European Studies in particular. British intelligence agencies involvement in the region during the World War II in Yugoslavia was consequential for the further development of academic research in English language after the end of the World War II. Development of the discipline in France was significantly slower at the time which was in part influenced by Charles de Gaulle personal unwillingness to provide official state support to French academia to engage with the new socialist regime in Yugoslavia.

After her exile from South Africa AnnMarie Wolpe gained a post at the Department of Yugoslav Studies of the University of Bradford in 1963.

Croatian linguist Ljudevit Jonke critiqued the discipline in 1965, arguing it lacked full scientific and historical justification when compared to broader South Slavic studies. He recommended that it should mainly serve as an additional, non-scientific technical term within Yugoslavia to help expand Serbo-Croatian research and address the gap in Macedonian and Slovenian studies. In 1979 Dalibor Brozović expressed similar reservations as far as the field of linguistics in general is concerned but stressed that the discipline is justified even there as far as it investigates how life in the common Yugoslav state influences philology.

=== Discipline in crisis during the Yugoslav Wars ===
The collapse of the Yugoslav state in early 1990s brought the existence of the discipline into question with multiple institutions changing their names or closing down. The field needed to redefine its new position in relation to closely related South Slavic studies (which alongside post-Yugoslav space include Bulgaria as well) and Serbo-Croatian studies (further differentiated into Serbian, Croatian, Bosnian and Montenegrin studies). In his 1993 essay The Phantom of Yugoslavistics (German: Das Phantom der Jugoslavistik) German Slavist Reinhard Lauer stated that the field was based on the historical coincidence of the existence of a Yugoslav state and on the “fading out of the Bulgarian components and interests" concluding that the South Slavic studies should take its place.

The conflict in the area of former Yugoslavia nevertheless attracted significant academic attention with over 130 books being published on it and with multiple authors analyzing it in the framework of Yugoslav or Post-Yugoslav studies.

=== 21st century ===
Today the field is dealing with transdisciplinary analysis of various Yugoslav and post-Yugoslav phenomena, social relations and practices. At the 2022 Association for Slavic, East European, and Eurasian Studies (ASEEES) Annual Convention some 40 scholars interested in the study of socialist Yugoslavia joined together and agreed to establish an organisation dedicated to Yugoslav Studies. The New Yugoslav Studies Association was inaugurated at the ASEEES annual convention following year and by December 2025 from original 41 it brought together 614 members.

== Prominent academics in the field ==
- Stevan K. Pavlowitch
- Sabrina P. Ramet
- Tanja Lucić
- Fred Singleton
- František Krček

== Historical and contemporary institutions ==
=== Contemporary ===
==== Former Yugoslavia ====
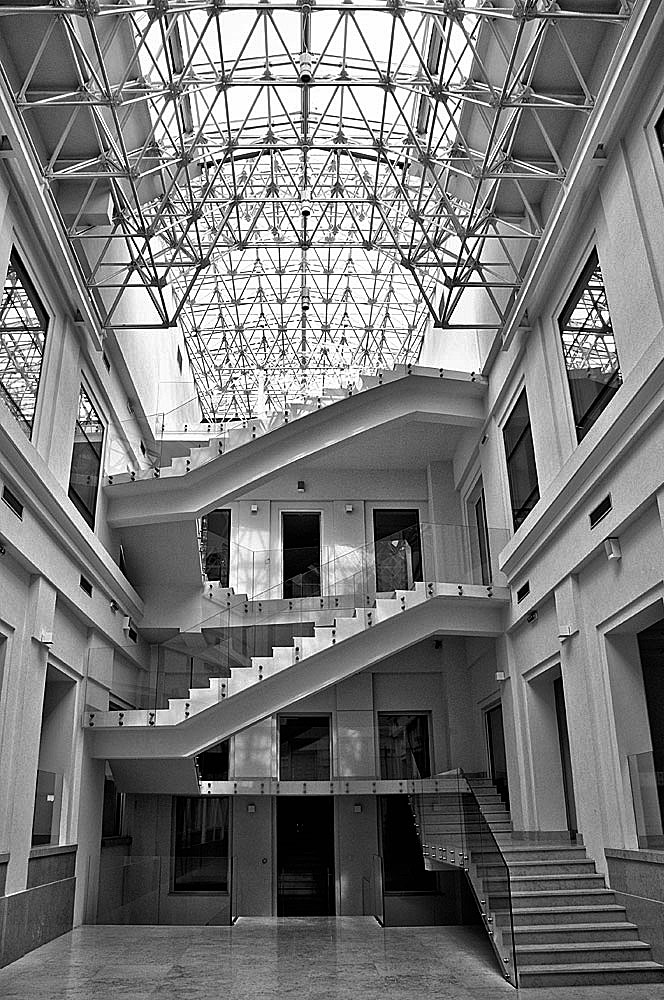
Yugoslav Film Archive, Belgrade, 2013.

- Museum of Yugoslavia
- Archives of Yugoslavia
- Yugoslav Film Archive
- Centre for Yugoslav Studies (CEJUS) at the Singidunum University
- Center for the Study of Post-Socialist Societies of the University of Maribor (established as the Center for the Study of Post-Yugoslav Societies)

==== Elsewhere ====
- Fred Singleton Archive, University of Bradford
- International Association of South-East European Studies
- New Yugoslav Studies Association, Association for Slavic, East European, and Eurasian Studies affiliated interdisciplinary organization

=== Historical ===
==== Former Yugoslavia ====
- Yugoslav Academy of Sciences and Arts (today Croatian Academy of Sciences and Arts)
- Yugoslav Lexicographical Institute (today Miroslav Krleža Institute of Lexicography)
- Department of Yugoslavistics (University of Skopje)
- Department of Yugoslavistics (Faculty of Humanities and Social Sciences, University of Zagreb)
- Department of Yugoslavistics (University of Osijek)

==== Elsewhere ====
- University of Bradford Postgraduate School of Yugoslav Studies
- Department of Yugoslavistics (Charles University)
- Department of Yugoslavistics (Jagiellonian University)
- Department of Yugoslavistics (University of Bucharest)

== See also ==
- Balkan studies
- Encyclopedia of Yugoslavia
- Ottoman studies
- Soviet and Communist studies
- Titoism
- Yugo-nostalgia
- Language secessionism in Serbo-Croatian
