= Czech studies =

Field of humanities

Bohemistics, also known as Czech studies, is the field of humanities that researches, documents and disseminates Czech language and literature in both its historic and present-day forms. The common Czech name for the field is bohemistika. A researcher in the field is usually called a "Bohemist".

== Noted scholars ==
- Josef Dobrovský
- Jan Gebauer
- Bohuslav Havránek
- Josef Jungmann
- Ernest Denis

== See also ==
- Bohemism
- List of English words of Czech origin
- Czech literature
- Czech Republic
- History of the Czech language
- Slovak studies
