= Croatian studies =

Croatian studies or Croatistics (Croatian: Kroatistika, German: Kroatistik, Latin: Croatistica, Polish: Kroatystyka) is an academic discipline within Slavic studies which is concerned with the study of Croatian language, literature, history and culture. Within Slavic studies it belongs to the South Slavic subgroup. Beside Croatia, Croatian studies is taught at universities in Hungary, Ukraine, Slovakia, Czech Republic, Poland, Bulgaria, Romania, India, Canada, Australia and China.

The University of Zagreb has a Center for Croatian Studies.

== History ==
Croatian philological studies have been organized in various frameworks and extents since the founding of the University of Zagreb and its Faculty of Humanities and Social Sciences. The establishment of the Croatian studies unit at the University of Zagreb was closely intertwined with the studies of Slavic philology which were ongoing since the establishment of the Faculty of Humanities and Social Sciences in 1874. Former assistant professor at the Charles University in Prague Leopold (Lavoslav) Geitler became the first full time professor of Slavic studies in Zagreb and two out of his twenty-one courses (namely the "Forms of the Croatian Language from the Perspective of Comparison" and "Old Bulgarian and Croatian Vocabulary") introduced Croatian studies as the university level discipline for the first time ever. At the beginning of 1875/76 academic year the Department of Croatian or Serbian Language and Literature became independent from the Slavic Department. At the turn of the century, special national philological studies were developed within the Slavic studies, primarily Russian studies followed by Polish, Bohemian and other branches of Slavic studies. At the same time, Croatian studies continued to develop within the framework of Yugoslav or Serbo-Croatian studies.

== University level ==
- University of Zagreb: Faculty of Croatian studies
- Juraj Dobrila University of Pula: Department of Croatian studies
- University of Zadar: Department of Croatian studies and Slavic studies
- Macquarie University, Sydney: Discipline of Croatian studies

== See also ==
- Yugoslav studies
