= Katja Sturm-Schnabl =

Austrian linguist and historian (born 1936)

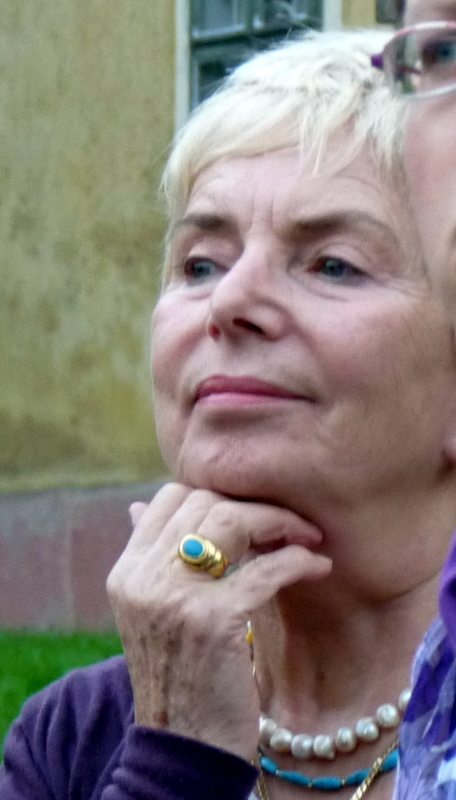
- Born: Katharina Stanislawa; 17 February 1936 (age 90); Zinsdorf, Austria
- Occupations: Literary scholar, cultural historian, linguist and slavicist
- Known for: Carinthian-Slovene contemporary studies

Katja (Stanislawa Katharina) Sturm-Schnabl (born 17 February 1936) is a Carinthian-Slovene linguist and literary historian known for her research and contemporary eyewitness accounts of the 20th century in central Europe.

== Life and work ==
Katja Sturm-Schnabl was born into a politically active Slovenian family on a farm in Zinsdorf, municipality of Magdalensberg in Carinthia, Austria, northeast of Klagenfurt. Her first decisive life experience was the family's deportation in April 1942. Sturm-Schnabl described it this way, "They stormed into the house, shouted incomprehensible things in abrupt sentences (when I was a child I didn't understand German) and there was immediately indescribable chaos in the house... Nemci (Germans) to the left and right and us in the middle, that is how we were taken away, we had to walk through the village." Three and a half years of imprisonment in two camps followed, during which time her ailing older sister Veronika died after receiving an injection by a camp doctor.

After her release from the Eichstätt camp in central Franconia, Sturm-Schnabl attended elementary school and high school in Klagenfurt, and she studied Slavic studies, South Slavic literatures, Russian, art history, and Byzantine studies. In 1973 she received her doctorate with a study on the Slovenian dialect in the Klagenfurt Basin. From 1973 to 1984 she was a research associate at the Commission for Byzantine Studies at the Austrian Academy of Sciences. Her focus was the creation of the prosopographical encyclopedia of the Palaiologian period together with her son Bojan-Ilija Schnabl.

From 1984 to 2016, she taught South Slavic literary and cultural history at the Institute for Slavic Studies at the University of Vienna and was a member of numerous committees and the Equal Opportunities Commission. During this time, she was particularly concerned with supporting students, for whom she organized numerous university and non-university colloquia and presentation opportunities. In particular, their efforts were aimed at establishing a scientifically and historically appropriate institutional setting for Slovene studies (creation of a chair for Slovene studies, with corresponding positions for assistants), which has not yet been established.

In 1993, Sturm-Schnabl habilitated with her dissertation on the correspondence between Franz Miklosich and the southern Slavs (Korespondenca Frana Miklošiča z Južnimi Slovani), for which she received the Leopold Kunschak Prize. Her main research areas are Slovenian literary and cultural history, South Slavic interrelationships, European transcultural studies, with a particular focus on the relationships with the French cultural area, and specific Carinthian Slovene aspects of language development. As a participant in many international conferences, she has widely published in numerous languages (including Slovenian, French, Russian, Serbo-Croatian, German, and Japanese), and she promotes intercultural dialogue through the translation of selected key works from literature and research.

== Honors and awards ==
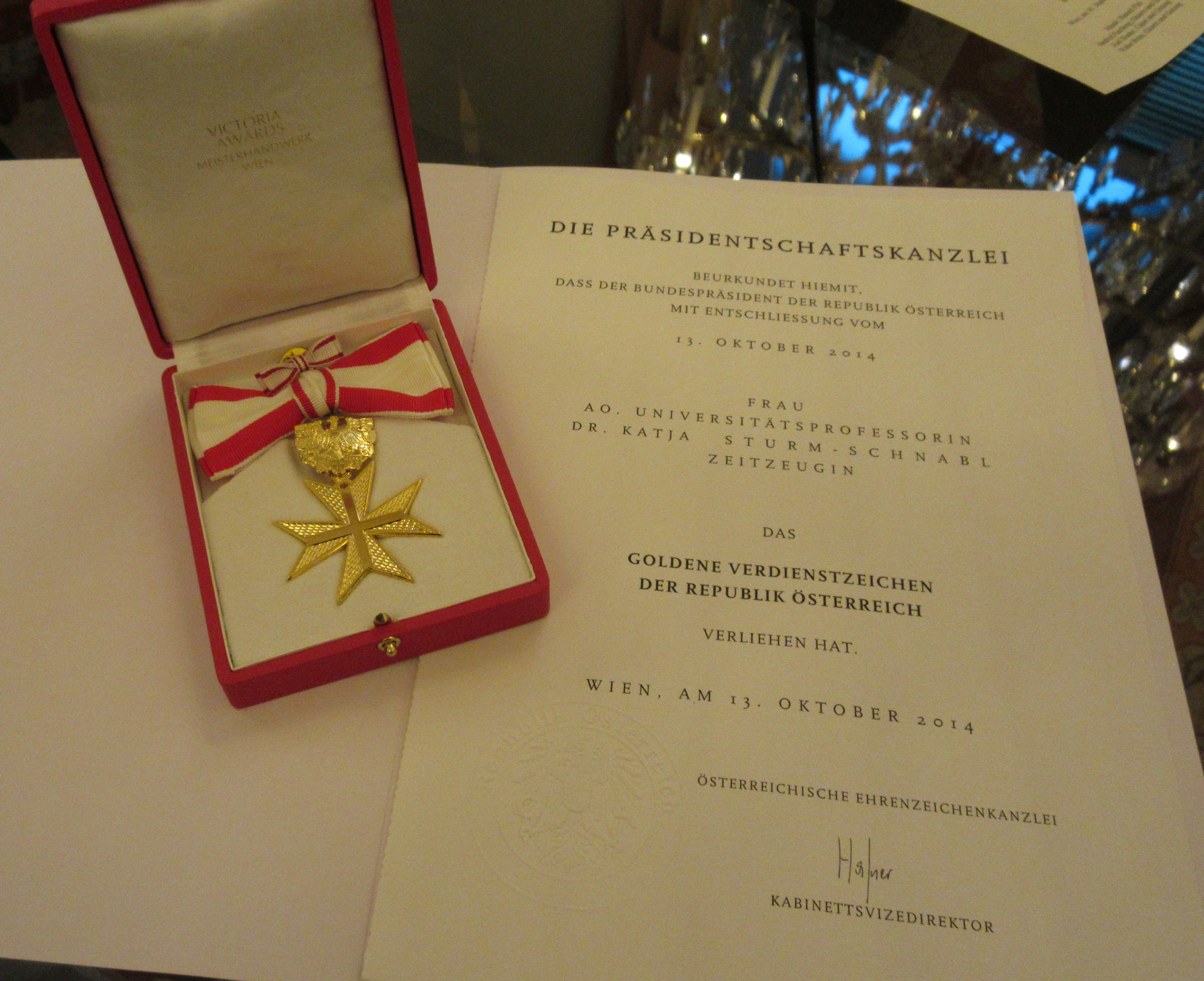
Golden Medal of the Republic of Austria awarded to Katja Sturm-Schnabl

- 2014 Gold Medal of Merit of the Republic of Austria to Katja Sturm-Schnabl for her efforts as a witness of the times.
- On 30 September 2015, Sturm-Schnabl was awarded the Gold Medal of Merit of the Republic of Austria by Chancellor Josef Ostermayer for her commitment as a contemporary witness.
- On 3 October 2019, she received the Vinzenz Rizzi Prize 2019 from the Central Association of Slovenian Organizations in Carinthia and the Slovenian Cultural Association in the Carinthian State Archive in Klagenfurt.
- On 1 September 2022, she was appointed honorary senator at the University of Vienna because she "was particularly committed to the university and to the fulfillment of her scientific tasks."

== Selected publications ==
Journal articles

- Schnabl, K. Š. (1989). Slovenski narodni preporod in njegovi neposredni odnosi s francoskim razsvetljenstvom in janzenizmom. Zgodovinski časopis, 43(3), 359–363.
- Sturm-Schnabl, K. (1991). Odmev francoske revolucije na slovenskem Koroškem. Zgodovinski časopis, 45(1), 47–53.
- Sturm-Schnabl, K. (1995). Dunajska slavistika in njen prispevek k slovenski kulturi. Zgodovinski časopis, 49(3), 411–420.
- Sturm-Schnabl, K. (2004). Aktualnost Miklošičevega znanstvenega dela in misli. Jezikoslovni zapiski, 10(2).
- Sturm-Schnabl, K. (2007). Miklosichs Bedeutung für die Slowenistik unter besonderer Berücksichtigung seiner Lesebücher für Mittelschulen. Wiener Slavistisches Jahrbuch, 229–239.
- Sturm-Schnabl, K. (2009). Cultural Nationalism in the South Slav Habsburg Lands in the Early Nineteenth Century: the Scholarly Network of Jernej Kopitar (1780–1844).

Editorial work

- Berta Bojetu: first international symposium: collection of lectures. Cologne: Mohorjeva, 2005.
- Bereiche der Slavistik: Festschrift zu Ehren von Josip Hamm. Wien: Verlag der Österreichischen Akademie der Wissenschaften, 1975.

Encyclopedia of Slovenian cultural history in Carinthia

- Katja Sturm-Schnabl, Bojan-Ilija Schnabl (ed./Hg.): Enzyklopädie der slowenischen Kulturgeschichte in Kärnten/Carinthia, Von den Anfängen bis 1942. Wien-Köln-Weimar, Böhlau Verlag 2016, 3 vol., 1603 p. http://www.boehlau-verlag.com/bilder/9783205796732.jpg
