= Slovene Studies =

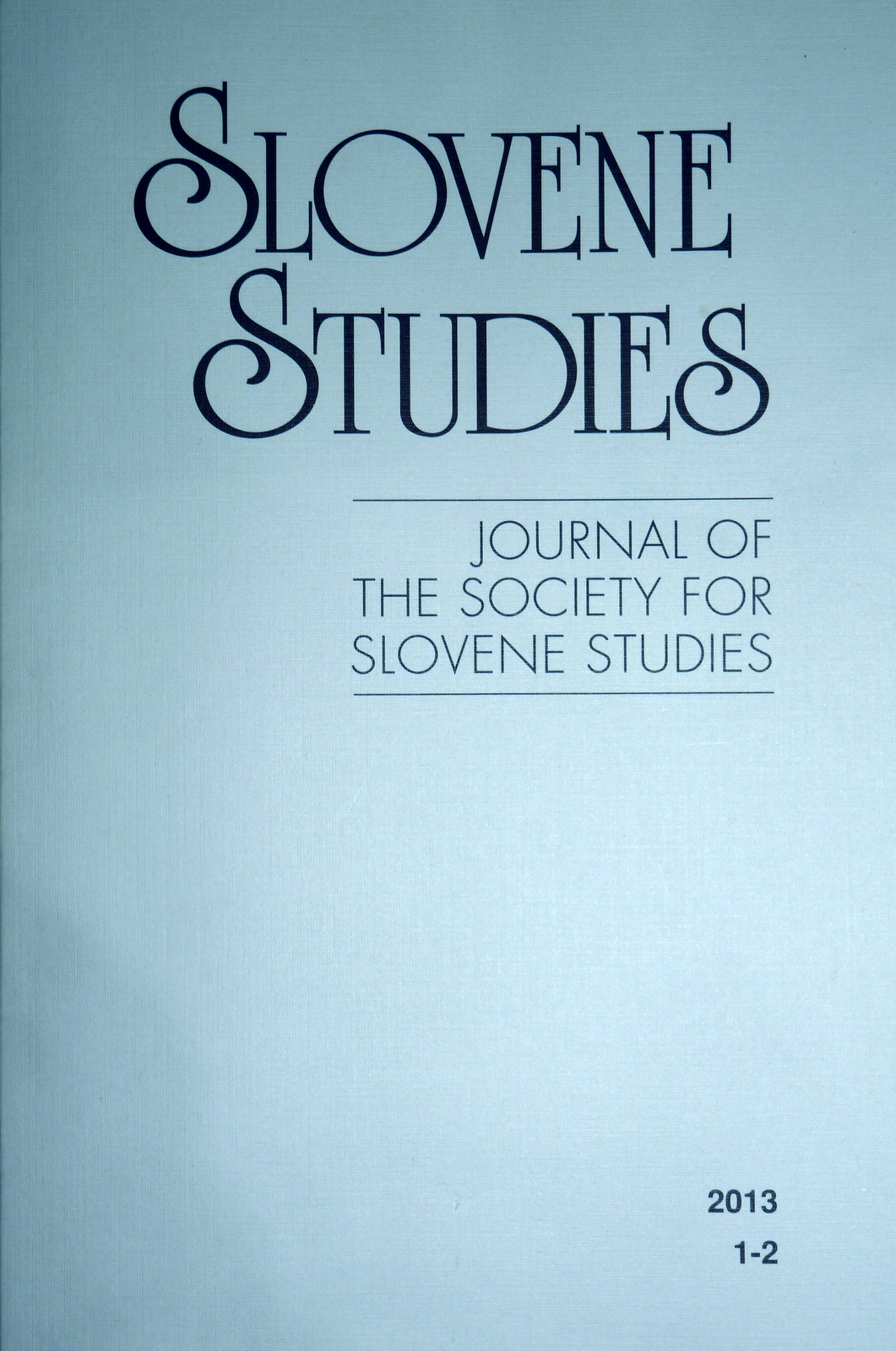
Slovene Studies

Slovene Studies is a peer-reviewed academic journal covering research on Slovenes as ethnic group and on Slovene culture. It is a leading peer reviewed journal in the field of Slovenian studies. It is published by the Society for Slovene Studies and was established in 1973 as Papers in Slovene Studies. It was originally edited by the Slovene linguist Rado Lenček. The journal has been published under its current title since 1979. The editor-in-chief is Timothy Pogacar (Bowling Green State University). The journal addresses international aspects of studies related to ethnic Slovenes and Slovene language and culture.
