= Novo Mesto Gymnasium =

Coordinates: 45°48′27″N 15°9′51″E

Novo Mesto Gymnasium (Gimnazija Novo mesto)
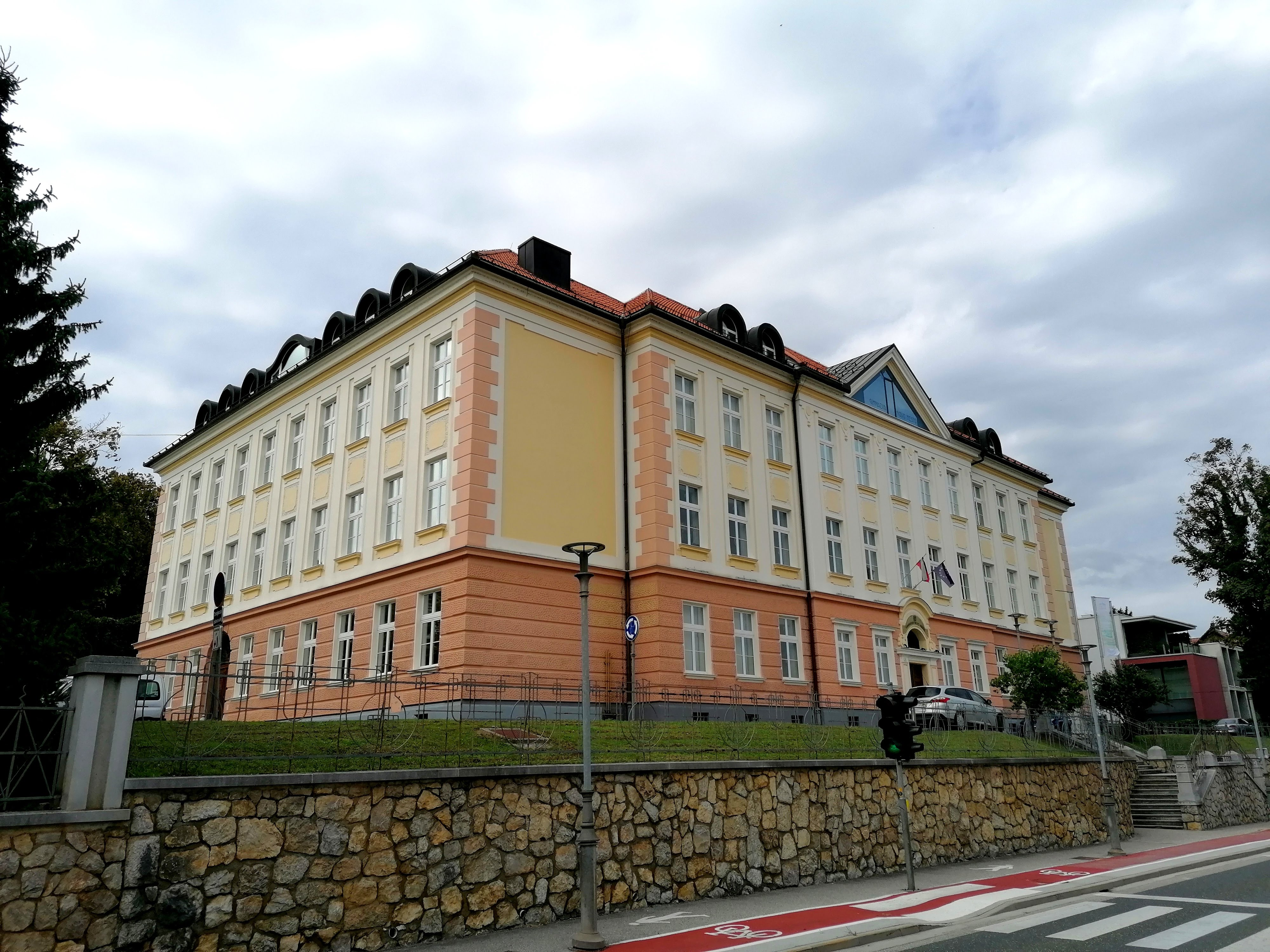

Location
- Seidlova 9 Novo Mesto, 8000; Slovenia

Information
- Type: Public School
- Motto: Pietati litterisque
- Established: 1746; 280 years ago
- Founder: Maria Theresa
- Headmistress: Mojca Lukšič
- Enrolment: 900
- Website: http://www.gimnm.org/domov/

The Novo Mesto Gymnasium (Slovene: Gimnazija Novo mesto) is a public gymnasium (secondary school for both boys and girls) located in Novo Mesto in the region of Lower Carniola, Slovenia.

It was founded in 1746 by the Habsburg ruler Maria Theresa of Austria and initially run by Franciscan friars. In 1870, the school became a state school and the current school building was built in 1912.

The school, the oldest in Slovenia, is the largest of the four Gymnasiums in Novo Mesto. It has a long list of distinguished alumni, among them many scientists and artists.

The school charges no tuition.

== Overview ==
Presently about 900 students between the ages of 15 and 19 are enrolled in the school (roughly 220 in each year group).

The school is supervised by the school board, comprising the headmaster, three representatives of the parents, five representatives of the school's employees (teachers), and two representatives of the founder (the government).

== History ==
The Novo Mesto Gymnasium is the oldest educational institution in Slovenia that has been in operation continually since its foundation. It was founded by Empress Maria Theresa in 1746. The school was first run by the Franciscans and the lessons started on November 3, 1746. The list of the first 66 students finishes off by a comment by the first dean Father Geodefredus Pfeifer (he said: we start with a modest and tiny flock). Being an educational and cultural institution, the Novo Mesto Gymnasium has played a significant role in the cultural, scientific, economic and political life of the Slovenes. It has educated several scientists, artists, economists and politicians.

In 1870 the school became a state school and the present school building was built in 1912. It was characterized by both world wars and consequently by the changes in the political system. Also, it was subject to different school reforms. In 1848 the duration of the schooling was lengthened from 6 years to 8 years.

Due to a new school reform in the 1980s the name gimnazija 'upper secondary school' was banned supposedly because of its supposed elitist connotations and it came to be called Natural Science and Technical School (Slovenian: Naravoslovno-matematična srednja šola). It was soon evident that only an upper secondary school can provide the needed broad knowledge and built-up skills that are essential for successful studies at university. As a result, there was a new school reform in 1990 and the school became an upper secondary school again.

Renovation work on the school building, which lasted 2 years, began with the celebration of its 250th anniversary in 1996. Better working conditions in the renovated school and modern classrooms meant an additional impetus for even better and more laborious work. In 2006 all of the school's 27 classrooms were equipped with computers and digital projectors and in 2011 interactive boards were installed in all classrooms.

== Notable alumni ==
1. Ivan Tavčar, writer and politician, 1866–1868
2. Oton Župančič, poet, translator and playwright, 1888–1891
3. Josip Plemelj, mathematician, 1893–1894
4. Dragotin Kette, poet, 1896–1898
5. Anton Podbevšek, poet, 1909–1918
6. Miran Jarc, poet, 1910–1919
7. Božidar Jakac, painter, 1910–1918
8. Leon Štukelj, athlete and Olympic gold medallist, 1910–1916
9. Rado Lenček, linguist, ethnologist, finished in 1940
10. Pino Mlakar, ballet dancer, 1917–1919
11. Marjan Kozina, composer, 1917–1925
12. Edvard Ravnikar, architect
13. Igor Bavčar, politician
14. Igor Lukšič, politician
15. Lojze Peterle, politician
16. Gregor Golobič, politician

== Notable instructors ==
- Ferdo Kozak, writer, public intellectual and politician.
- Fran Detela, writer and university professor.
