= Novo Mesto =

Novo Mesto Novo mesto
- Town
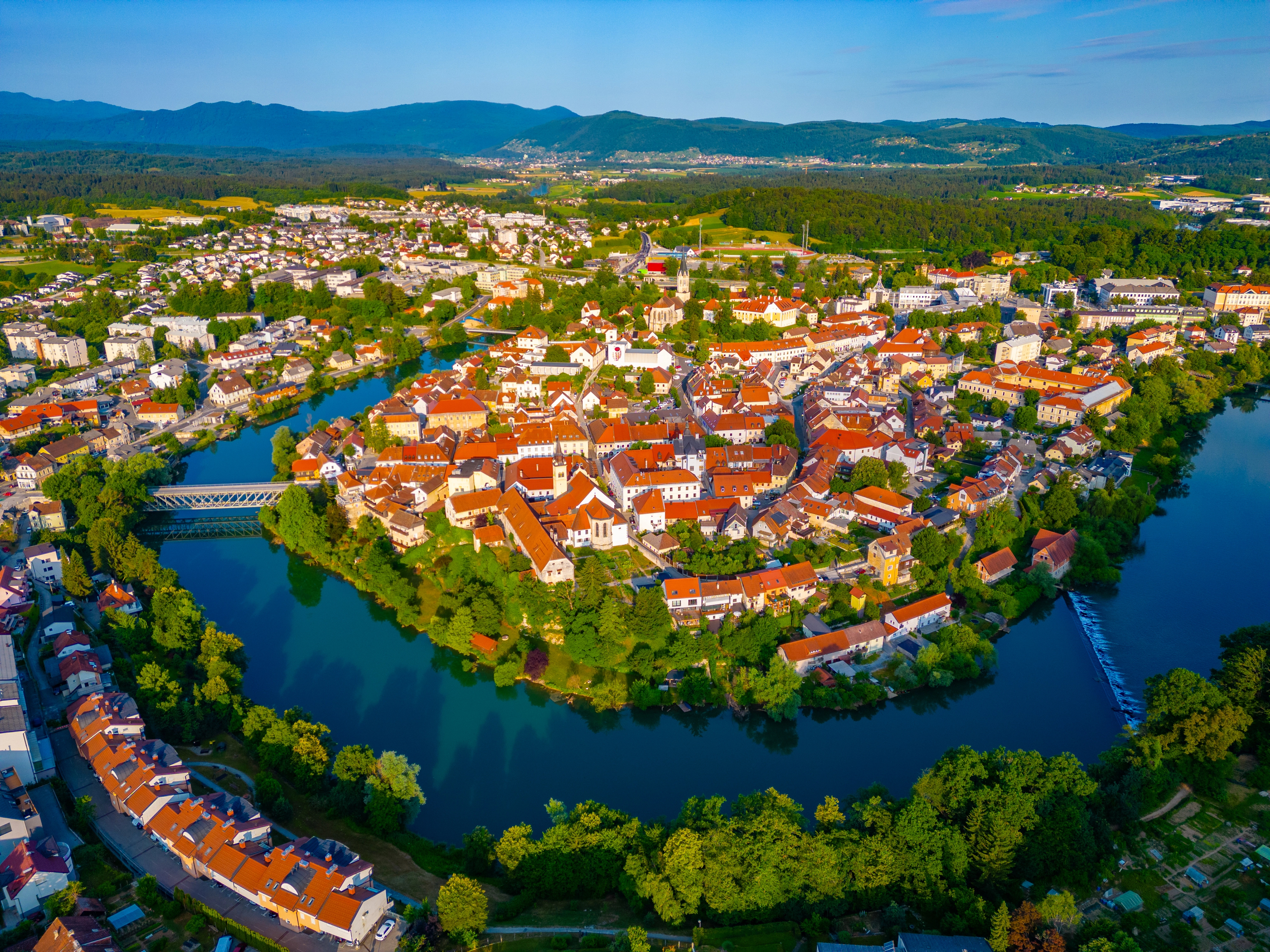
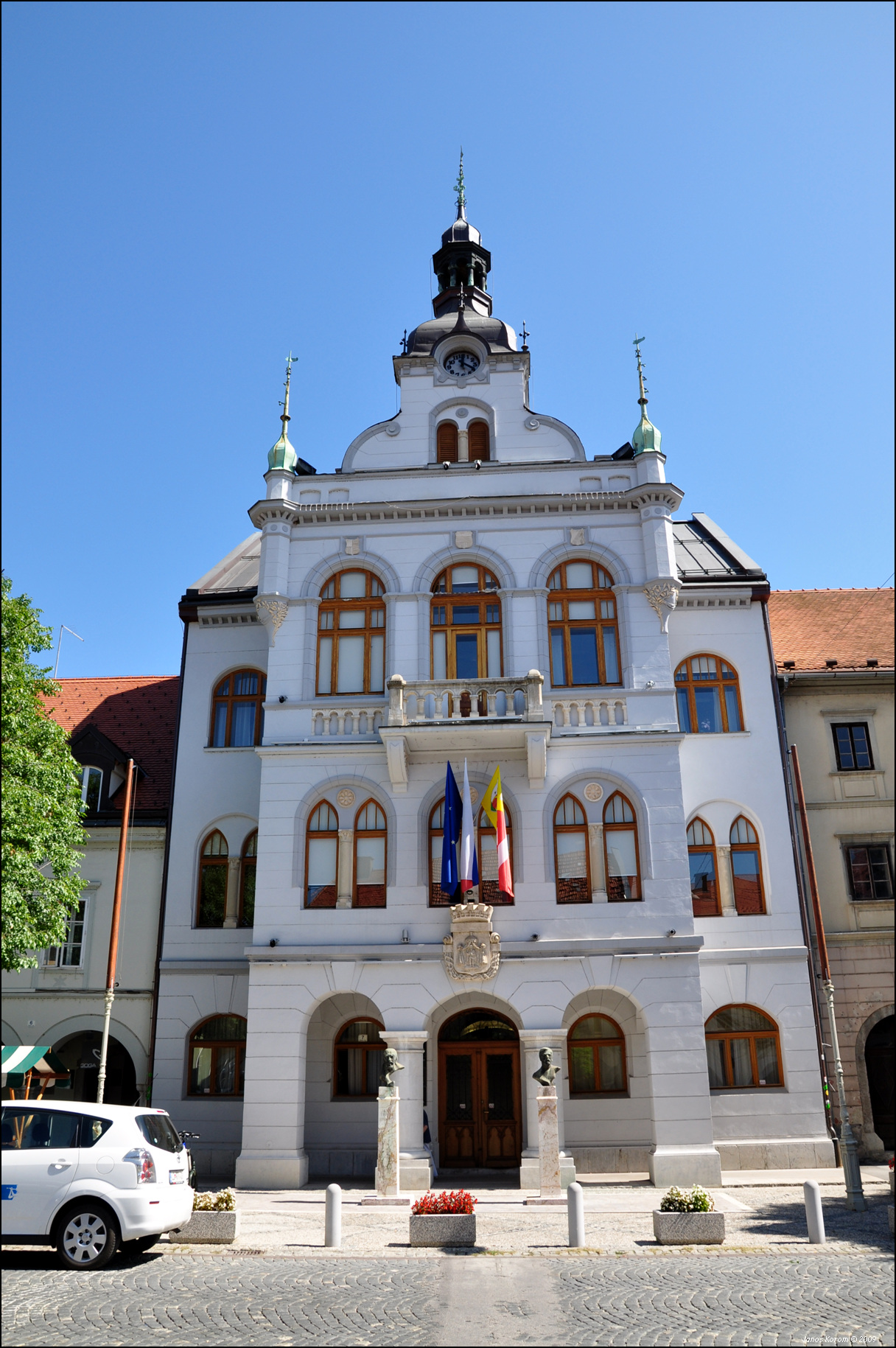
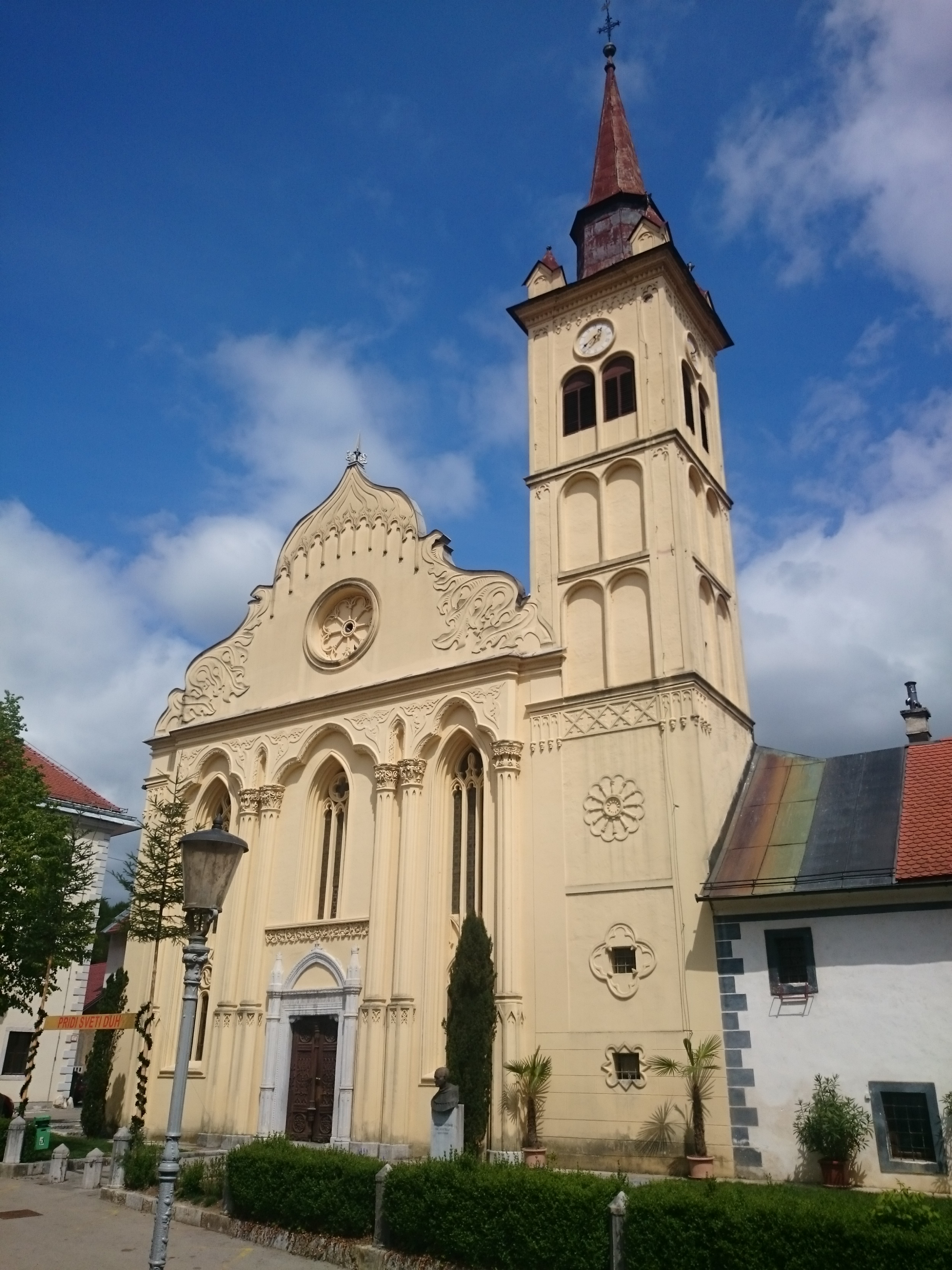
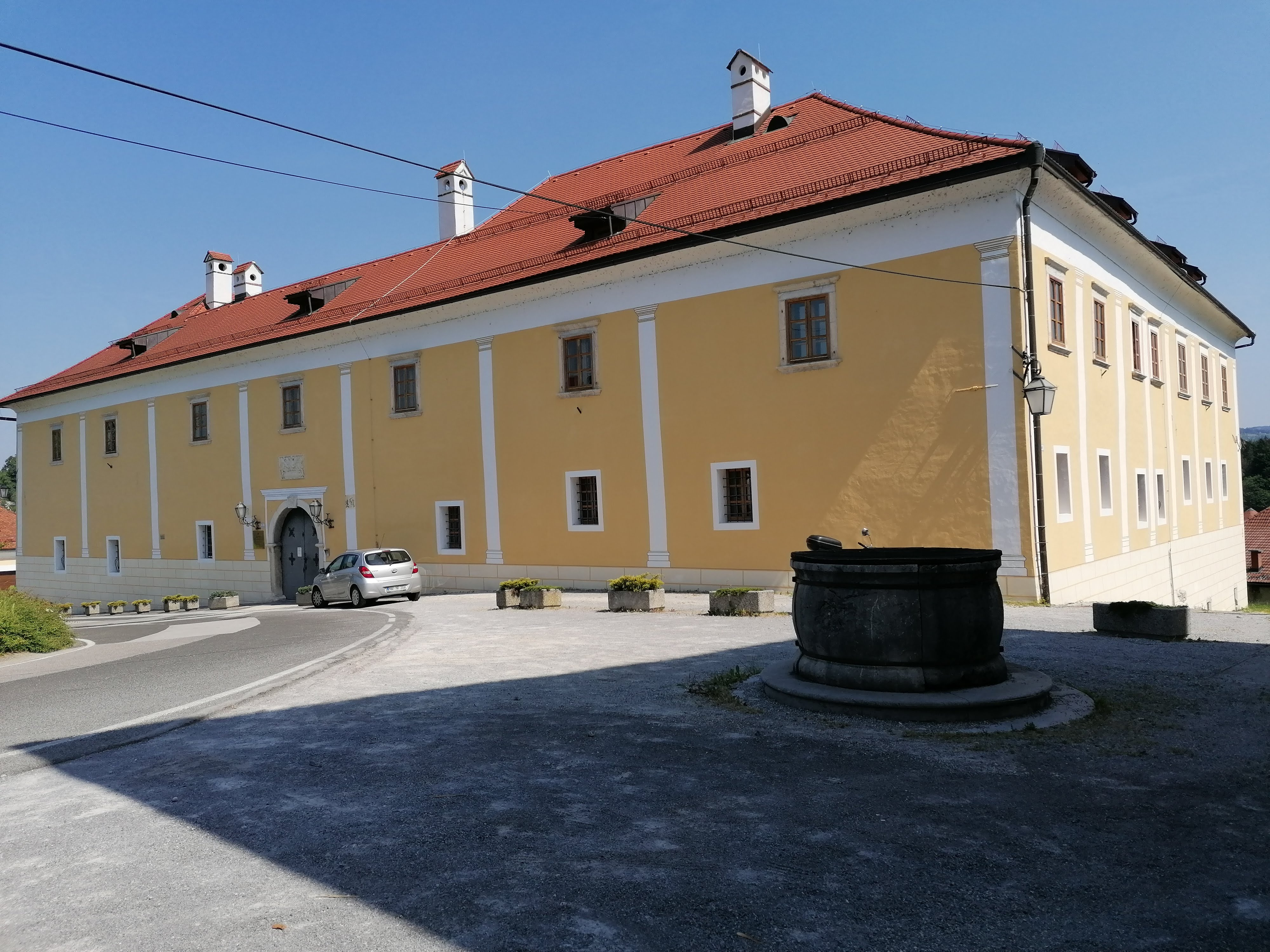
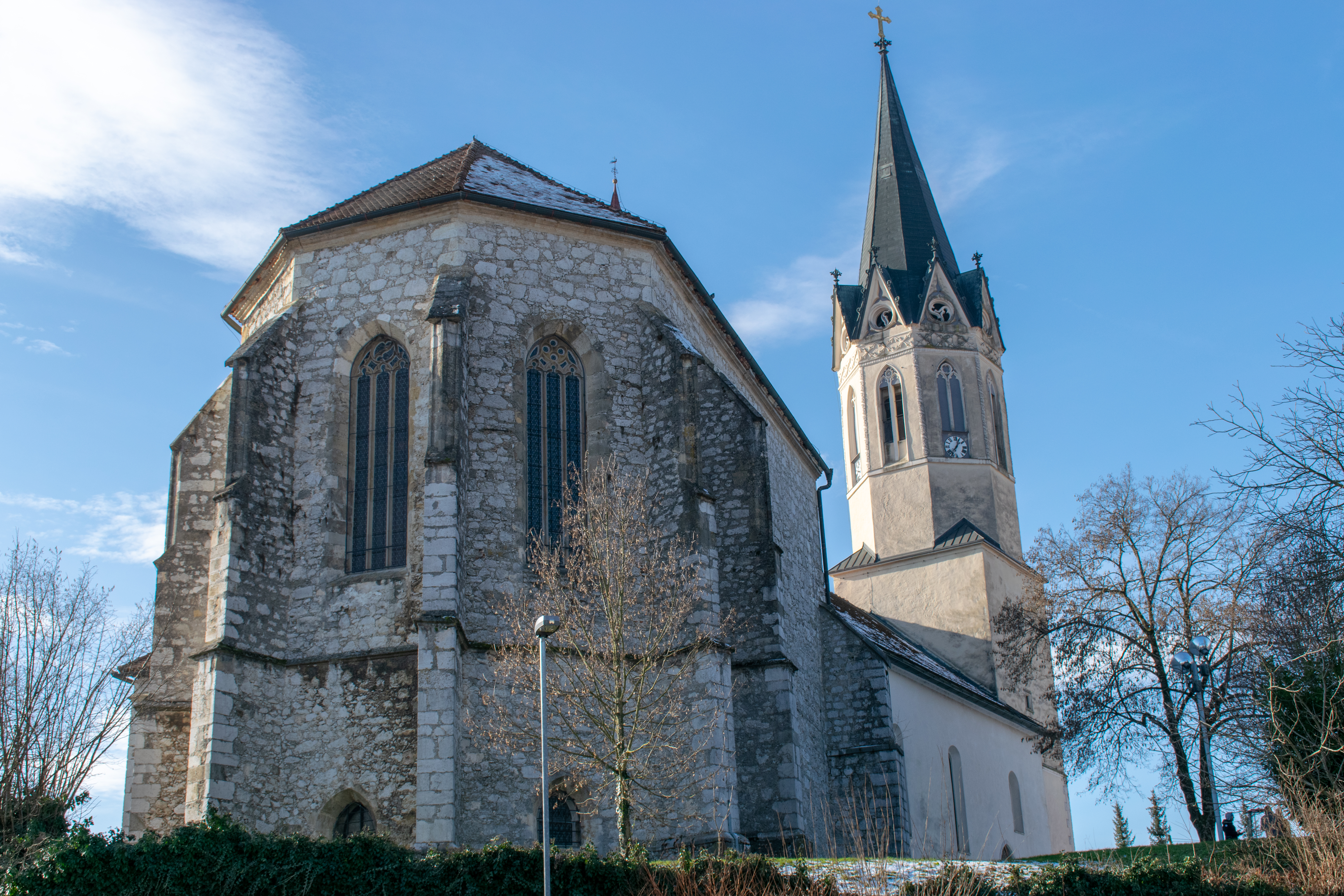
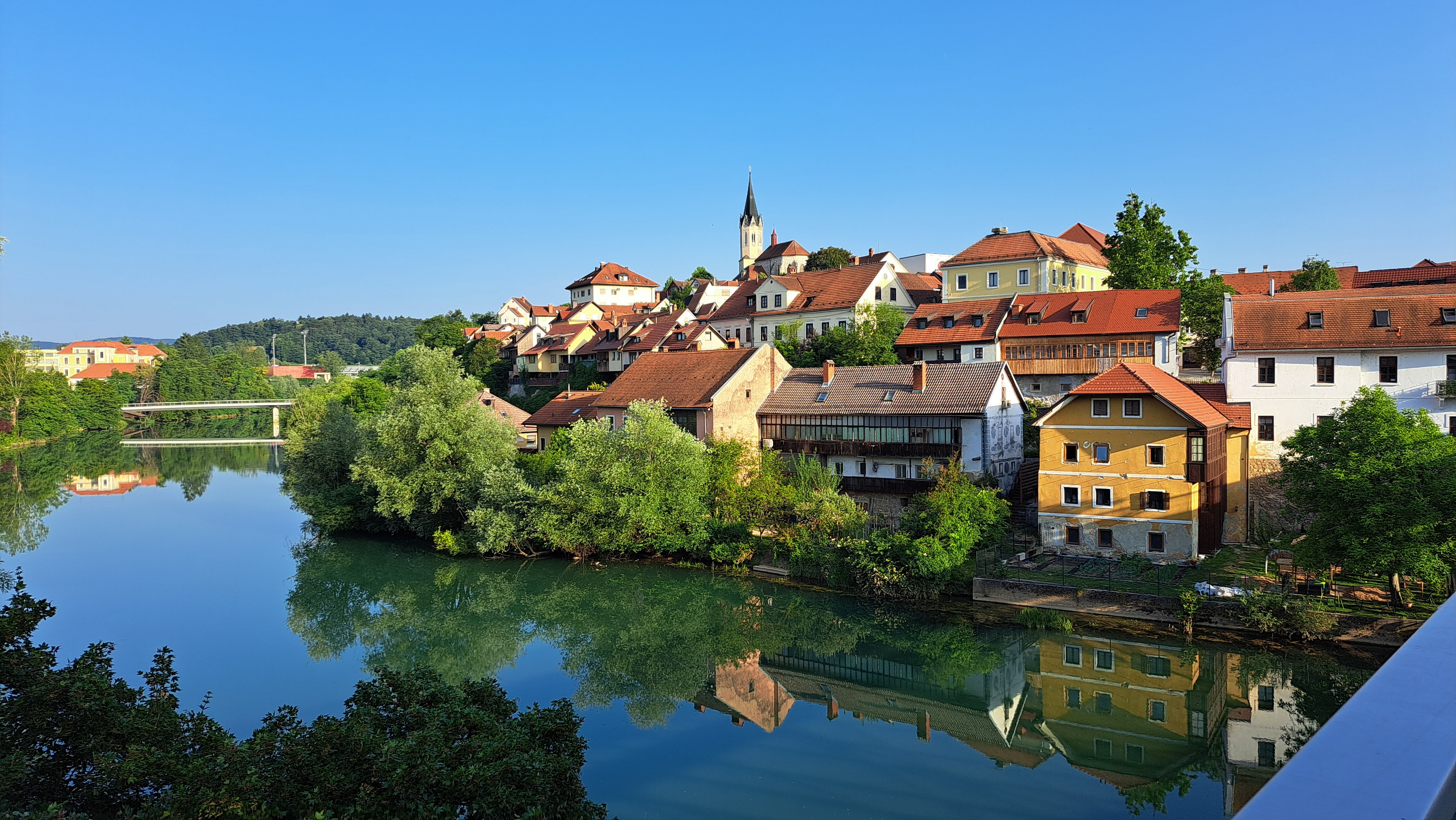
- View from above with the Krka River Town Hall St. Leonard's Church Diocesan Manor Novo Mesto Cathedral View with the Krka River

- Flag Coat of arms
- Nickname: City of Situlas
- Interactive map of Novo Mesto
- Location within Slovenia
- Coordinates: 45°48′N 15°10′E
- Country: Slovenia
- Traditional region: Lower Carniola
- Statistical region: Southeast Slovenia
- Municipality: Novo Mesto
- Founded: 7 April 1365 as Růdolfswerde
- Founder: Rudolf IV of Austria

Government
  - Mayor: Gregor Macedoni (Independent)

Area
  - Total: 33.3 km^{2} (12.9 sq mi)
- Elevation: 181 m (594 ft)

Population (2026)
  - Total: 24,741
  - Density: 743/km^{2} (1,920/sq mi)
- Time zone: UTC+01 (CET)
  - Summer (DST): UTC+02 (CEST)
- Postal code: 8000
- Vehicle registration: NM
- Source: Statistical Office of the Republic of Slovenia, census of 2002.

Novo Mesto (pronounced [ˈnɔ̀ːʋɔ ˈmèːstɔ]; Slovene: Novo mesto; also known by alternative names) is the seventh-largest city of Slovenia. It is the economic and cultural centre of the traditional region of Lower Carniola (southeastern Slovenia) and the seat of the City Municipality of Novo Mesto. It lies on a bend of the Krka River, close to the border with Croatia.

== Name ==
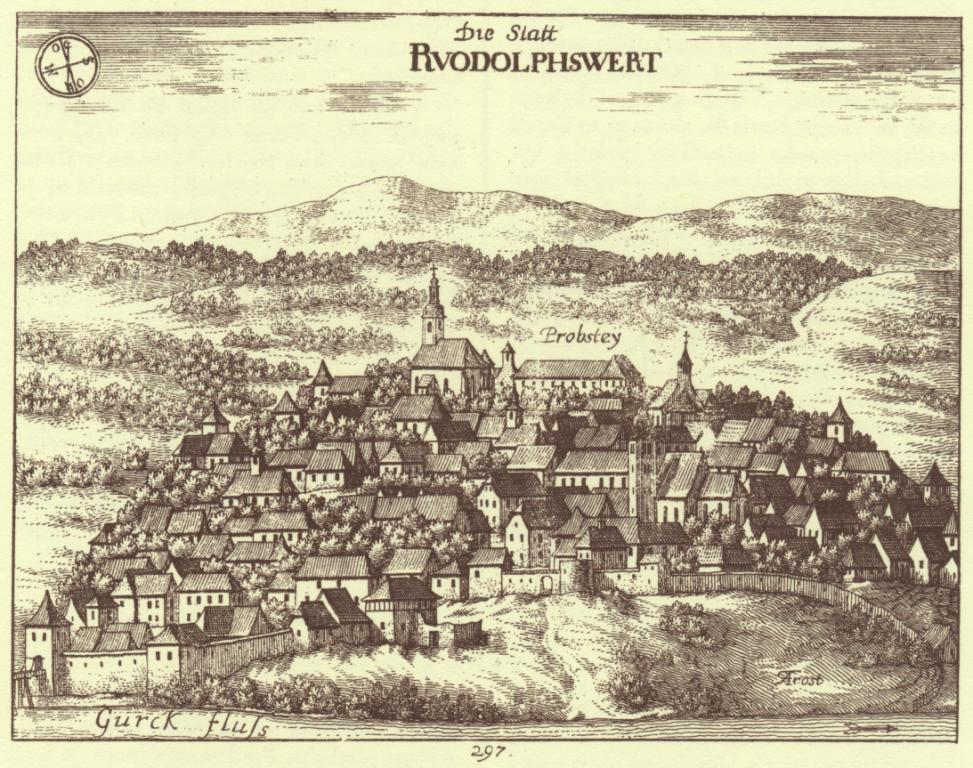
Ruodolphswert, engraving by Valvasor, 1689

Novo Mesto was attested in historical sources in 1365 as Růdolfswerde (and as Rudolfswerd in 1392 and Noua Mesta in 1419). The German name (spelled Rudolfswerth in the modern era) is a compound of the personal name Rudolf and wert 'island, peninsula, land above the water', and refers to Rudolf IV, Duke of Austria, who conferred town rights upon the settlement in 1365. The parallel German name Neustadtl was also in use (attested as Newestat in 1365, and probably a translation of the Slovene name). The name used for the settlement before 1365 is unknown. The Slovene name Novo mesto literally means 'new town'; names like this are common in Europe and generally refer to settlements built at a site where an older one was burned or otherwise destroyed. From 1865 to 1918, the town was officially named Rudolfovo in Slovene, based on the German name. Following World War I and the dissolution of Austria-Hungary, the city became part of the Kingdom of Yugoslavia and was officially renamed Novo mesto.

== History ==
Novo Mesto has been settled since prehistory. The city is one of the most important archeological sites of the Hallstatt culture (Early Iron Age) in Europe and has been nicknamed the "City of Situlas" after numerous situlas found in the area. Graben Castle on the Krka River, ancestral seat of the noble House of Graben von Stein, was first mentioned in an 1170 deed. The town itself was founded by the Habsburg archduke Rudolf IV of Austria on 7 April 1365 as Rudolfswerth. The Austrian Habsburgs received the Carniolan March from the hands of Louis IV, the Holy Roman Emperor, King of Italy and Duke of Bavaria, in 1335 and in 1364 Rudolf "the Founder" proclaimed himself a Duke of Carniola. The city was connected to the Southern lands since the 1600s by the Kandija Bridge originally a wooden structure, since the 1800s an iron bridge.

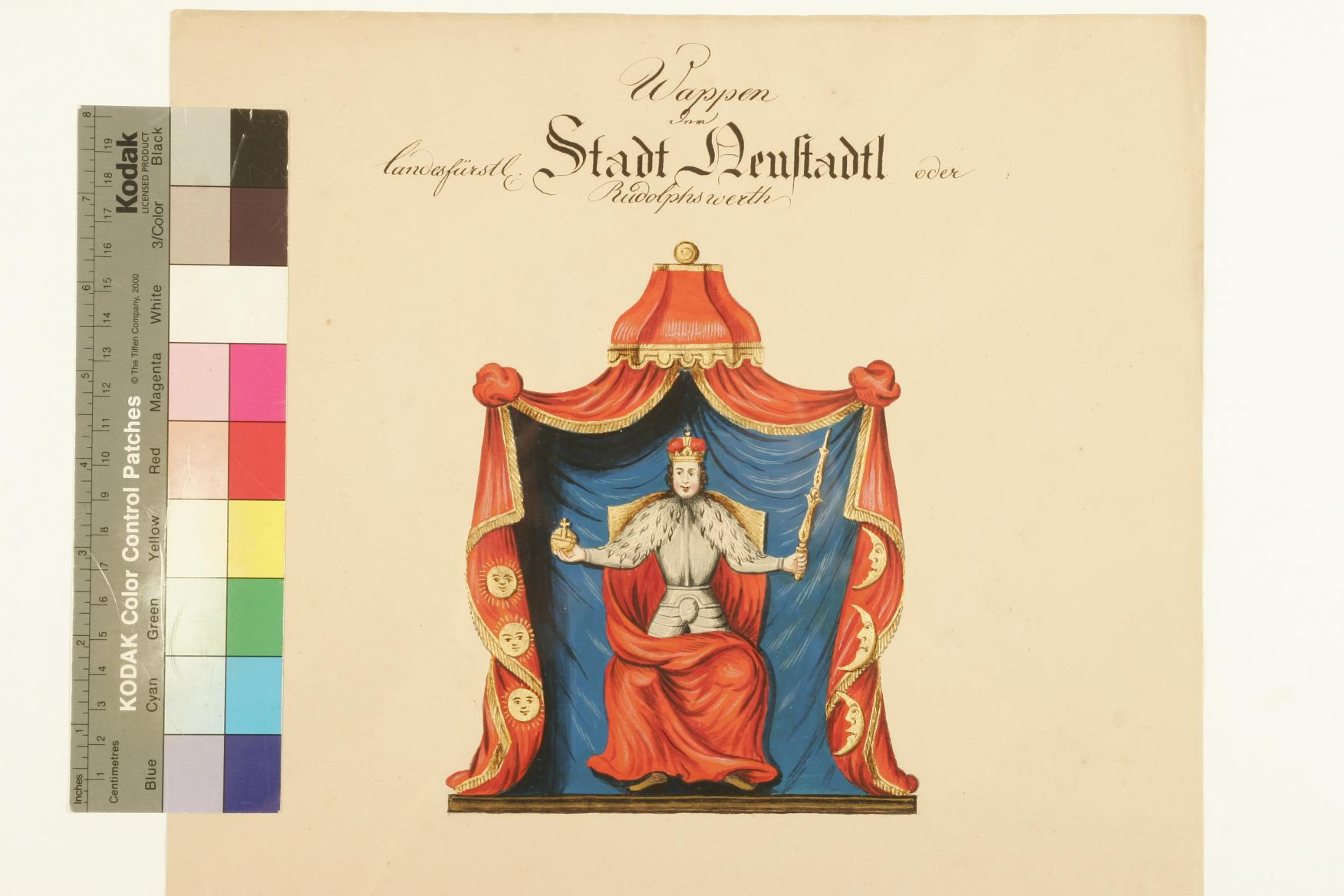
Old coat of arms of Novo Mesto

During World War II, the city was controlled by Fascist Italy as part of the Province of Ljubljana until Mussolini's downfall in 1943. It was then occupied by Nazi Germany until the end of the war. In 1958, the authorities of the Socialist Federal Republic of Yugoslavia had a motorway built connecting the Slovenian capital Ljubljana and Zagreb in Croatia, which passed through Novo Mesto. The A2 motorway is today part of the European route E70. With its construction, Novo Mesto became much better connected to the rest of Slovenia and the rest of Yugoslavia, and began to grow as an important regional center.

== Demographics ==
The population of Novo Mesto is predominantly ethnically Slovene. On the southeast outskirts of the town there is a Roma settlement called Žabjak, also known as Brezje.

Demographic evolution

1948	1953	1961	1971	1981	1991	2002	2011	2013	2015	2024	2026
6,645	7,526	9,873	14,144	19,741	22,333	22,415	23,341	23,212	23,317	24,446	24,741

== Climate ==
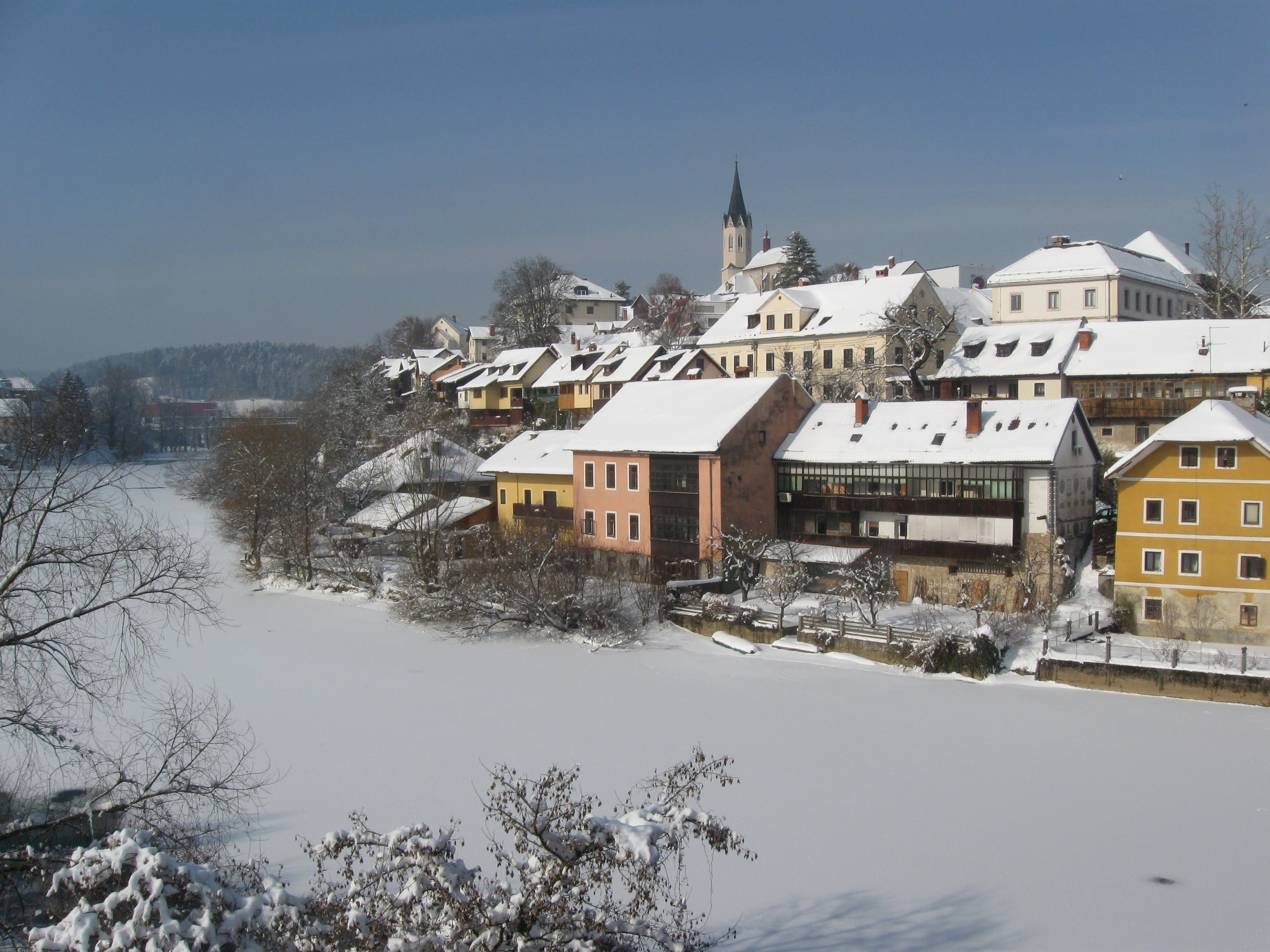
Frozen Krka in 2012

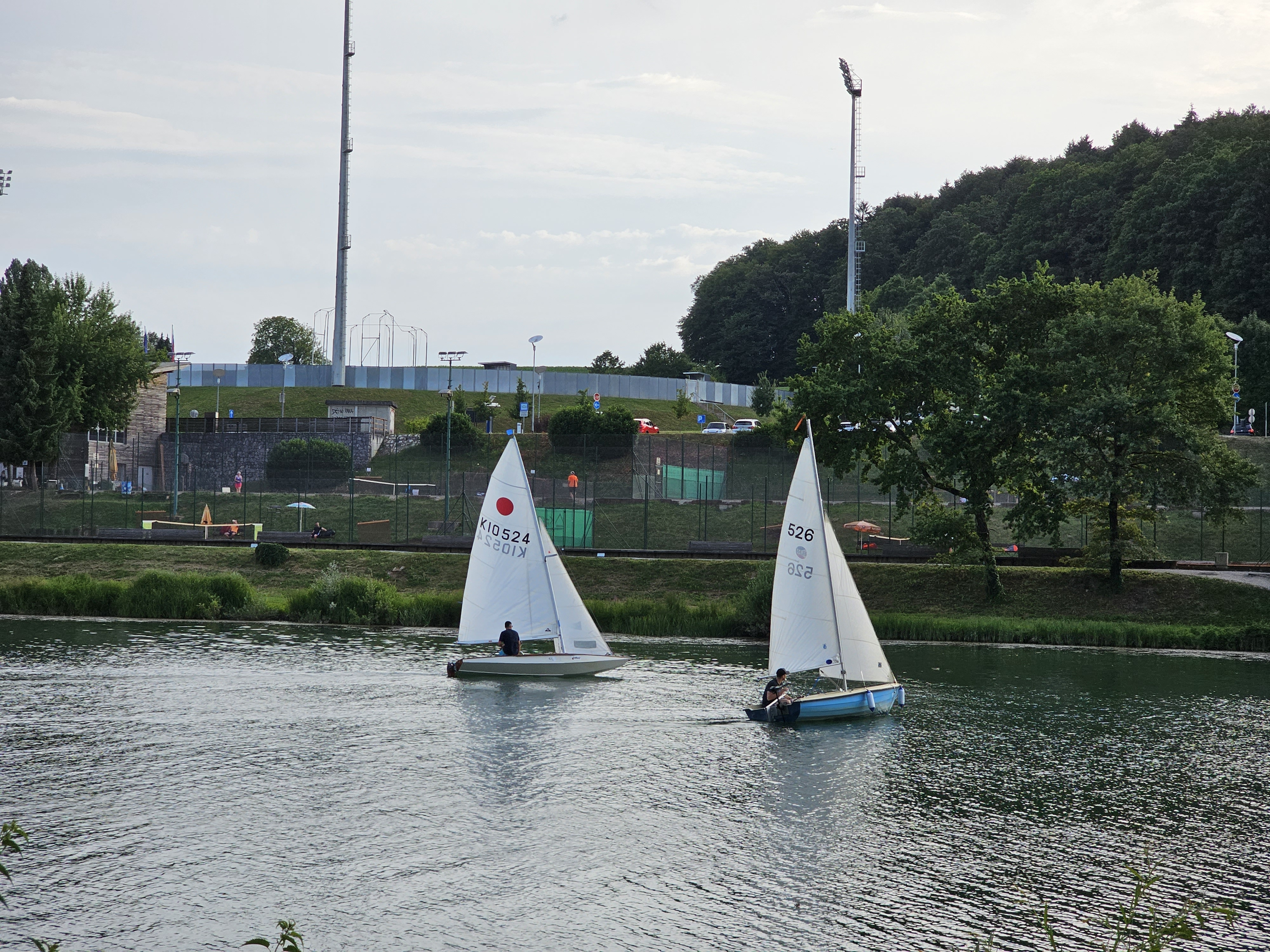
Sailing on the Krka below Portoval

Novo Mesto has a humid subtropical climate, which is influenced by several factors: the Dinaric Alps, the Alps, the Adriatic Sea, and the continental background. Despite the fact that town is close to the 46th parallel north, the climate is much warmer than places at similar latitudes in North America and East Asia. Prevailing western winds bring warm and moist air from the Atlantic and Mediterranean. Lying in partial rain shadow, precipitation is much lower than just 20 km (12 mi) to the west, and foehn winds blowing from southwest over the Dinaric alps can bring very warm weather in any month of the year. From the northeast, the town is exposed to cold air originating in eastern Europe and Siberia, which in winter can bring very cold and sometimes snowy weather. The coldest temperature of −25.6 °C was recorded on 17 February 1952, and the highest, 39.9 °C, on 8 August 2013. Precipitation is abundant, most of it failing as rain in warmer months, between May and November. Hail and heavy thunderstorms are very common between May and September, and snow regularly occurs between December and February. Snow is not uncommon in November and March and rare in October and April. Snow fell as early as 21 October 1971 and as late as 20 May 1969. The greatest snow depth was recorded on 17 February 1969, measuring 103 cm. The wettest year on record was 2014, with 1,482 mm of precipitation, and the driest was 2000, with 827 mm.

Climate data for Novo Mesto (1991–2020 normals, extremes 1950–2020)
Month	Jan	Feb	Mar	Apr	May	Jun	Jul	Aug	Sep	Oct	Nov	Dec	Year
Record high °C (°F)	17.2 (63.0)	21.4 (70.5)	25.8 (78.4)	29.0 (84.2)	33.1 (91.6)	36.7 (98.1)	38.0 (100.4)	39.9 (103.8)	33.0 (91.4)	28.1 (82.6)	23.7 (74.7)	19.8 (67.6)	39.9 (103.8)
Mean daily maximum °C (°F)	4.7 (40.5)	7.3 (45.1)	12.3 (54.1)	17.2 (63.0)	21.7 (71.1)	25.5 (77.9)	27.6 (81.7)	27.3 (81.1)	21.6 (70.9)	16.2 (61.2)	10.1 (50.2)	4.9 (40.8)	16.4 (61.5)
Daily mean °C (°F)	0.7 (33.3)	2.1 (35.8)	6.5 (43.7)	11.1 (52.0)	15.6 (60.1)	19.5 (67.1)	21.2 (70.2)	20.5 (68.9)	15.4 (59.7)	10.8 (51.4)	6.1 (43.0)	1.2 (34.2)	10.9 (51.6)
Mean daily minimum °C (°F)	−2.6 (27.3)	−2.1 (28.2)	1.3 (34.3)	5.4 (41.7)	9.7 (49.5)	13.5 (56.3)	15.1 (59.2)	15.0 (59.0)	10.9 (51.6)	7.0 (44.6)	3.1 (37.6)	−1.6 (29.1)	6.2 (43.2)
Record low °C (°F)	−23.5 (−10.3)	−25.2 (−13.4)	−22.1 (−7.8)	−6.9 (19.6)	−4.2 (24.4)	1.1 (34.0)	4.9 (40.8)	3.9 (39.0)	−1.1 (30.0)	−6.6 (20.1)	−15 (5)	−19.6 (−3.3)	−25.2 (−13.4)
Average precipitation mm (inches)	56 (2.2)	70 (2.8)	60 (2.4)	83 (3.3)	103 (4.1)	105 (4.1)	99 (3.9)	112 (4.4)	136 (5.4)	120 (4.7)	111 (4.4)	82 (3.2)	1,137 (44.8)
Average extreme snow depth cm (inches)	6 (2.4)	7 (2.8)	2 (0.8)	0 (0)	0 (0)	0 (0)	0 (0)	0 (0)	0 (0)	0 (0)	2 (0.8)	5 (2.0)	1.9 (0.7)
Average precipitation days (≥ 0.1 mm)	11	10	11	13	14	13	12	11	13	14	15	13	151
Average snowy days (≥ 0 cm)	15	13	6	1	0	0	0	0	0	0	4	12	51
Average relative humidity (%) (at 14:00)	73	61	54	52	52	54	52	54	60	66	73	79	61
Mean monthly sunshine hours	79.4	108.2	155.5	184.6	232.2	255.8	288.3	267.3	181.7	129.1	66.9	61.4	2,010.4
Source 1: Slovenian Environment Agency (humidity and snow 1981–2010)
Source 2: NOAA (sun 1991–2020), Ogimet

== Culture ==
Novo Mesto has been a hub of artistic creation in various fields: music, literature, and visual arts. The turning point is the September 1920 exhibition named Novo Mesto Spring, which brought together artists of different genres and marks the beginning of avant-garde art in Slovenia.

=== Music ===
The development of music in Novo Mesto may be traced to the 16th century, with the clergy, e.g. the provost George Slatkonia, the first residential Bishop of Vienna, promulgating the development of vocal music. In 1498 Slatkonia was appointed the singing master (Singmeister) of the choir later known as the Vienna Boys' Choir.

Accelerated development took place in the 19th century with the establishment of a brass band in 1846, and the establishment of the Lower Carniola Singing Society in 1884. The society laid the foundations of the vocal music in the wider Lower Carniola area. A significant part in the musical development of the town was contributed by students and the teaching staff of the Novo Mesto Grammar School. The school had a quality singing choir led by Hugolin Sattner, Aleš Ottokar and Ignacij Hladnik as well as a student orchestra led by Viktor Parma. In 1886, a male choir was established in the town in the frame of the Catholic Craftsman Assistants Society. Several classical composers were connected to Novo Mesto, the best known of them being Marjan Kozina, after whom the music school of the town is named, and the expressionist composer Marij Kogoj. In the 20th century, particularly after World War II, a number of influential contemporary (jazz, rock, and pop) music groups appeared and created in the town, the most notable of them being Rudolfovo, Dan D and others. In the early 21st century, the most popular pop-rock music group was Dan D, whereas classical music gained two important pieces of work in the frame of the George Slatkonia Vocal Academy, a chamber opera (The Baptism on the Savica) and Te Deum, a monumental cantata work.

=== Literature ===
Among the literary figures associated with Novo Mesto are the writer Janez Trdina (1830–1905), the poet Dragotin Kette (1876–1899), and the poet and essayist Anton Podbevšek (1898–1981).

Trdina, after whom the town's central cultural venue, the Janez Trdina Cultural Centre, is named, lived in Novo Mesto during a period of exile. He wrote mainly short prose works inspired by the Gorjanci hills, later published under the title Fairytales and Stories about Gorjanci (Bajke in povesti o Gorjancih).

Kette lived in Novo Mesto while studying there and wrote lyric poetry, including poems dedicated to Angela Smola, whom he met at the town's chapter church. Podbevšek was among the early representatives of the Slovene lyrical avant-garde. The Anton Podbevšek Theatre, founded in 2005 as the town's first professional theatre, was named after him.

=== Visual and film arts ===
Novo Mesto is the birthplace of the painter and graphic artist Božidar Jakac (1899–1989), who produced one of the most extensive oeuvres of visual arts in Slovenia and was a key organiser of visual arts education and visual arts events in the country. Many of his works as well as of other well-known Slovenian artists are kept at the Jakac House in the town. Other known Novo Mesto visual artists were the painter Vladimir Lamut and the architect Marjan Mušič. Several notable film artists originate from Novo Mesto, besides Jakac also the film editor Jurij Moškon, and the contemporary film directors Rok Biček, Klemen Dvornik, Nejc Gazvoda, and Žiga Virc.

== Religion ==
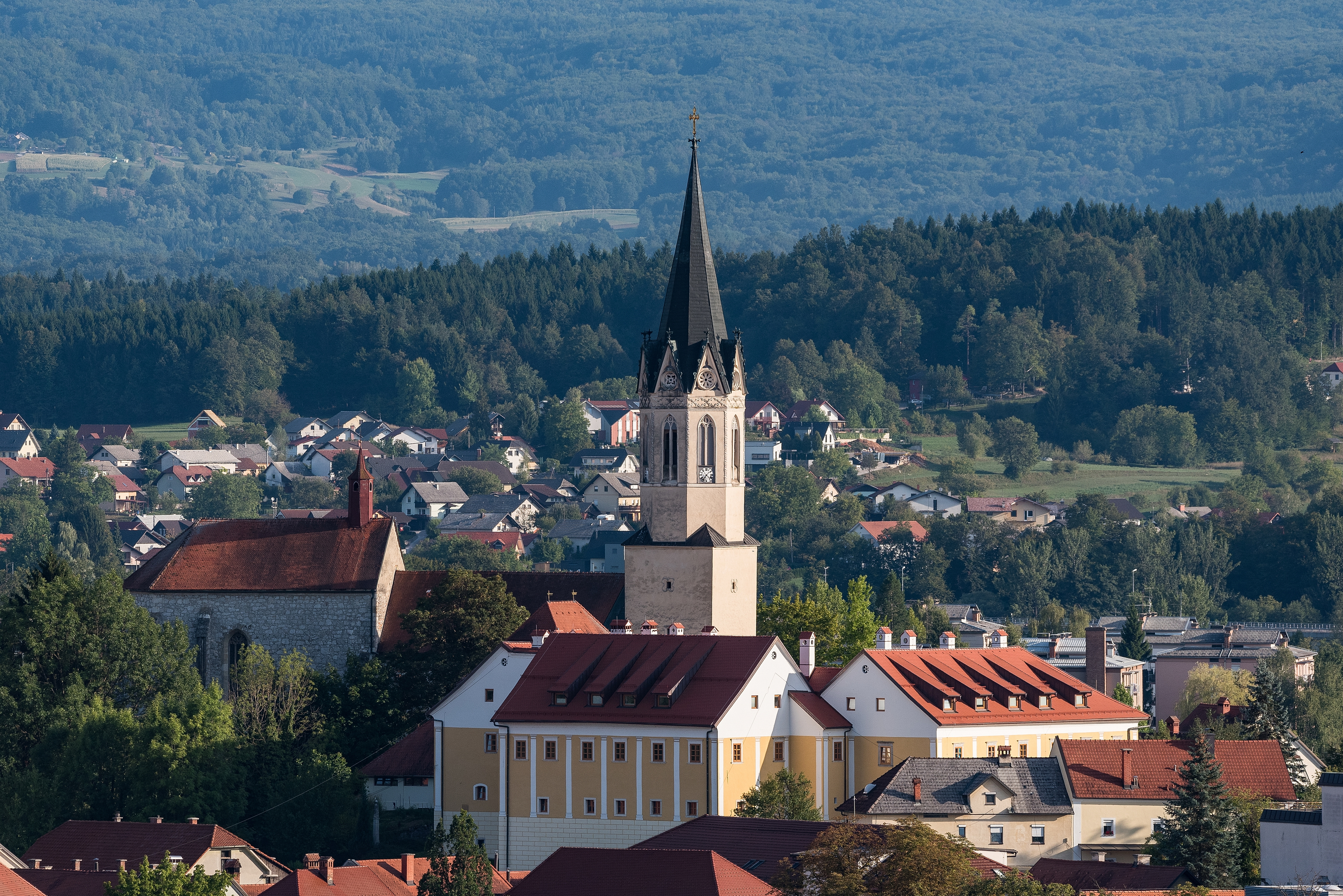
Novo Mesto Cathedral from distance

On 7 April 2006, Novo Mesto became the seat of the Roman Catholic Diocese of Novo Mesto, which is a suffragan of the Archdiocese of Ljubljana.

=== Cathedral ===
Novo Mesto Cathedral, standing on Kapitelj Hill above the town, is dedicated to Saint Nicholas and is an originally Gothic building that was rebuilt in the Baroque style in the 17th century. The main altar oil painting by Tintoretto, and the side altar paintings by the French 18th century painter Valentin Metzinger, the leading Baroque painter in Slovenia, are on display in the church.

== Economy ==
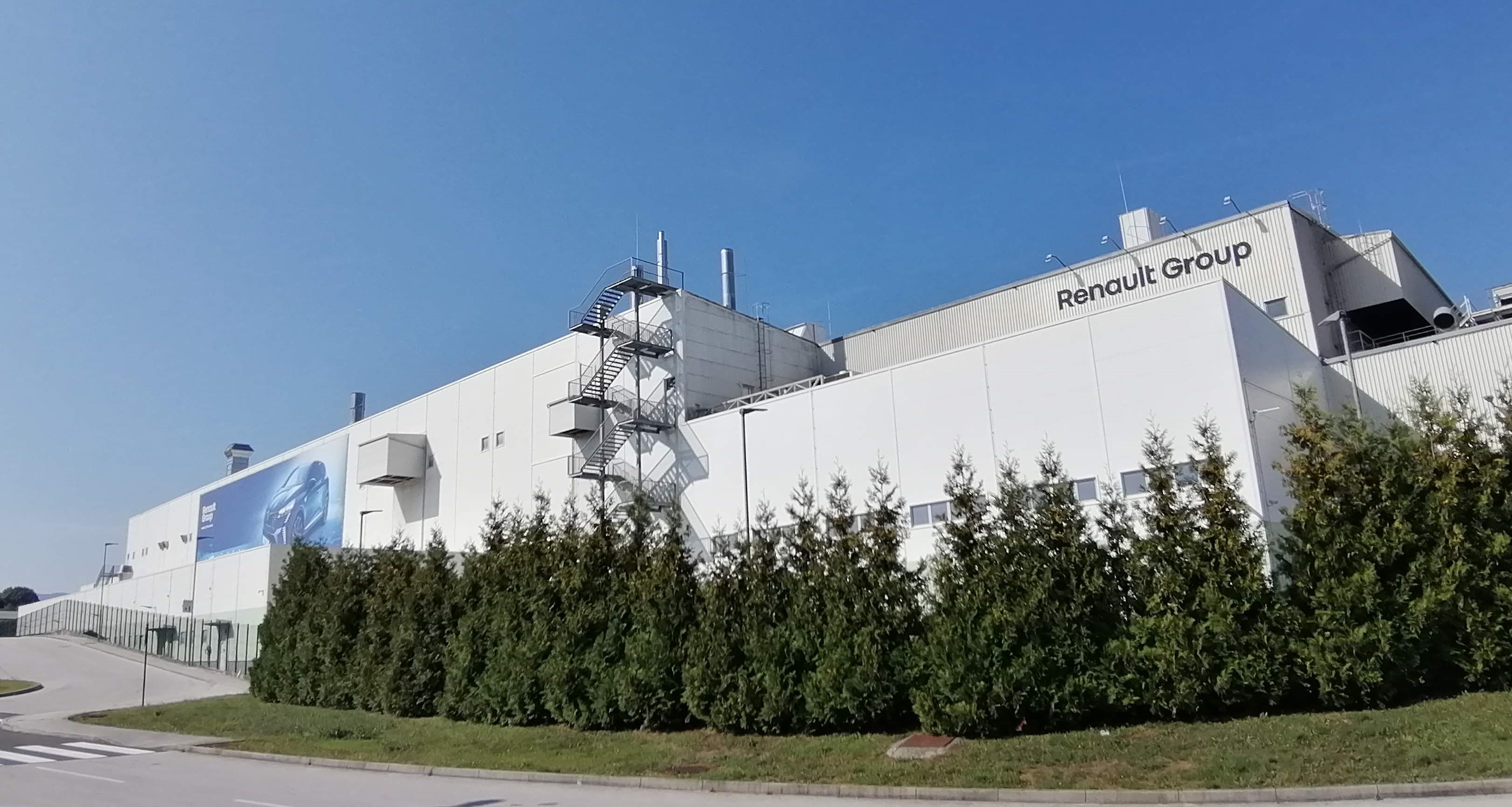
Revoz Renault factory

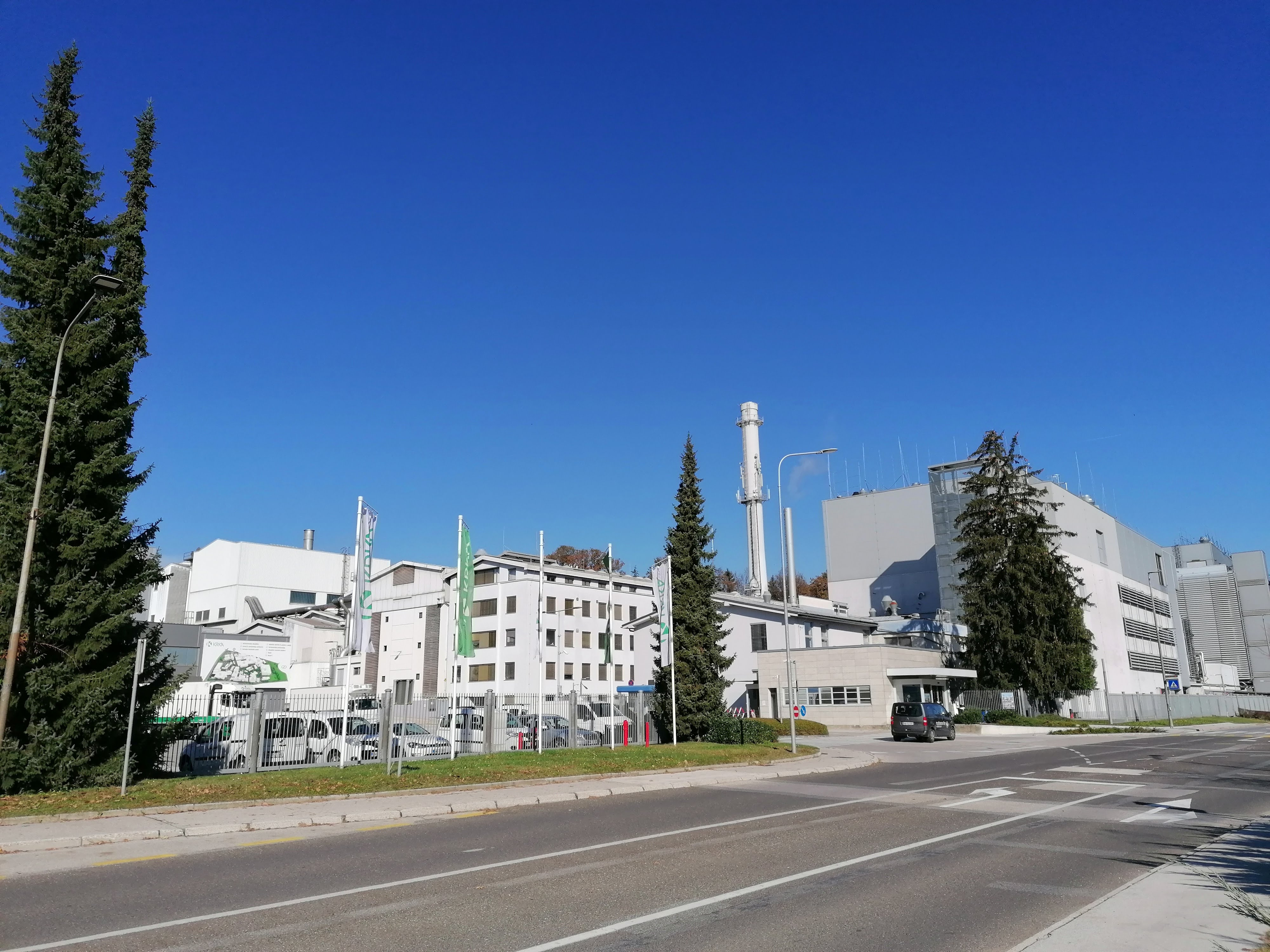
Krka pharmaceutical plant

Today, tourism is increasing in Slovenia, and Novo Mesto is feeling some of the effects. The Krka Valley is becoming a place for wine enthusiasts who take tours throughout the Lower Carniola region, tasting locally produced Cviček wine, which is produced by blending several different varieties of local wine.

Major industries include:

- Revoz (subsidiary of Renault), car manufacturing
- Adria Mobil, camper manufacturer
- Krka, pharmaceuticals

== International relations ==
=== Twin towns – sister cities ===
Novo Mesto is twinned with:

- Langenhagen, Germany
- Vilafranca del Penedès, Spain
- Bihać, Bosnia and Herzegovina
- Yixing, China
- Leskovac, Serbia
- Herceg Novi, Montenegro
- Toruń, Poland
- Trnava, Slovakia

== Notable people ==
Notable people that were born, lived or died in Novo Mesto include:

- Joannes Adamus Gaiger (1667–1722), philologist and lexicographer
- Celestina Ekel (1867–1935), music teacher, organist, and composer
- Albin Gutman (born 1947), general
- Marija Hladnik Berden (1892–1924), teacher, organist and composer
- Božidar Jakac (1899–1989), painter
- Iztok Jarc (born 1963), diplomat and politician
- Barbara Jelić-Ružić (born 1977) and Vesna Jelić (born 1982), Croatian volleyball players
- Rado Lencek (1921–2006), linguist, philologist, writer
- Pino Mlakar (1907–2006), choreographer
- Mira Pintar (1891–1980), artist and art collector
- Silvo Plut (1968–2007), serial killer
- Edvard Ravnikar (1907–1993), architect
- Marija Rus (1921–2019), Romance philologist, professor of French, translator, poet
- Anka Salmič (1902–1969), Slovenian farmer, folk healer and poet
- Ferdinand Seidl (1856–1942), naturalist and geologist
- Damijan Šinigoj (born 1964), writer
- Leon Štukelj (1898–1999), three-time Olympic gold medalist in gymnastics
- Melania Trump (born 1970), First Lady of the United States and the 3rd wife of Donald Trump

== Gallery ==
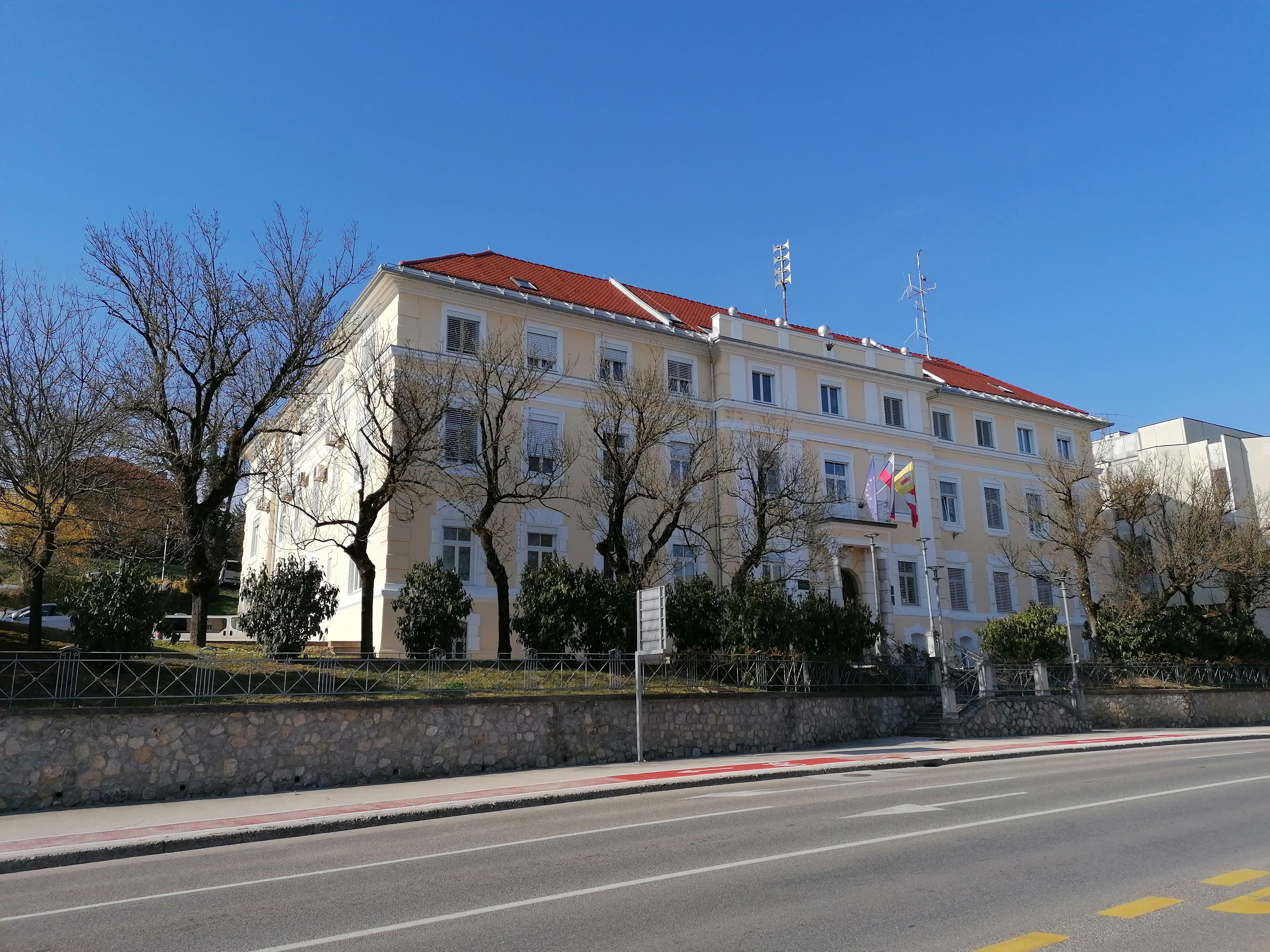
Old Town Hall

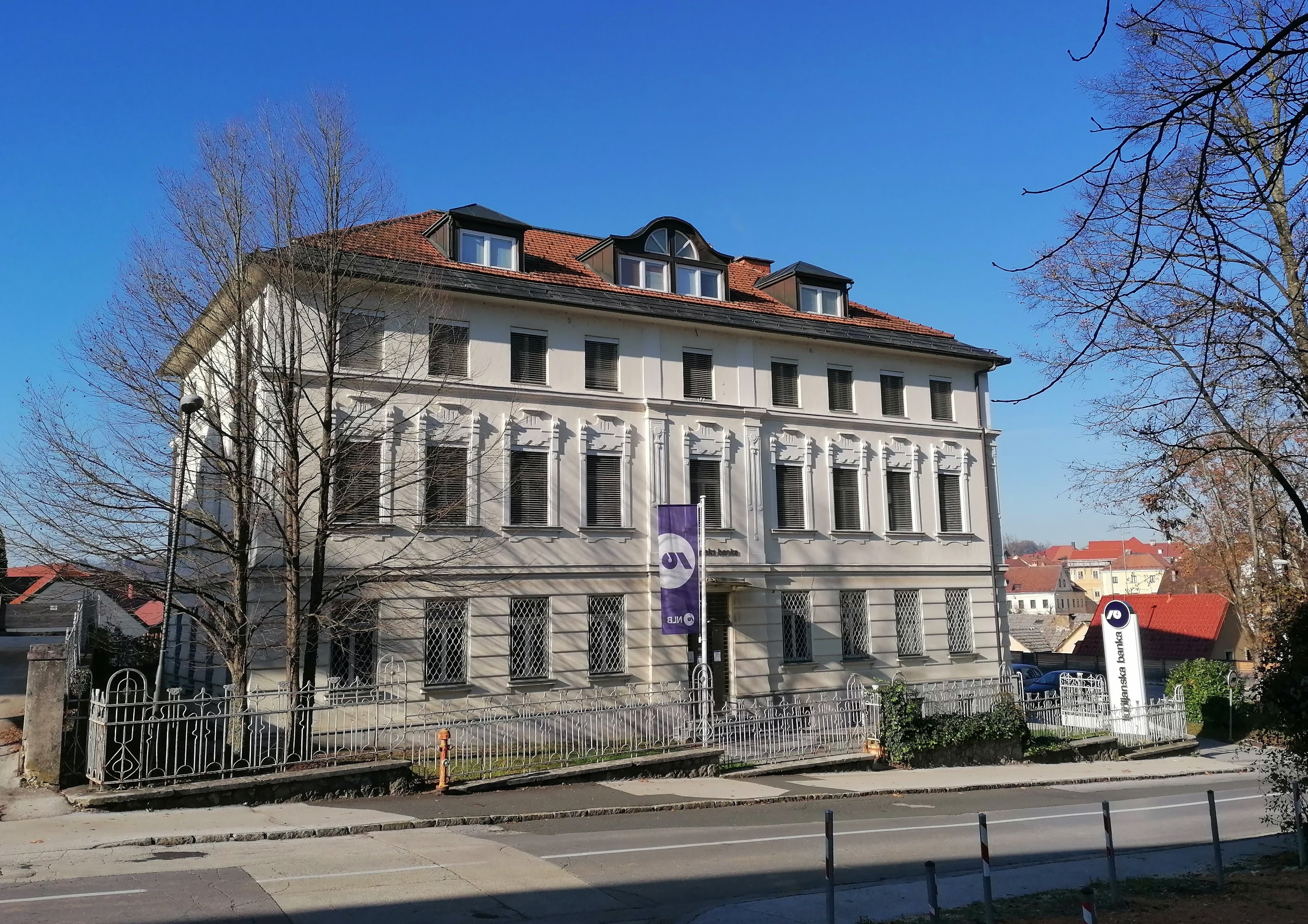
Town Depository

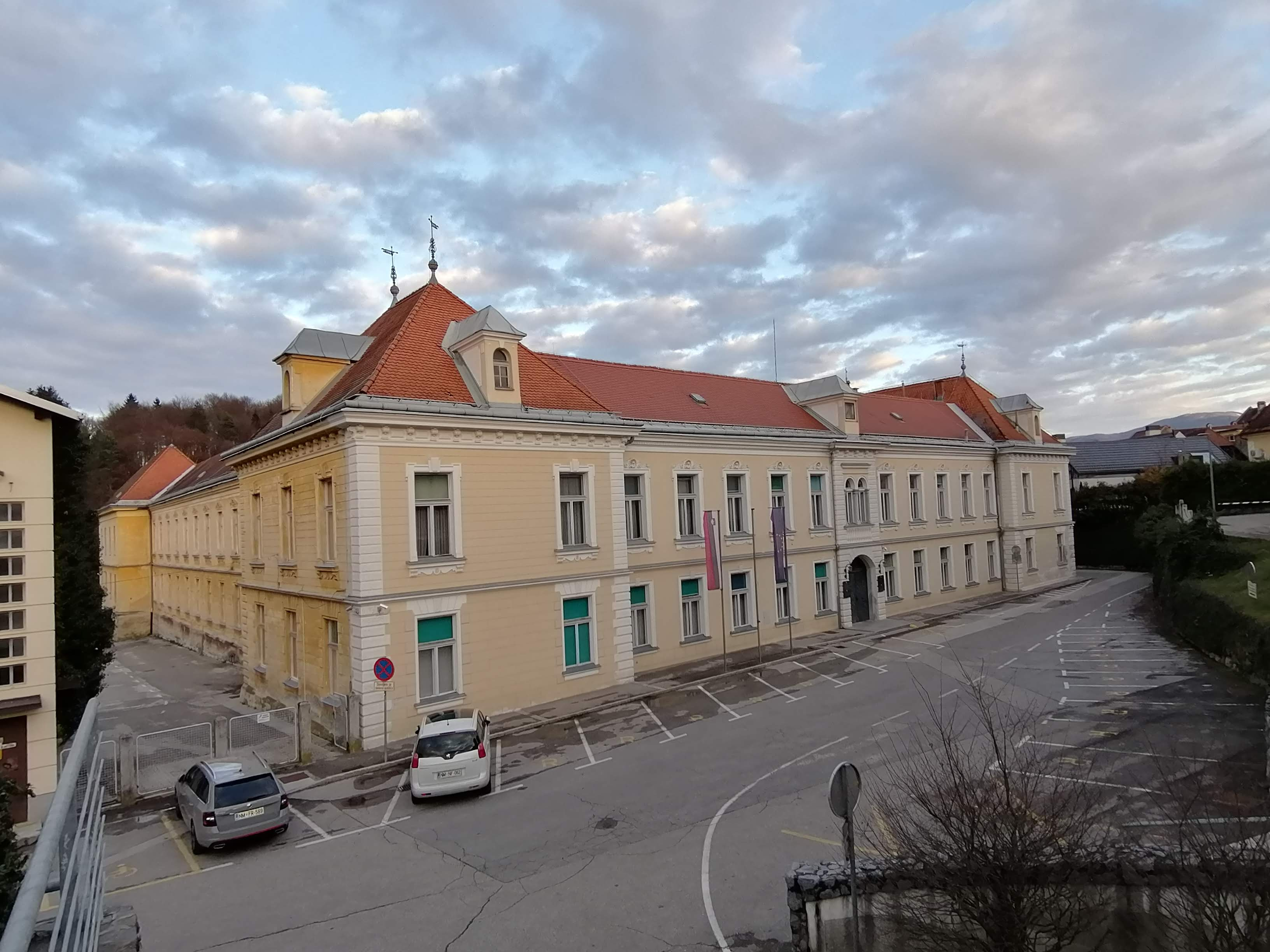
Courthouse

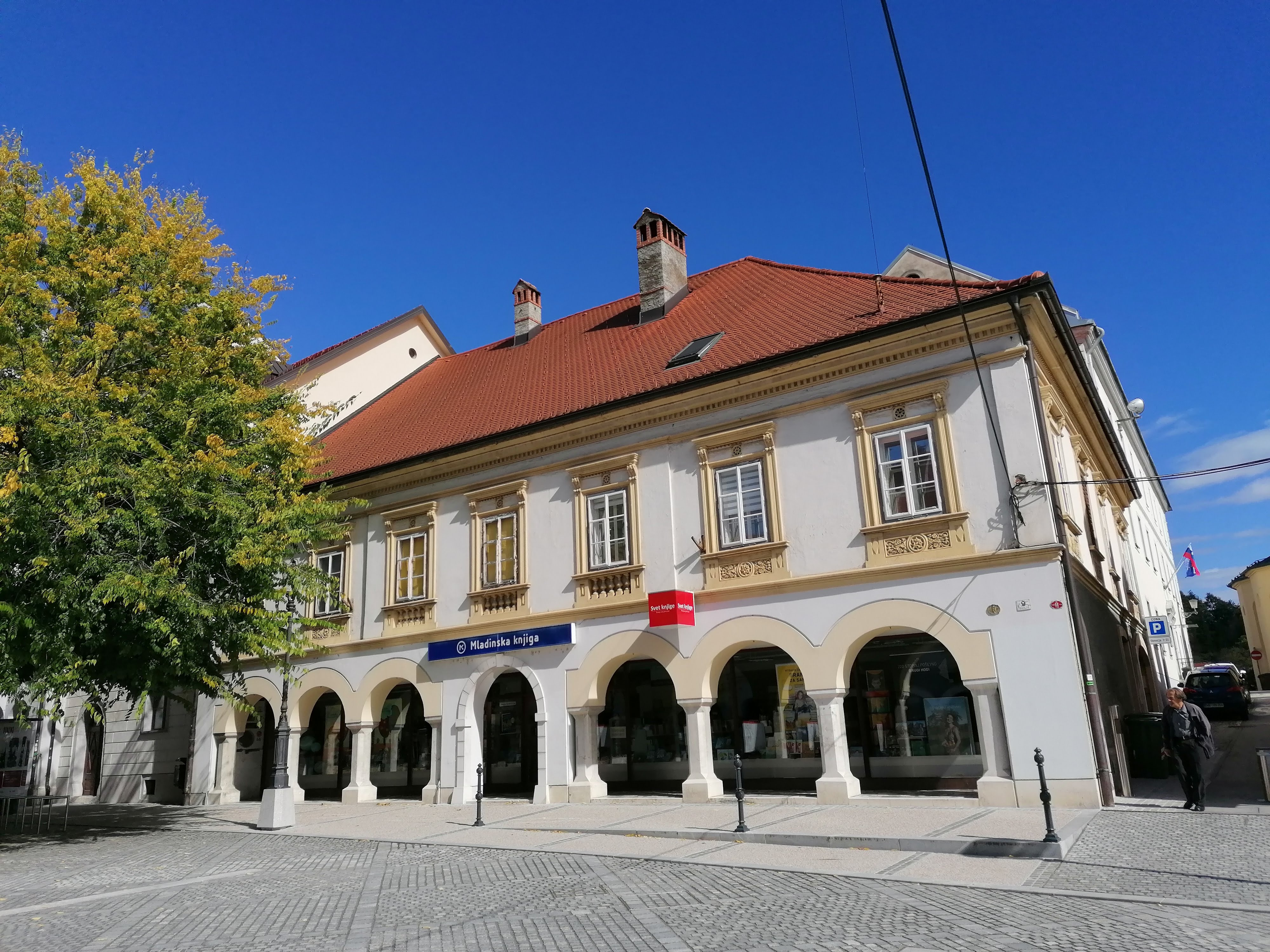
House on Main Square

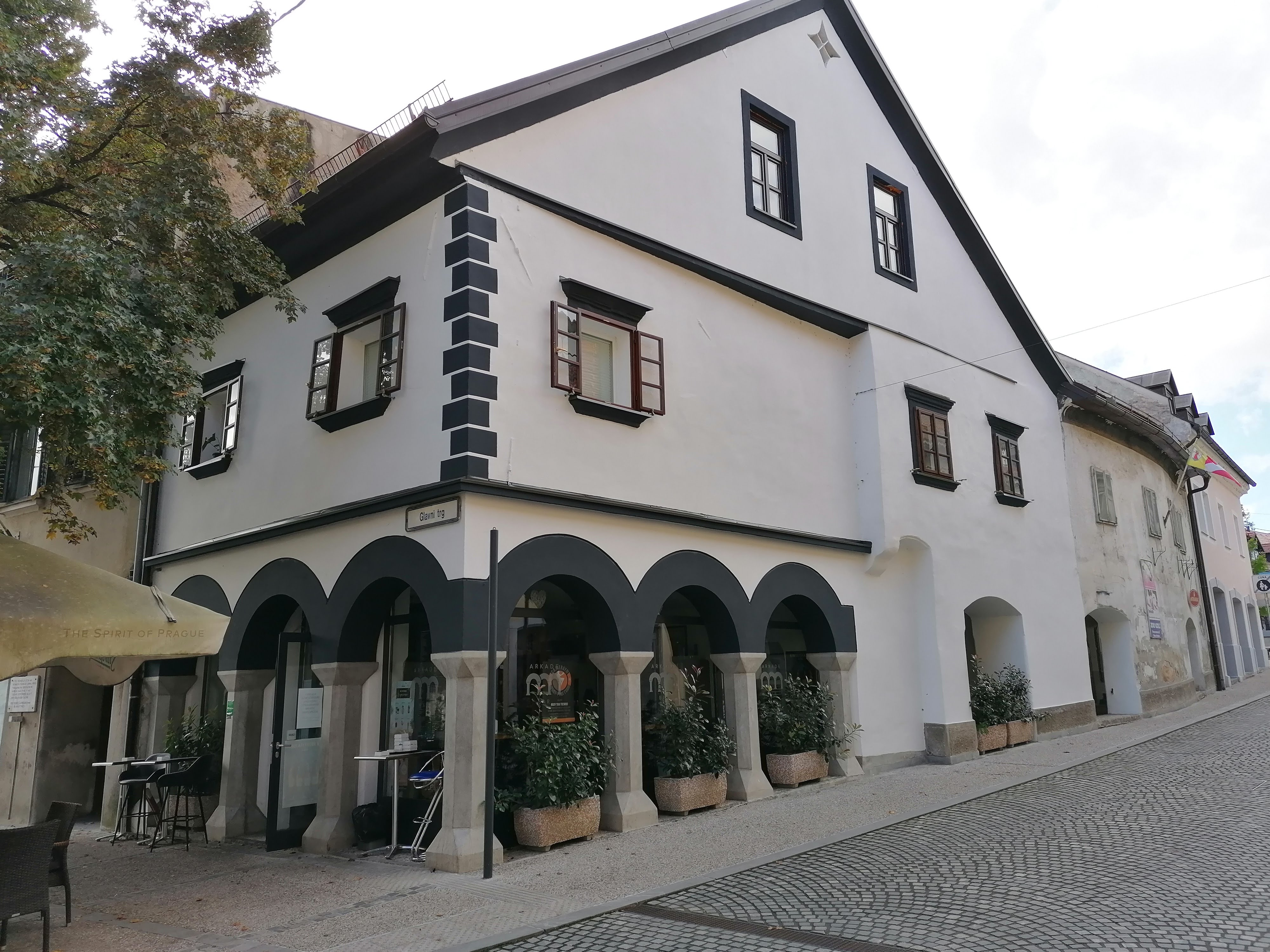
House on Rozman Street

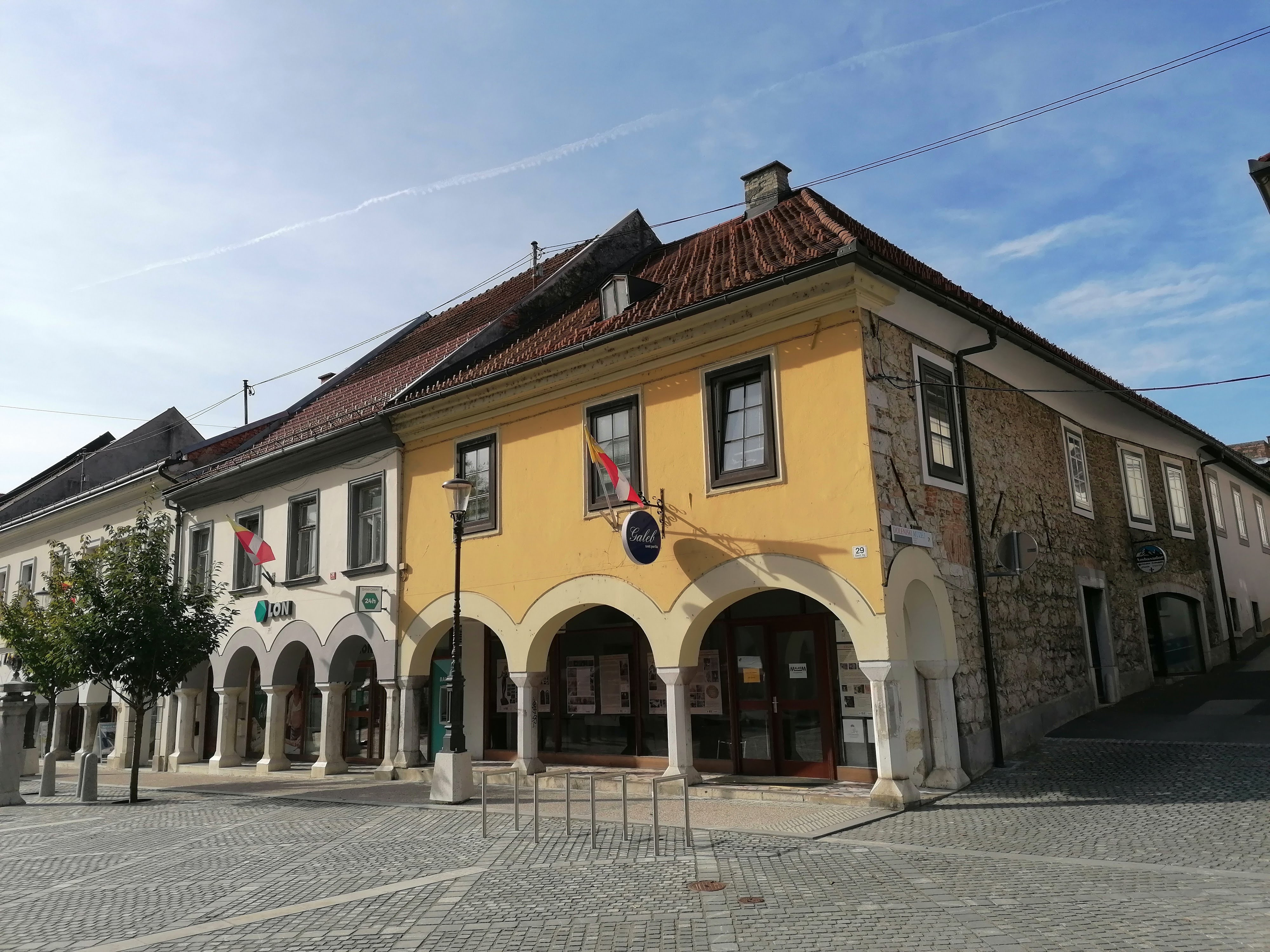
Houses on Main Square

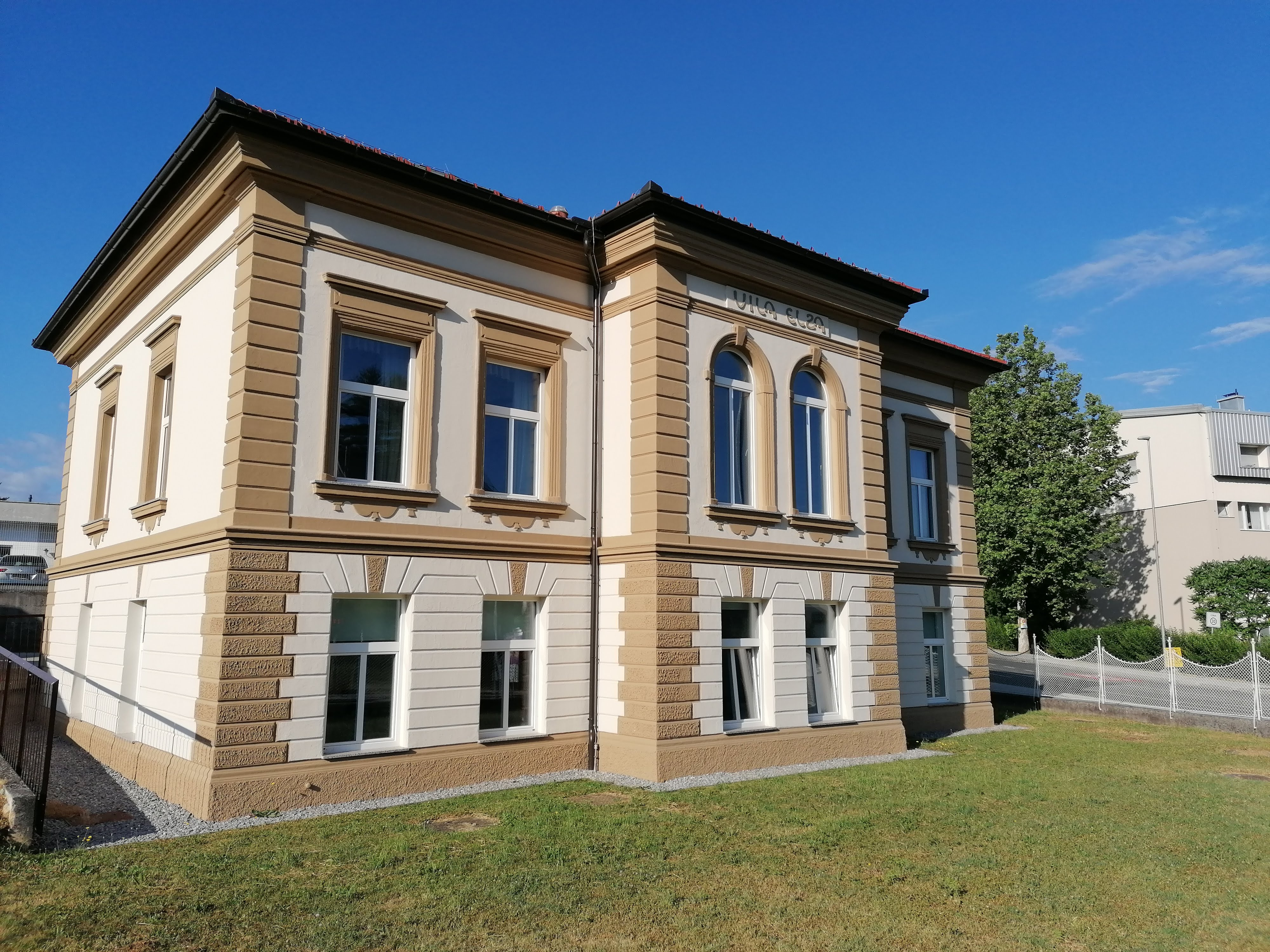
Villa Hadl

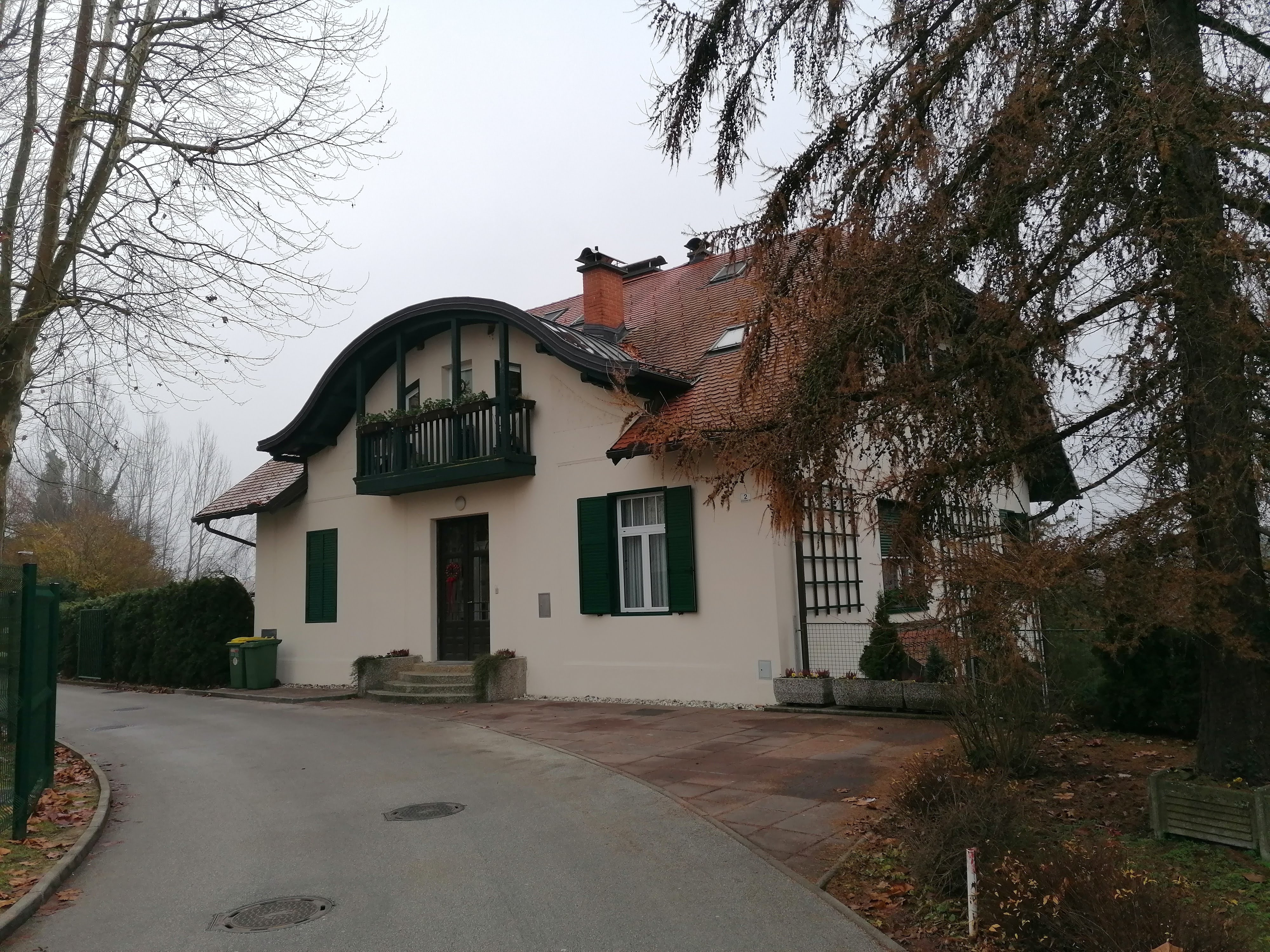
Defranchesi House

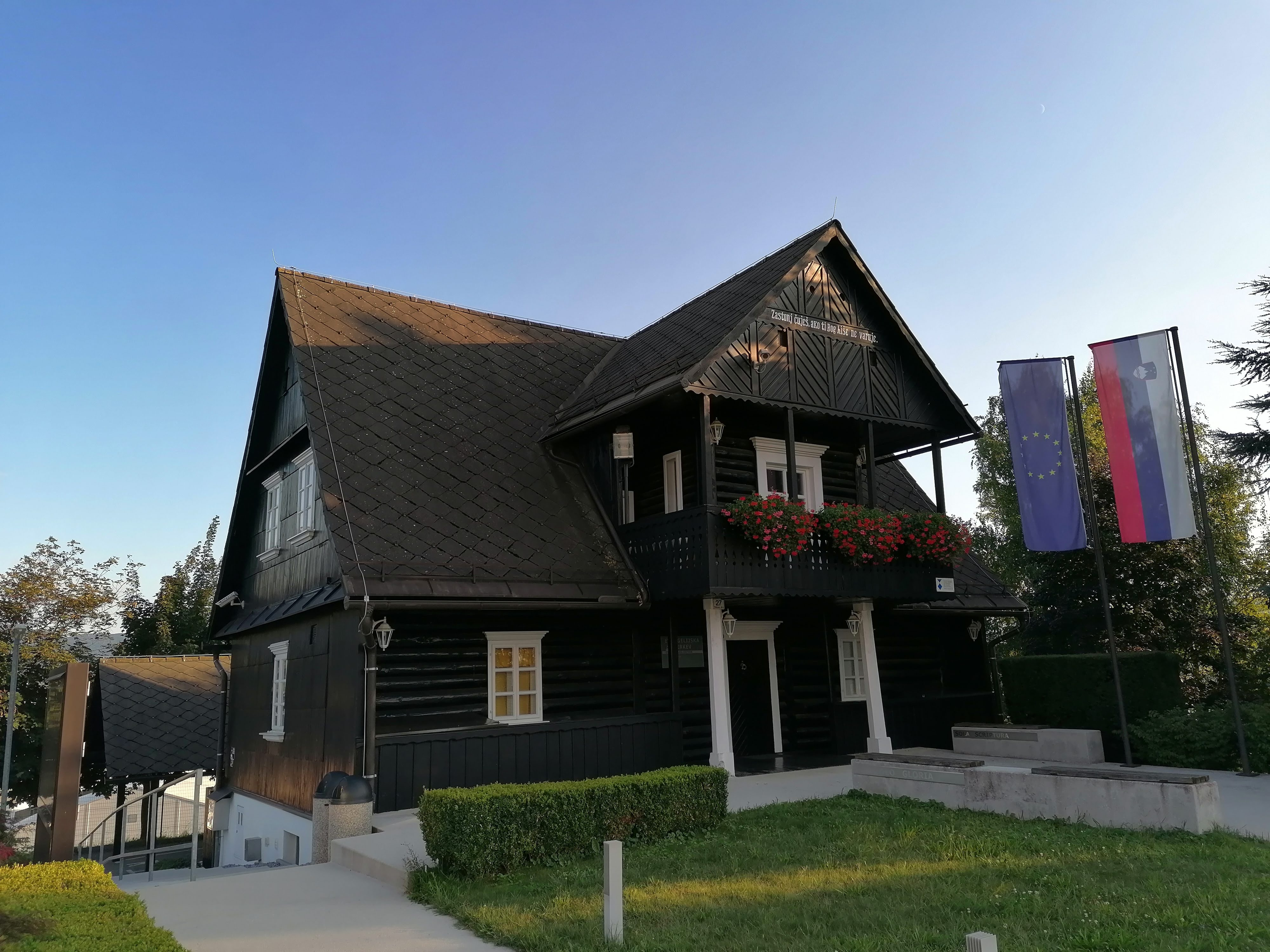
Old Wooden House

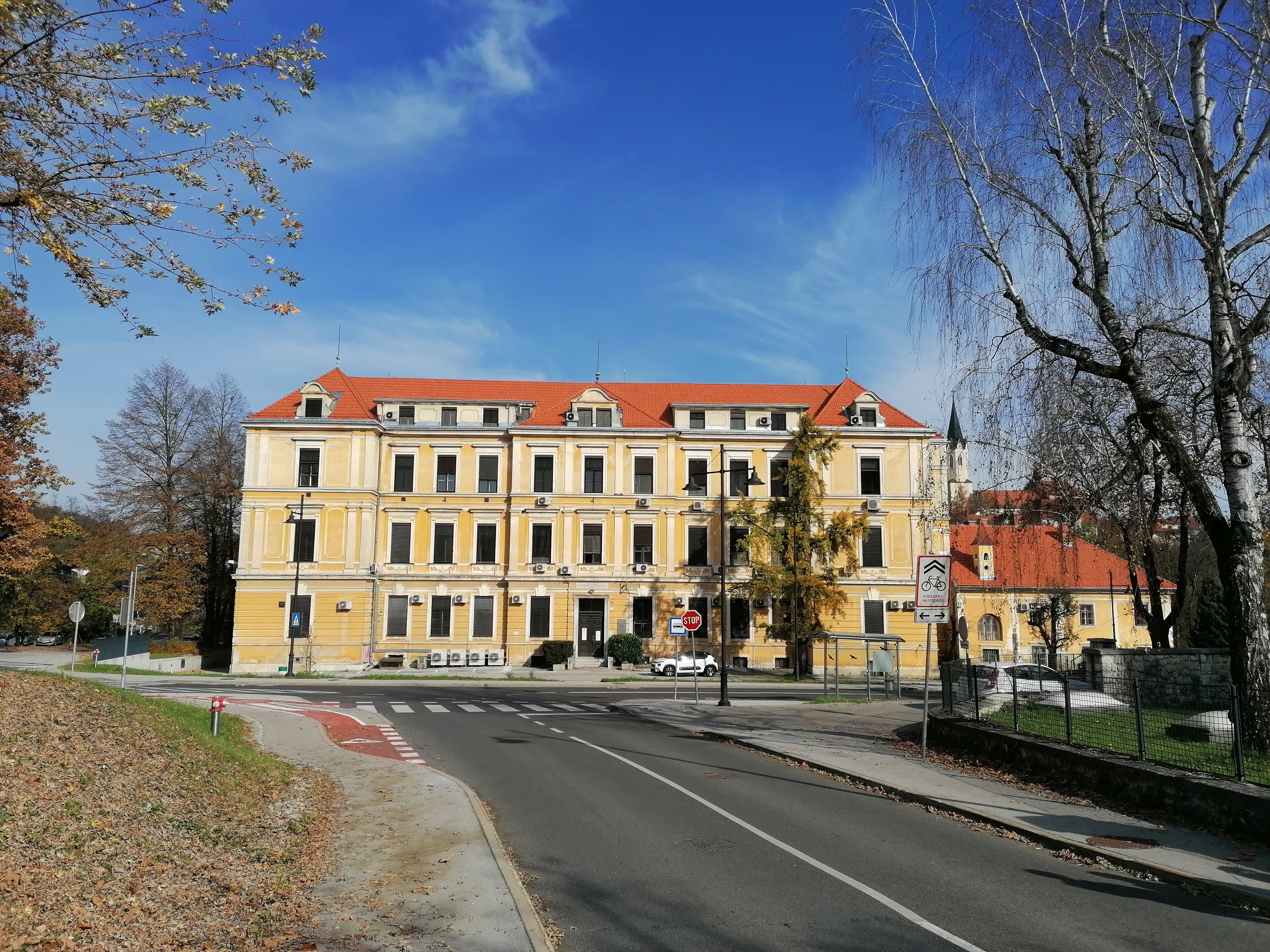
Male Hospital

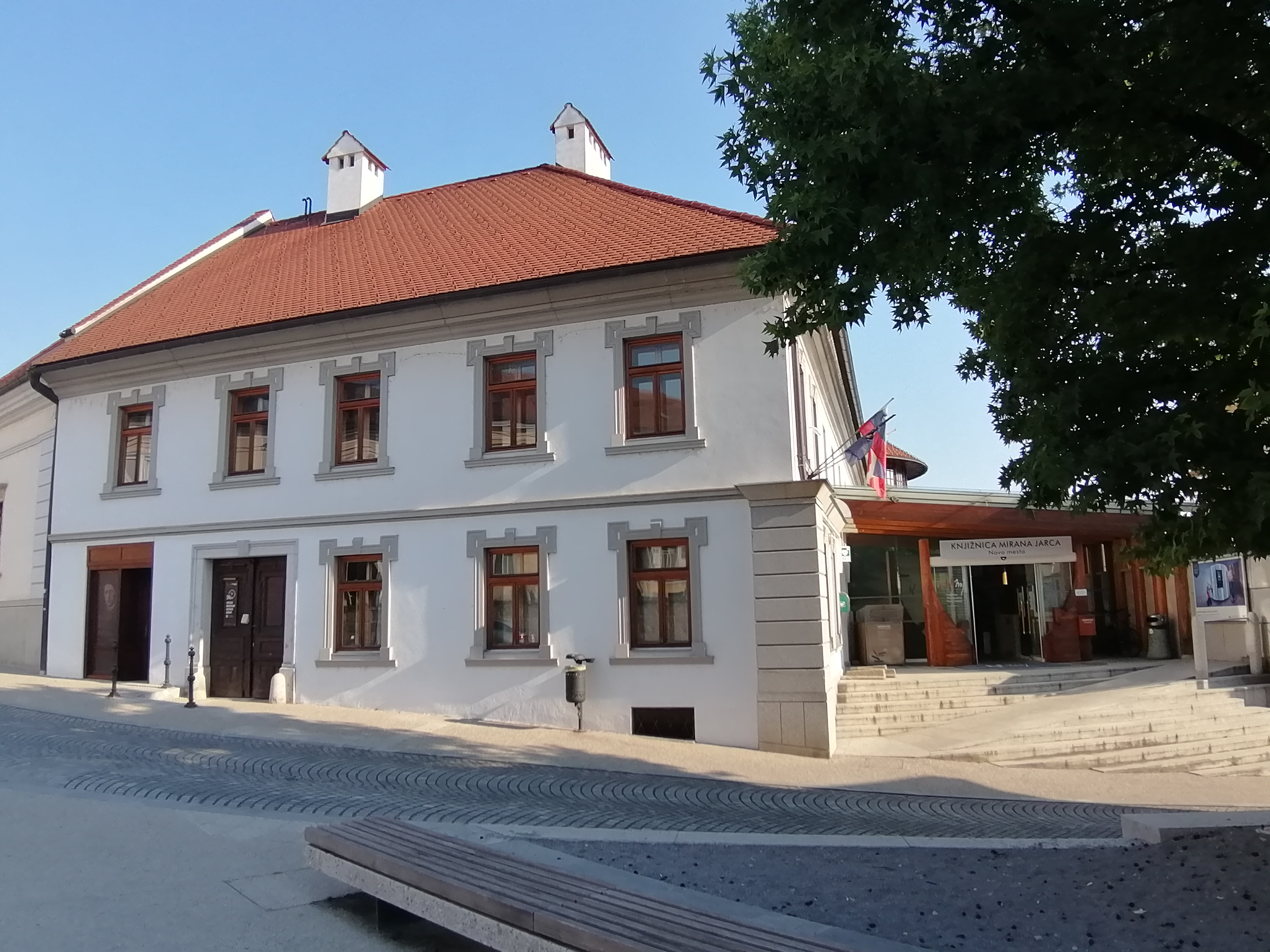
Miran Jarc Library

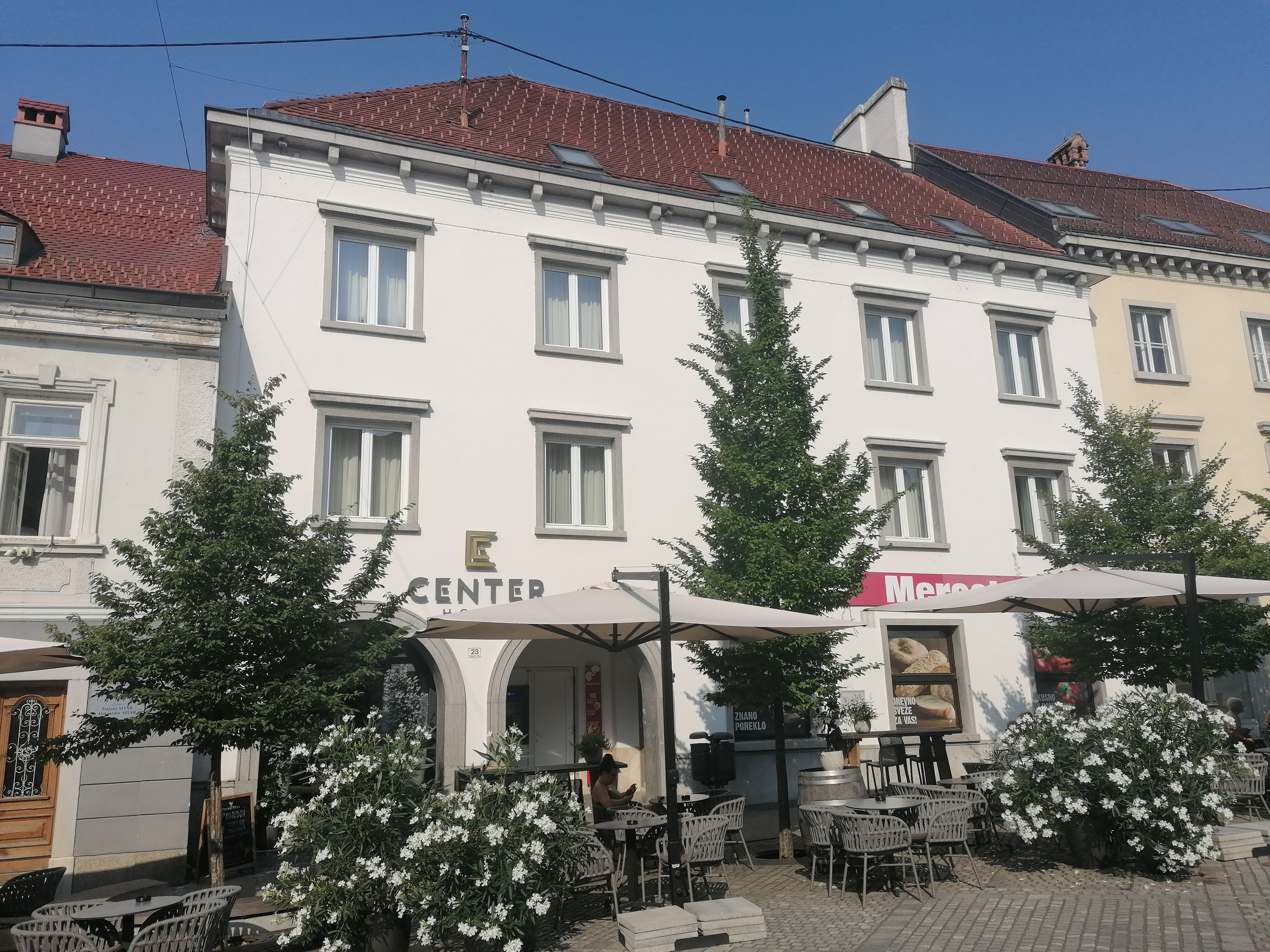
Hotel Center

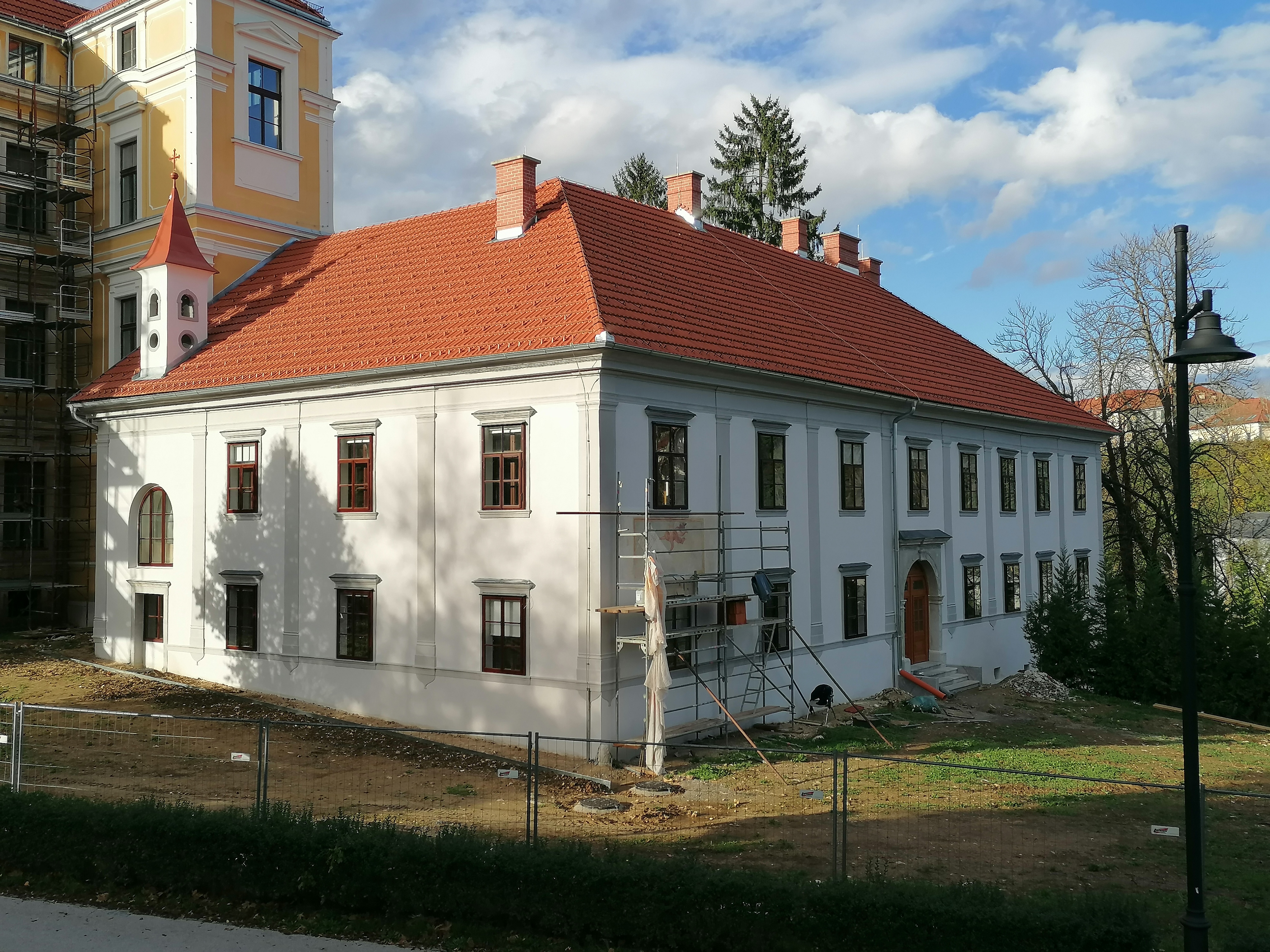
Neuhoff Manor

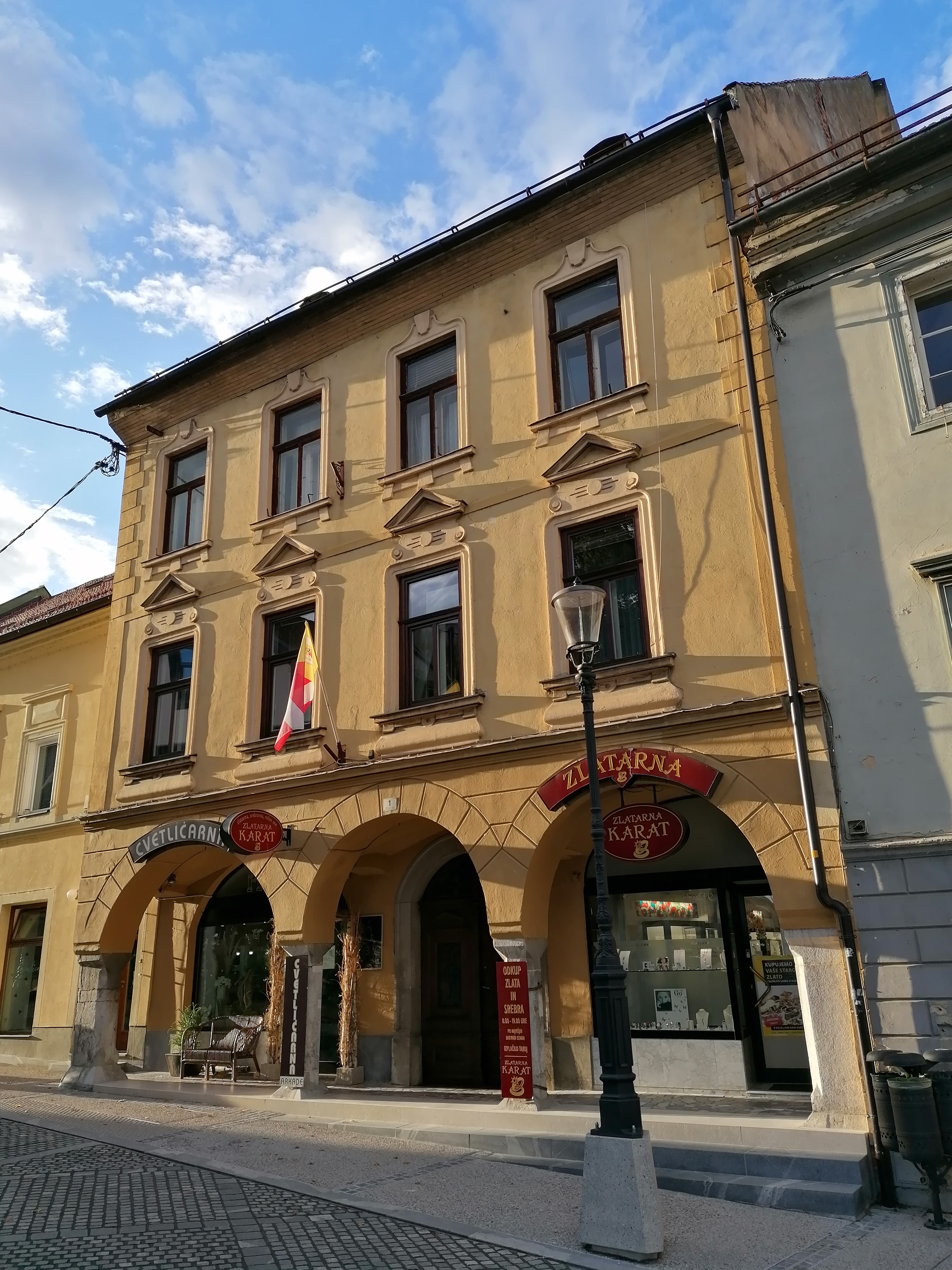
Bergman House

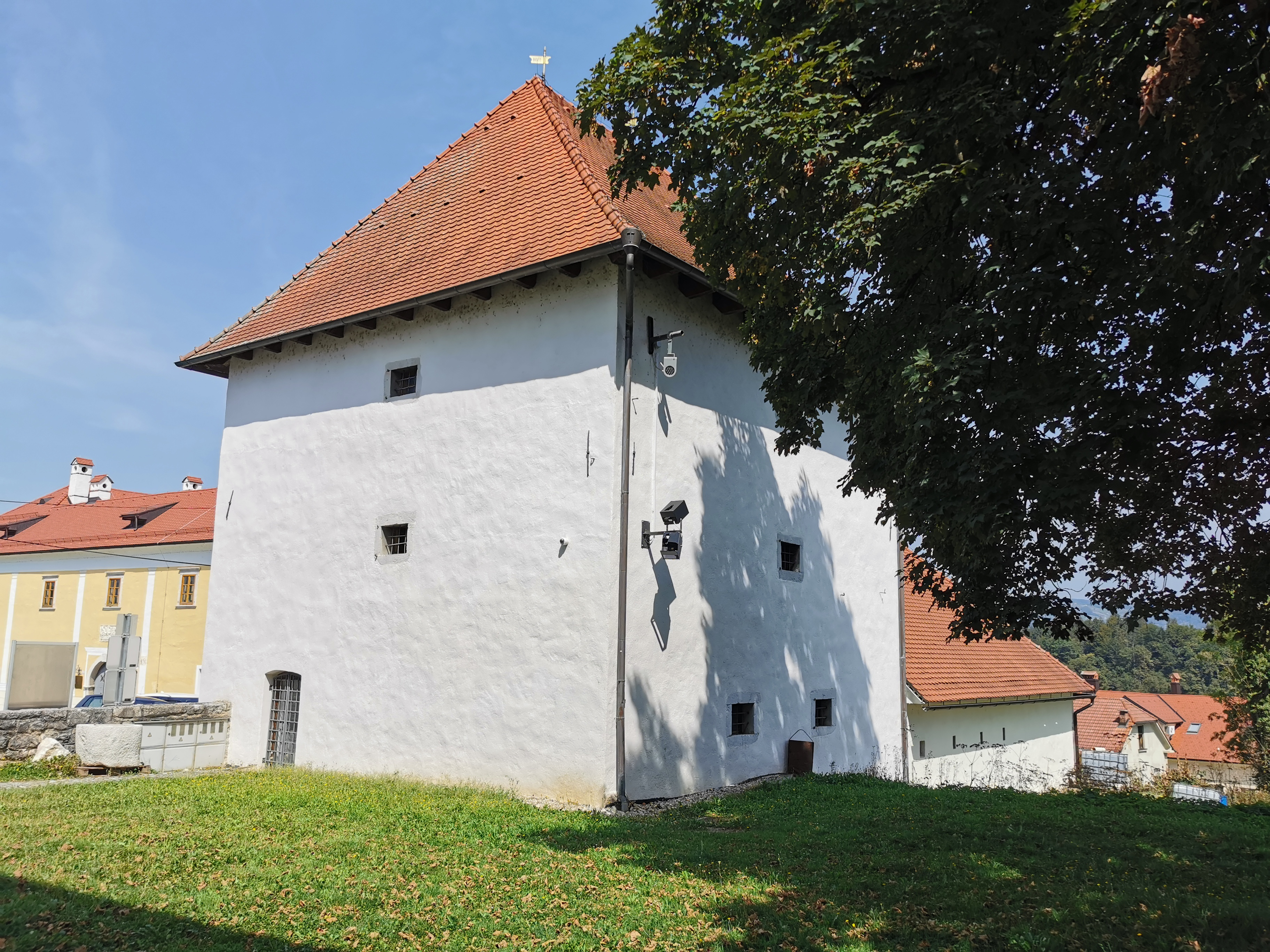
Kapitelj Granary

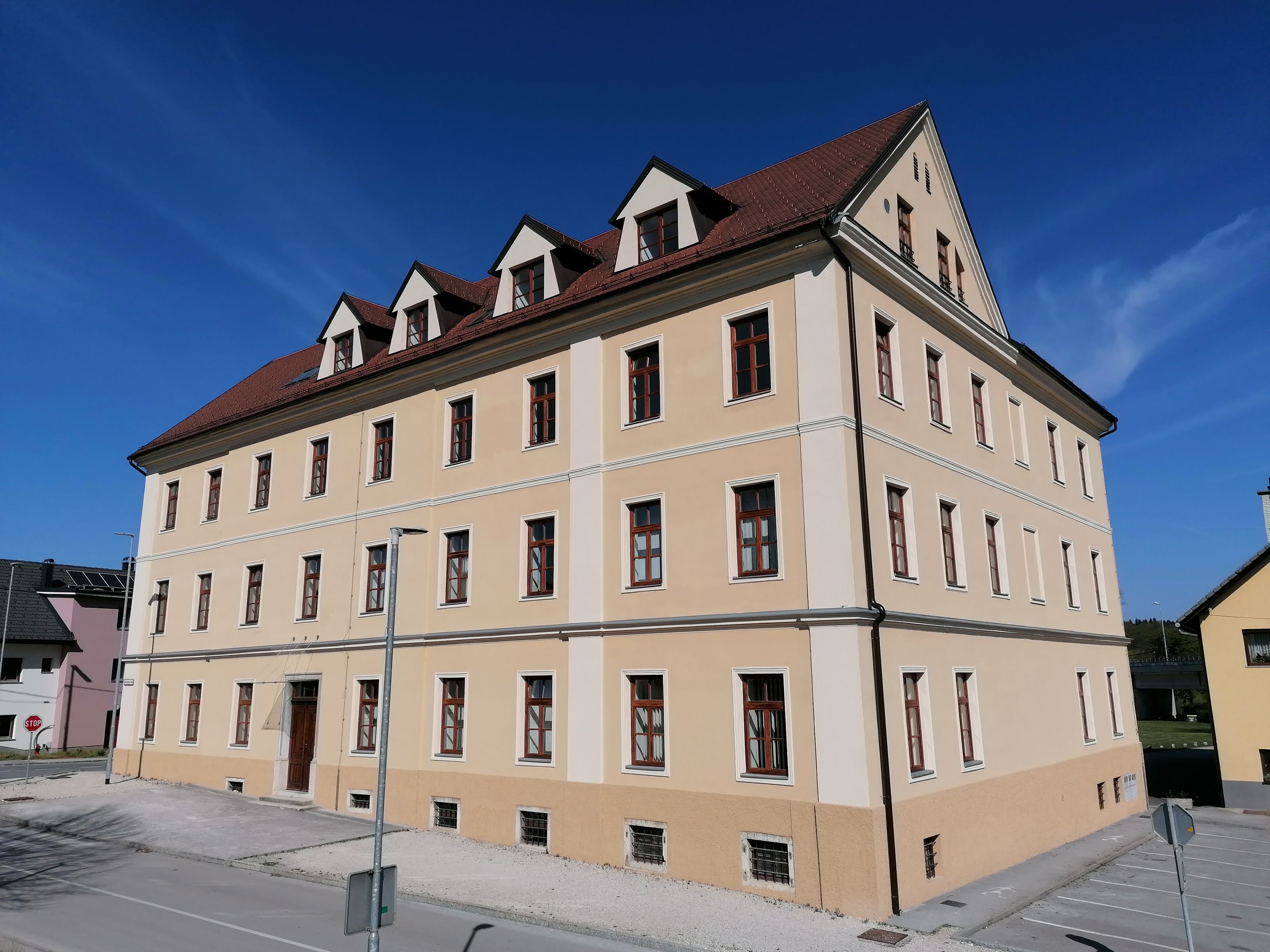
Girls' School

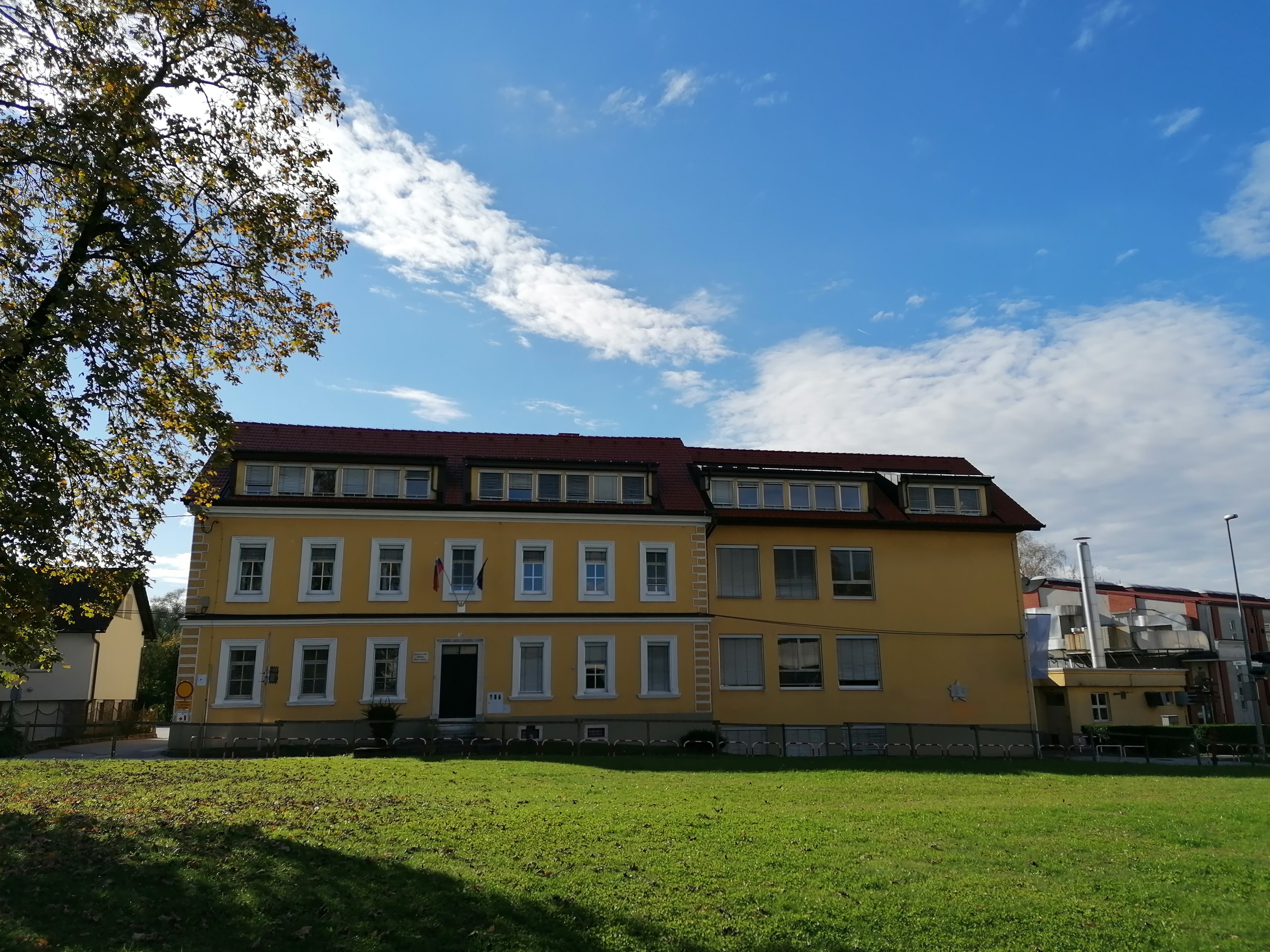
Šmihel Primary School

== See also ==
- Krka Basketball Club
- Langenhagen, a twin city of Novo Mesto
- Novo Mesto Grammar School
