= Rado Lenček =

Rado Ludovik Lenček (3 October 1921 – 27 January 2005) was a Slovene linguist, cultural historian and ethnologist, who lived and worked in the United States. He was a professor emeritus at Columbia University and contributed significantly to the development of Slovene studies in the United States.

== Education and early work ==
Lenček was born in Mirna. He finished grammar school in Novo Mesto in 1940 and then studied Slavic studies at the University of Ljubljana's Faculty of Arts. He graduated in 1944 and in 1946 and 1947 continued his studies in Padua, Italy. After that, he worked for ten years as a professor at different grammar schools in the Allied Military Government administered Zone A of the Free Territory of Trieste. In Trieste, he also edited the Kulturne vesti (Cultural News) newsletter of the United States Information Service.

== Life and work in the United States ==
In 1956, Lenček and his family emigrated to the United States. From 1958 to 1959, he studied at the University of Chicago, after which he enrolled at Harvard University, where he received a doctorate in Slavic languages and literatures in 1962. He then taught Slavic languages and literature at the University of Illinois at Chicago. In 1965, he started teaching at Columbia University in New York, where he remained until his retirement in 1995. From 1975 to 1988, he was the head of the Slavic department. He was also a member of the New York Academy of Sciences and of several linguistic societies in the United States and Europe.

== Awards ==
Lenček was awarded several times for his work, for example the award of the American Association of Teachers of Slavic and Eastern European Languages in 1994, and the title Honorable Ambassador of the Republic of Slovenia in Science, bestowed on him by the Slovenian Ministry of Science and Technology in 1995 for his achievements in research that contributed to raising Slovenia's international profile. In 2001, he was bestowed the Order of Freedom of the Republic of Slovenia by Slovene President Janez Drnovšek for his numerous years of work for raising the profile of and establishing the Slovene language abroad. From 1991 until his death, he was a correspondent member of the Slovenian Academy of Sciences and Arts. The Rado Lencek Graduate Student Prize of the American Association for Slavic, East European, and Eurasian Studies was named after him.
