= Institute of Balkan Studies and Centre of Thracology =

Institute of Balkan Studies and Centre of Thracology Институт за балканистика с център по тракология
- Founder: Bulgarian Academy of Sciences
- Established: 1964; 62 years ago
- Focus: Balkan studies
- Chair: Roumiana Preshlenova
- Location: Moskovska Street 45, Sofia, Bulgaria
- Website: balkanstudies.bg

The Institute of Balkan Studies and Centre of Thracology "Prof. Alexander Fol" (Bulgarian: Институт за балканистика с център по тракология) of the Bulgarian Academy of Sciences is a Bulgarian national research centre and coordinating institution in the field of Balkan studies. The institute is based in the capital of Bulgaria Sofia. Founded in 1964 under UNESCO auspices, the institute was created as a research and educational centre focused on the languages, history, culture, and contemporary developments of the Balkans. The institute is accredited to train PhD students, postdoctoral researchers, and interns in fields such as early modern and modern history, archives and document studies, palaeography, and Balkan literature and culture.

== History ==
The institute was established in 1964 under UNESCO auspices. In 1972, the Institute of Thracology was founded as an independent unit within the Bulgarian Academy of Sciences. Following structural reforms in 2010, it merged with the Institute of Balkan Studies forming the modern day institution.

== See also ==
- Thrace
- Institute for Balkan Studies (Greece)
- Institute for Balkan Studies (Serbia)
- International Association of South-East European Studies
- Imagining the Balkans
