= Greek-Serbian Symposium =

Balkan studies conference

The Greek-Serbian Symposium (Greek: Hellēnoserviko symposio, Serbian: Grčko-srpski simpozijum) is a joint conference on Balkan studies, specialized in Greek-Serbian relations, held by the Greek Institute for Balkan Studies (IMXA) in Thessaloniki and Serbian Institute for Balkan Studies of the Serbian Academy of Sciences and Arts (SANU) in Belgrade, since 1976. The collections of reports from the conferences are published by the institutes. It was agreed after the second symposium that the reports were to be published in world languages.

== Symposiums ==
Symposium	Date	Location	Publications
1st	7–10 November 1976	Kavala	Published in 1979 by IMXA: Cooperation between Greeks and Serbs during their struggles for liberation 1804–1830. Institute for Balkan Studies in Thessaloniki. 1979.
2nd	23–24 May 1980	Belgrade	Published in 1982 by SANU: Samardžić, Radovan, ed. (1982). "Serbian-Greek Cooperation 1830–1908". Special Editions. 14. Belgrade: SANU.
3rd	4-7 October 1982	Thessaloniki	Published in 1983 by IMXA: "The collaboration between Greeks and Serbs from the fifteenth to the nineteenth century". Balkan Studies. 24 (2). 1983.
4th	1985	Belgrade	Published in 1987 by SANU: L'art de Thessalonique et des pays balkaniques et les courants spirituels au XIVe siècle.
5th	9–12 October 1987	Thessaloniki and Volos	Published in 1991 by IMXA: Proceedings of the Fifth Greek-Serbian Symposium. Institute for Balkan Studies in Thessaloniki. 1991.
6th	27–28 March 2003	Thessaloniki	
