= Balkan studies =

Academic field

Balkan studies or Balkanology is the studies of the Balkans and Southeastern Europe. It is also known as Southeast European Studies or South-East European Studies. It is a subfield of European studies.

== Institutions ==
- International Association of South-East European Studies (AIESEE)
- East European and Balkan Institute, Hankuk University of Foreign Studies, South Korea
- Institute for Balkan Studies, Greece
- Institute for Balkan Studies, Serbian Academy of Sciences and Arts, Serbia
- Institute of Balkan Studies and Centre of Thracology, Bulgarian Academy of Sciences and Arts, Bulgaria
- Balkanology Research Center, Academy of Sciences and Arts of Bosnia and Herzegovina, Bosnia and Herzegovina
- Centre for Southeast European Studies, University of Graz, Austria
- Department of Balkan, Slavic and Oriental Studies, University of Macedonia, Greece
- Department of South Slavonic and Balkan Studies, Charles University, Czech Republic
- M. Drynov Center for Bulgarian and Balkan Studies, National University of Kharkiv, Ukraine
- Department of Balkan Studies, Nicolaus Copernicus University in Toruń, Poland

== People ==
- Traian Stoianovich (1921–2005), history
- Gustav Weigand (1860–1930), linguistics
- Gerhard Gesemann (1888–1948), linguistics
- Konstantin Josef Jireček (1854–1918), history, linguistics
- Josef Matl (1897–1974), history, linguistics
- Ioannis Papadrianos (d. 2009), history
- Kristian Sandfeld (1873–1942), linguistics
- Vaso Čubrilović (1897–1990), history
- Radovan Samardžić (1922–1994), history
- Bogdan Petriceicu Hasdeu (1838–1907), linguistics
- Dragoljub Dragojlović (b. 1928), philology, history
- Boris Shmelev (b. 19××), contemporary geo-politics
- Ivan Dorovský (1935–2021), linguistics, Slavistics and Balkanology
- Nicolae Șerban Tanașoca (1941–2017), history and philology
- Maria Todorova
- Irena Natalia Sawicka (1944), linguistics

== See also ==
- Albanology
- Byzantine studies
- Hellenic studies
- Ottoman studies
- Slavic studies
- Yugoslav studies
- Imagining the Balkans
