= Alexandre Kostov =

Bulgarian historian and Balkanist

Prof. Dr. habil., Corresponding member of the Bulgarian Academy of Sciences Alexandre Grigorov Kostov
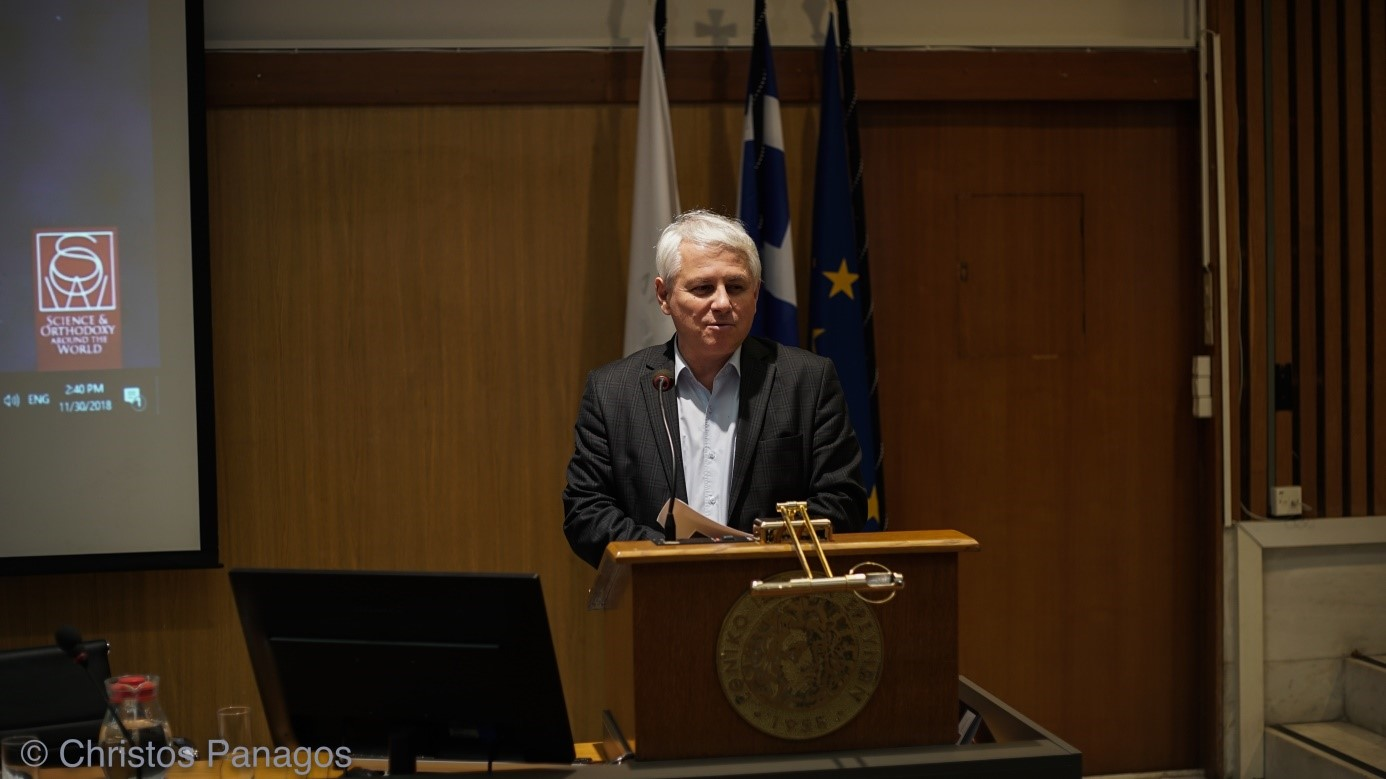
- Born: 11th of February 1956; Sofia, Bulgaria
- Education: Faculty of History, Sofia University "St. Kliment Ohridski"
- Occupations: Professor of Modern and Contemporary History of the Balkans
- Employer(s): Institute of Balkan Studies and Centre of Thracology, BAS
- Awards: Officer in the Order of King Leopold – Belgium (2008); Distinctive badge for services to Bulgarian Academy of Sciences (2016); Cavaliere dell`Ordine della Stella d`Italia (2018); Honorary Badge of the Municipality of Montana (2024)

Alexandre Kostov is a Bulgarian historian, professor of Modern and Contemporary History of the Balkans, and Corresponding Member of the Bulgarian Academy of Sciences since 2018. He is a specialist in Balkan history in the 19th and 20th centuries. He is also involved in contemporary issues. Prof. Kostov works at the Institute of Balkan Studies and Centre of Thracology "Prof. Alexander Fol" at the Bulgarian Academy of Sciences.

== Biography ==
Prof. Kostov was born on 11 February 1956 in Sofia. He got his master's degree from the Sofia University “St. Kliment Ohridski” (1989) and PhD degree from the Bulgarian Academy of Sciences (1989). Since 1984 he is affiliated with the Institute of Balkan Studies at the Bulgarian Academy of Sciences. Between 2010 and 2018 he was director of this research unit – now the Institute of Balkan Studies & Center of Thracology. Professor and Doctor of Sciences since 2014. Corresponding Member of the Bulgarian Academy of Sciences (elected in 2018). Since 2019 he has been the President of the Academic Council of the Institute of Balkan Studies & Center of Thracology. In 2021 he was elected as a member of the Directory Board of Bulgarian Academy of Sciences.

He specialized at the University of Geneva, Maison des Sciences de l’Homme (Paris), Institut für Europäische Geschichte (Mainz - Germany) and was a Mellon Fellow at NIAS (Wassenaar – The Netherlands), visiting professor at the University of Sofia “St. Kliment Ohridski”, European University Institute (Florence - Italy), École des hautes études en sciences sociales (Paris), Universite d’Artois (Arras - France) and Technische Universität (Darmstadt). He has also lectured at the University of Geneva, Harvard University, Capital Normal University (Beijing - China), and other universities.

Since September 2015 Prof. Kostov is the President of the International Association of South East European Studies (AIESEE), founded in 1963 under the auspices of UNESCO. In 2019 he was elected a corresponding member of the International Academy of History of Science founded in 1928.

He is a member of the advisory boards of numerous academic journals in Bulgaria, Romania, and Greece.

Prof. Kostov is the editor of 23 collective publications and the author of more than 150 academic articles and monographs.

In March 2024, Prof. Alexandre Kostov was awarded the Honorary Badge of the Municipality of Montana and became an honorary citizen of Montana.

== Awards ==
- Officer in the Order of King Leopold – Belgium (2008)
- Distinctive badge for services to Bulgarian Academy of Sciences (2016)
- Cavaliere dell`Ordine della Stella d`Italia (2018)
- Honorary Badge of the Municipality of Montana (2024)

== Selected publications ==
- Kostov, A. Economic Relations between Switzerland and the Balkan States (1830-1914). Heron-Press, Sofia, 2001. (in Bulgarian)
- Kostov, A. Bulgaria and Belgium. Economic, political and cultural relations (1879-1914). Sofia, ArtMC, 2004. (in Bulgarian)
- Kostov, A. The development of the relations between Bulgaria and Belgium during the interbellum (1919-1939). Sofia, ArtMC, 2005. (in Bulgarian)
- Kostov, A. From Cold War Rivals to European Union Partners. The Relations between Bulgaria and Belgium from the World War II to Present Day. Sofia, ArtMC, 2007 (in Bulgarian).
- Kostov, A. Continuity, modernization, perspectives. Ten years “Solvay Sodi”, 1997-2007). Sofia, EG Consult, 2007. (in Bulgarian)
- Kostov, A. From Craft to Profession. The Engineering in the Balkans from the Beginning of XVIIIth Century to the First World War. Sofia, Paradigma, 2015. (in Bulgarian)
- Kostov, A. Transport and Communications in the Balkans (1800-1914). Sofia, Sofia University Press, 2017. (in Bulgarian)
