= Institute for Balkan Studies =

Institute for Balkan Studies can refer to:

- Institute for Balkan Studies (Greece)
- Institute for Balkan Studies (Serbia)
