= Dangerous Knowledge =

Dangerous Knowledge may refer to:

- Dangerous Knowledge: a 6-part TV espionage drama for Southern Television, UK, starring John Gregson, and first shown in 1976. Later edited into a TV movie.
- Dangerous Knowledge: Orientalism and Its Discontents, a 2006 book by Robert Graham Irwin
- Dangerous Knowledge, a 2007 documentary by David Malone portraying the work of mathematicians Georg Cantor, Ludwig Boltzmann, Kurt Gödel and Alan Turing
