= Southeast Hunting Groups =

German-collaborationist sabotage groups

Branko Gašparević (in the center, seen from behind) and Anton Schwartz (bareheaded) during sabotage training in Neustrelitz (Austria)

"Southeast Hunting Groups" were German-collaborationist sabotage groups established in late 1944 to carry out sabotage in liberated Serbia. The Germans appointed Draža Mihailović as the leader of these groups, for which purpose he formed the "Royal Commandos Command". The purpose of the sabotage was to prepare the ground for the reoccupation of Belgrade by the Germans in the spring of 1945.

At that time, heavy fighting was taking place on the Syrmian Front between the Wehrmacht and the Yugoslav Partisans. Sabotage and espionage groups, trained by the Gestapo, were sent behind the lines in order to weaken the efforts of the Partisans, which was fighting to drive the occupiers out of Yugoslavia.

In addition to Serbian ones, there were also Romanian, Bulgarian and Greek "Southeast Hunting Groups".

== Formation ==
After being expelled from Serbia, the Germans began preparing the Southeast Hunting Groups, intelligence-terrorist groups composed of Serbs and Germans with the aim of infiltrating Serbia to carry out acts of sabotage and terrorist attacks. When the remnants of Ljotić's Serbian Volunteer Corps and Nedić's Special Police retreated into the Third Reich, the Gestapo immediately ordered the formation of sabotage groups and their dispatch for training in Kaiserwald and Neustrelitz. By the end of 1944, around five terrorist groups had been formed and trained, each numbering between ten and forty men. One of these groups was led by the notorious Boško Bećarević, while the leaders of the others were prominent Ljotićists and Gestapo agents Ratko Parežanin, Jovan Kraguljac, Rade Pavlović "Ognjen" and Branko Gašparević "Gara".

== Operations ==
For the successful execution of operations, they established contact with General Draža Mihailović, who was then in Bosnia. On 13 January 1945, Colonel Gojko Borota (pseudonym "Momblan") reported to Mihailović from Sarajevo about their arrival:

Command No. 11 is placing at our disposal a group of 64 saboteurs, under the command of "Gara". They are equipped with one larger and three smaller radio stations. They are excellently armed and equipped. 29 of them have already arrived in Sarajevo. They have completed special courses. All are Serbs. Gara sends word that he is placing himself completely at the disposal of our organization and accepts all our directives. Gara says that he has specialist instructors, so if we wish to train a larger number of our personnel, he is placing the instructors at our disposal. Gara wants an urgent meeting with me. I request urgent instructions regarding this. Number 11 is urging that one liaison officer with a telegraphist be assigned to them.

— Telegram from Colonel Gojko Borota to General Mihailović dated 13 January 1945.

On 16 January, Colonel Borota informed General Mihailović that he had met with Gašparević and "Number 11", i.e. the Germans:

On the 13th and 14th I had a meeting with Number 11 and Gora. Gora is Gašparević M. Branko, originally from Syrmia. He refers to Piletić and Žika Lazović, who can provide information about him. His group was formed by the Serbian government for infiltration into Serbia. He completed the course in Germany. Number 11 has assigned him the area of Čačak, Užice, Priboj, as well as instructions for the formation of such groups in the field itself. He wishes to serve Serbian interests and to have his own superior, as well as to receive full support from us and to come into contact with you before departing for the field.

Number 11 intends to penetrate through Vlasenica into Zvornik... It intends to clear the communications line Doboj - Tuzla - Zvornik and wants our participation, which would be to the left and right of this line, and the occupation of the cleared territory. They intend to penetrate as far as Belgrade in the spring, and until then sabotage operations are to be carried out by units which they would equip. Such activity is envisaged for a period of one to two months, after which larger-scale operations would take place.

On the same day, Colonel Borota (pseudonym "Maus") sent General Mihailović additional information about Gašparević's sabotage group:

Gara's group is 64 men strong. So far, half are in Sarajevo. They are excellently armed, almost exclusively with automatic weapons. They are normally equipped with explosives and sabotage material and have 4 radio stations. The group consists entirely of Serbs, mostly Lika and Kordun Serbs, with only a few from Serbia. They would be supplied by Number 11. There is one officer from Number 11 with him as a liaison. He does not possess a horse transport unit, which is unnecessary as soon as he enters the field.

On 3 March 1945, Lieutenant Colonel Dragoslav Račić signed an order dispatching Gašparević to Serbia. Račić requested that the Chetniks in the territory through which the group would travel assist Gašparević in carrying out his "special task":

For Captain 2nd Class Branko M. Gašparević — Gara — pursuant to the order of the Supreme Command, he is being dispatched to Serbia on a special task.

He is departing on __ March 1945. He is taking an armed group of men with him.

I request and order all armed groups of our organization and the entire population of Podrinje and other parts of Serbia not to cause him any hindrance, but rather to give him every attention and assistance. He is completely sound nationally and a great national fighter.

According to the dispatch he received from Major Nikola Kalabić, commander of the Mountain Guard of the JVuO, on 8 March 1945, Branko Gašparević left the Supreme Command on the same day. He also had a dispatch issued by the commander of the Avala Corps.

After staying with Mihailović and making joint preparations for two months, the leader of one sabotage group sent a report to his command. On 5th March 1945, he reported to General Edmund Glaise-Horstenau:

As part of the preparations for an operation in Serbian territory by a group formed for this task, its liaison officer (probably Branko Gašparević, note) had the opportunity to speak with D.M. [Draža Mihailović]. The talks were conducted in a very friendly atmosphere; D.M. considers the action plan useful for his own objective – the struggle against communism – and therefore promised every possible support. D.M. presented his action plan, which consists of simultaneously strengthening his forces in western Bosnia and increasing activities in Serbia, so that, at a favorable moment, an uprising and incursion into Serbia could be carried out. D.M. considers it expedient and proposes that his action be carried out simultaneously with the expected German advance into the Balkans, with the proviso that inner Serbia (without Vojvodina and southern Serbia) would be completely left to his units. He considers that the situation regarding possible cooperation has changed significantly, since the Third Reich, as occupier, has been replaced by a common enemy, the communists, and the struggle against them is in the interests of both sides. He therefore advocates cooperation, insofar as it concerns Serbia.

Regarding the tasks and training of his espionage-terrorist group, its leader Gašparević "Gara" stated during the investigation in 1945:

The groups were founded on the principle of rear-area sabotage operations, but in such a way that, simultaneously with carrying out various acts of sabotage and surprise attacks on weaker enemy units, they would also conduct underground propaganda and organize nationally oriented citizens and peasants into a unified front of national resistance. To achieve this, it is necessary to ideologically educate all members of the group so that upon arriving in the field each member can act completely independently. To create a cell of 3 members, whom he would politically and militarily educate and train to such an extent that each of them could subsequently create such a cell of three members on their own, and so on. Analogously, immediately upon arriving in the field, our groups would be broken up into groups of three, which would begin working on the creation of new cells. Only two groups of three and the central radio station should remain with the group commander. ... From all reports received, the commanders would take the most important information for their own report, which they would send via the main radio station to their superiors, specifically in my case to Draža Mihailović's Supreme Command and Mandl.

Gašparević's group was called Ringelnater, which translated means 'grass snake'. Of the 64 men he had when he arrived in Sarajevo, many deserted or fell ill, so the group was filled out with Chetniks. Draža Mihailović assigned 30 men to the group, headed by Lieutenant Milovan Nedeljković. Six more Chetniks from the Mountain Guard went with them. Draža instructed them to conduct anti-Yugoslav propaganda:

Propagate that Tito mobilizes only Serbs and sends them to Hungary to die, while he protects Muslims and Catholics.

The transfer into Serbia did not proceed according to plan, and Gašparević complained that the population did not accept them:

The situation was difficult. The people did not readily accept us, and we ourselves had to avoid the villages so as not to be discovered.

Gašparević's group was captured by units of the Partisans in April 1945. A similar fate befell the head of all the espionage-terrorist groups, Rade Pavlović "Ognjen", who in early spring 1945 parachuted from an aircraft onto Kopaonik with a group dressed in British uniforms and well armed and equipped with a radio station and espionage-sabotage material. Thus, the plan of the "Southeast Hunting Groups Command", headed by the Gestapo agent Mandl, to infiltrate espionage-terrorist groups into Serbia suffered complete failure right at the outset.

== Trials ==
Branko Gašparević, leader of the German-collaborationist sabotage group Ringelnater, was sentenced to death and executed by the Higher Military Court of the JA in August 1945.

General Dragoljub Mihailović was captured in 1946. At the Belgeade Trials, he was also charged with establishing terrorist groups with the assistance of the Gestapo.

[[Datoteka:Draža pred sudom.jpg|mini|right|Defendant Dragoljub Mihailović before the court in Belgrade 1946.]]

President: Who, then, connected you with Gašparević?
Defendant: Borota.
President: Does that mean that the Germans directed Gašparević to Borota?
Defendant: Certainly.
President: Was Borota under your command?
Defendant: Yes.
President: What were the orders given to Gašparević's group?
Defendant: I did not see them, he told me about it at the time, and I was too busy; he said that he had two silent rifles, and that he had tested them on two Ustashe.
President: Did he have explosives?
Defendant: He had a lot of material.
President: What uniforms did Gašparević's group have?
Defendant: They had English and German uniforms.
President: Why did Gašparević's group wear English uniforms?
Defendant: So that they could pass through Serbia more easily, so that they would be better received by the people.

During the interrogation, defendant Mihailović admitted that he maintained contact with these groups:

President: Did you maintain contact with these groups?
Defendant: Perhaps there was contact.
President: Yes or no?
Defendant: Yes.
President: How?
Defendant: By radio.

In the end, it was established that he was their supreme commander:

President: If Gašparević was tasked with sabotage, acts of sabotage and assassinations of leaders, does that mean that he could not do all these things without orders from Topalović?
Defendant: Without orders from Topalović he could not do anything.
President: Under whose command was Topalović?
Defendant: Under the command of the commandos.
President: And who was the commander of the commandos?
Defendant: Colonel Pavlović.
President: And who was Pavlović's commander?
Defendant: I was.

The verdict against General Mihailović established:

After he had been politically and militarily defeated, he organized terrorist groups with the assistance of the Gestapo, then sent them to carry out acts of sabotage, sabotage and assassinations, in order to endanger the new constitutional order in the Federal People's Republic of Yugoslavia.

— Verdict against Dragoljub Mihailović and others

Before the expulsion of the Germans from Yugoslavia and the destruction of the Chetnik units, Mihailović turned to terrorism. In March 1945, in Modriča, Bosnia, he established a school for terrorists, whom he named "royal commandos", and accepted the terrorist sabotage group of Gašparević, which he knew had been sent to Serbia from the Gestapo in Vienna for the purpose of carrying out sabotage, acts of sabotage and assassinations, placed it under his command, assigned it a task and sent it to Serbia with its commander Topalović. He ordered the other commanders to also resort to terrorist actions, and some commanders, after the cessation of military operations, blew up bridges and trains and carried out assassinations until they were captured.

— Verdict against Dragoljub Mihailović and others

== Literature ==
- Radanović, Milan (2016). Kazna i zločin. Snage kolaboracije u Srbiji: odgovornost za ratne zločine (1941-1944) i vojni gubici (1944-1945) (in Serbian). Rosa Luxemburg Stiftung Southeast Europe, Belgrade.

== See also ==
- Syrmian Front
- Branko Gašparević, the commander of one of these groups.
