= Irena Natalia Sawicka =

Polish linguist

Irena Natalia Sawicka (born 20 September 1944, in Warsaw) is a Polish linguist, Balkanologist, and Slavicist with significant interest in Albanology. She is among the world's most authoritative linguists who have studied the Albanian language and has greatly contributed to the dissemination, cultivation, and study of Albanian in Poland, as well as the promotion of Albanology worldwide.

== Education ==
In 1968, she graduated with a degree in Slavic philology from the University of Warsaw. After her studies, she began working at the Institute of Slavic Studies of the Polish Academy of Sciences. In 1972, she obtained her doctoral degree with a dissertation on the structure of consonant clusters in Slavic languages, under the supervision of Janusz Siatkowski. In 1978, she obtained her habilitation degree at the University of Warsaw with a dissertation titled "Issues of Nominal Predication on the Example of the Serbo-Croatian Language." In 1991, she was awarded the title of professor of humanities.

== University professor ==
She worked at the Institute of Slavic Studies until 1992, after which she was employed in the Department of Comparative Slavic Studies at Nicolaus Copernicus University in Toruń, where she directed the Institute of Slavic Philology and Balkan Studies for many years. Within this university, she also taught Albanian, qualifying some of today's most distinguished Polish Balkanists in Albanology. She retired in 2014.

== Fields of specialization ==
Sawicka specializes in the phonetics and phonology of Slavic and Balkan languages, including Albanian, as well as typology and geographical linguistics, with a special focus on Southern Slavic languages and Albanian. She is the author of many pioneering works on the grammar and inflection of the Albanian language in Poland. Among her most important studies on Albanian are those on the structure of the syllable in the Albanian language and the syllable structure of the Arbëreshë of Italy. These are included in the monograph "The Structure of the Albanian Syllable," co-authored with her former student Karolina Dargiel, published in 2018 by the Academy of Sciences and Arts of Kosovo.

== Participation in conferences and awards ==
She has participated in the Prishtina Albanological Seminar and in various Albanology conferences in Kosovo. In 1989, she received the award of the Secretary General of the Polish Academy of Sciences, several times the Rector's Award of Nicolaus Copernicus University in Torun, as well as the "Goce Delčev" Award from the Republic of Macedonia and the "Blaže Koneski" Award from the Macedonian Academy of Sciences for her contributions to Macedonian. She is also a member of the Academy of Sciences and Arts of Kosovo.

== Selected publications ==
- "The Structure of the Syllable in Balkan Languages" (1987)
- "The Phonology of Standard Macedonian" (1991)
- "The Contrastive Phonology of Polish and Serbo-Croatian" (1988)
- "The Phonological Features of the Balkan Linguistic Union" (1997)
- "The Palatals of Slavic Languages" (1999)
- "The Paradigms of Albanian Inflection" (2005)
- "Polish Albanology" (2007)
- "The Structure of the Albanian Syllable" (co-authored with Karolina Dargiel), 2018
