= Orientalism (book) =

1978 book by Edward Said

- Cover of the first edition, showing part of The Snake Charmer (1880), an Orientalist painting by Jean-Léon Gérôme (1824–1904) currently held at the Clark Art Institute
- Author: Edward W. Saïd
- Language: English
- Subject: Orientalism
- Publisher: Pantheon Books
- Publication date: 1978
- Publication place: United States
- Media type: Print (Hardcover and Paperback)
- Pages: 368
- ISBN: 978-0-394-42814-7
- Dewey Decimal: 950/.07/2
- LC Class: DS12 .S24 1979

Orientalism is a 1978 book by Edward Said, in which he establishes the term Orientalism as a critical concept to describe the Western world's commonly contemptuous depiction and portrayal of the Eastern world (or, the Orient). Societies and peoples of the Orient are those who inhabit regions throughout Asia and North Africa. Said argues that Orientalism, in the sense of Western scholarship about the Eastern world, is inextricably tied to the imperialist societies that produced it, which makes much Orientalist work inherently political and servile to power.

According to Said, in the Middle East, the social, economic, and cultural practices of the ruling Arab elites indicate they are imperial satraps who have internalized a romanticized version of Arab culture created by French and British (and later, American) Orientalists. Examples used in the book include critical analyses of the colonial literature of Gustave Flaubert.

Through the critical application of post-structuralism in its scholarship, Orientalism influenced the development of literary theory, cultural criticism, and the field of Middle Eastern studies, especially with regard to how academics practice their intellectual inquiries when examining, describing, and explaining the Middle East. Moreover, the scope of Said's scholarship established Orientalism as a foundational text in the field of post-colonial studies by denoting and examining the connotations of Orientalism, and the history of a given country's post-colonial period.

As a public intellectual, Said debated historians and scholars of area studies, notably historian Bernard Lewis, who described the thesis of Orientalism as "anti-Western" in nature. For subsequent editions of Orientalism, Said wrote an Afterword (1995) and a Preface (2003) addressing discussions of the book as cultural criticism.

== Overview ==
=== "Orientalism" ===
The term Orientalism denotes the exaggeration of difference, the presumption of Western superiority, and the application of clichéd analytical models for perceiving the "Oriental world." This intellectual tradition is the background for Said's presentation of Orientalism as a European viewpoint reflecting a contrived Manichean duality.

As such, Orientalism is the pivotal source of the inaccurate cultural representations that form the foundations of Western thought and perception of the Eastern world, specifically in relation to the Middle East region.

Said distinguishes between at least three separate but interrelated meanings of the term:

1. an academic tradition or field;
2. a worldview, representation, and "style of thought based upon an ontological and epistemological distinction made between 'the Orient' and (most of the time) 'the Occident';" and
3. as a powerful political instrument of domination.

In other words, Said had in mind the "Occidental" (or Western) views of eastern cultures that mirrored the prejudices and ideologies that the colonial experience of Western individuals was shaded by. Said's work drew attention to the obsession of Western writers with women and their role in the preservation (or destruction) of so-called cultural mores, viewing them as either "pristine" (redeemed) or "contaminated" (fallen).

According to an article published by The New Criterion, the principal characteristic of Orientalism is a "subtle and persistent Eurocentric prejudice against Arab-Islamic peoples and their culture," which derives from Western images of what is Oriental (i.e., cultural representations) that reduce the Orient to the fictional essences of "Oriental peoples" and "the places of the Orient;" such representations dominate the discourse of Western peoples with and about non-Western peoples.

These cultural representations usually depict the 'Orient' as primitive, irrational, violent, despotic, fanatic, and essentially inferior to the westerner or native informant, and hence, 'enlightenment' can only occur when "traditional" and "reactionary" values are replaced by "contemporary" and "progressive" ideas that are either western or western-influenced.

In practice, the imperial and colonial enterprises of the West are facilitated by collaborating régimes of Europeanized Arab élites who have internalized the fictional, and romanticized representations of Arabic culture. The idea of the "Orient" was conceptualized by French and English Orientalists during the 18th century, and was eventually adopted in the 20th century by American Orientalists. As such, Orientalist stereotypes of the cultures of the Eastern world have served, and continue to serve, as implicit justifications for the colonial ambitions and the imperial endeavors of the U.S. and the European powers. In that vein, about contemporary Orientalist stereotypes of Arabs and Muslims, Said states:

So far as the United States seems to be concerned, it is only a slight overstatement to say that Moslems and Arabs are essentially seen as either oil suppliers or potential terrorists. Very little of the detail, the human density, the passion of Arab–Moslem life has entered the awareness of even those people whose profession it is to report the Arab world. What we have, instead, is a series of crude, essentialized caricatures of the Islamic world, presented in such a way as to make that world vulnerable to military aggression.

Moving from the assertion that 'pure knowledge' is simply not possible (as all forms of knowledge are inevitably influenced by ideological standpoints), Said sought to explain the connection between ideology and literature. He argued that "Orientalism is not a mere political subject or field that is reflected passively by culture, scholarship, or institutions," but rather "a distribution of geopolitical awareness into aesthetic, scholarly, economic, sociological, historical, and philological texts." European literature for Said carried, actualised, and propelled Orientalist notions forward and constantly reinforced them. Put differently, literature produced by Europeans made possible the domination of the people of the 'East' because of the Orientalist discourse embedded within these texts. Literature here is understood as a kind of carrier and distributor of ideology.

He repeatedly underscored the importance of understanding the intimate relationship between knowledge and power, declaring: "If the knowledge of Orientalism has any meaning, it is in being a reminder of the seductive degradation of knowledge, of any knowledge, anywhere, at any time."

=== Thesis of representation ===
Orientalism (1978) proposes that much of the Western study of Islamic civilization was an exercise in political intellectualism; a psychological exercise in the self-affirmation of "European identity"; not an objective exercise of intellectual enquiry and the academic study of Eastern cultures. Therefore, Orientalism was a method of practical and cultural discrimination that was applied to non-European societies and peoples in order to establish European imperial domination. In justification of empire, the Orientalist claims to know more—essential and definitive knowledge—about the Orient than do the Orientals.

One of the main themes of Said's critique is that the representations of the Orient as "different" from the West are based entirely on accounts taken from textual sources, many of them produced by Westerners. Modern on-the-ground reality is heavily discounted such that the Orient is implicitly disregarded as incapable or not credible to describe itself.

Western writings about the Orient—the perceptions of the East presented in Orientalism—cannot be taken at face value, because they are cultural representations based upon fictional, Western images of the Orient. The history of European colonial rule and political domination of Eastern civilizations distorts the intellectual objectivity of even the most knowledgeable, well-meaning, and culturally sympathetic Western Orientalist; thus did the term "Orientalism" become a pejorative word regarding non–Western peoples and cultures:

I doubt if it is controversial, for example, to say that an Englishman in India, or Egypt, in the later nineteenth century, took an interest in those countries, which was never far from their status, in his mind, as British colonies. To say this may seem quite different from saying that all academic knowledge about India and Egypt is somehow tinged and impressed with, violated by, the gross political fact—and yet that is what I am saying in this study of Orientalism.

The notion of cultural representations as a means for domination and control would remain a central feature of Said's critical approach proposed in Orientalism. Towards the end of his life, Said argued that while representations are essential for the function of human life and societies—as essential as language itself—what must cease are representations that are authoritatively repressive, because they do not provide any real possibilities for those being represented to intervene in this process.

The alternative to an exclusionary representational system for Said would be one that is "participatory and collaborative, non-coercive, rather than imposed," yet he recognised the extreme difficulty involved in bringing about such an alternative due to advances in the "electronic transfer of images" which are increasing media concentration in the hands of powerful, transnational conglomerates. This concentration is of such great magnitude that 'dependent societies' situated outside of the "central metropolitan zones" are reliant upon these systems of representation for information about themselves, known as self-knowledge. For Said, this process of gaining self-knowledge by peripheral societies is insidious, because the system upon which they rely is presented as natural and real, such that it becomes practically unassailable.

=== Geopolitics and cultural hierarchy ===
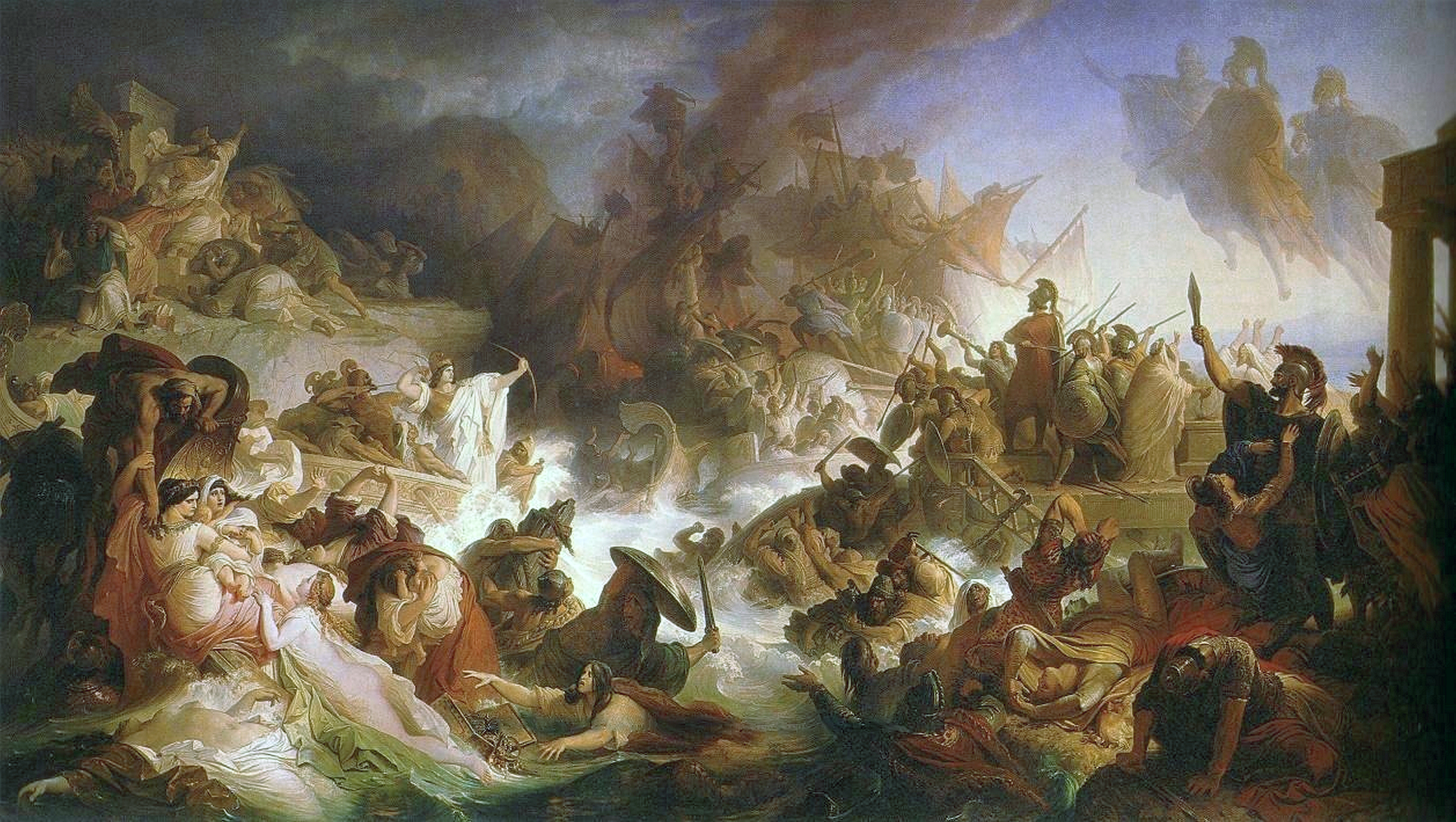
The Sea Battle at Salamis (1868) envisages the Greco-Persian Wars as an East–West clash of civilisations.

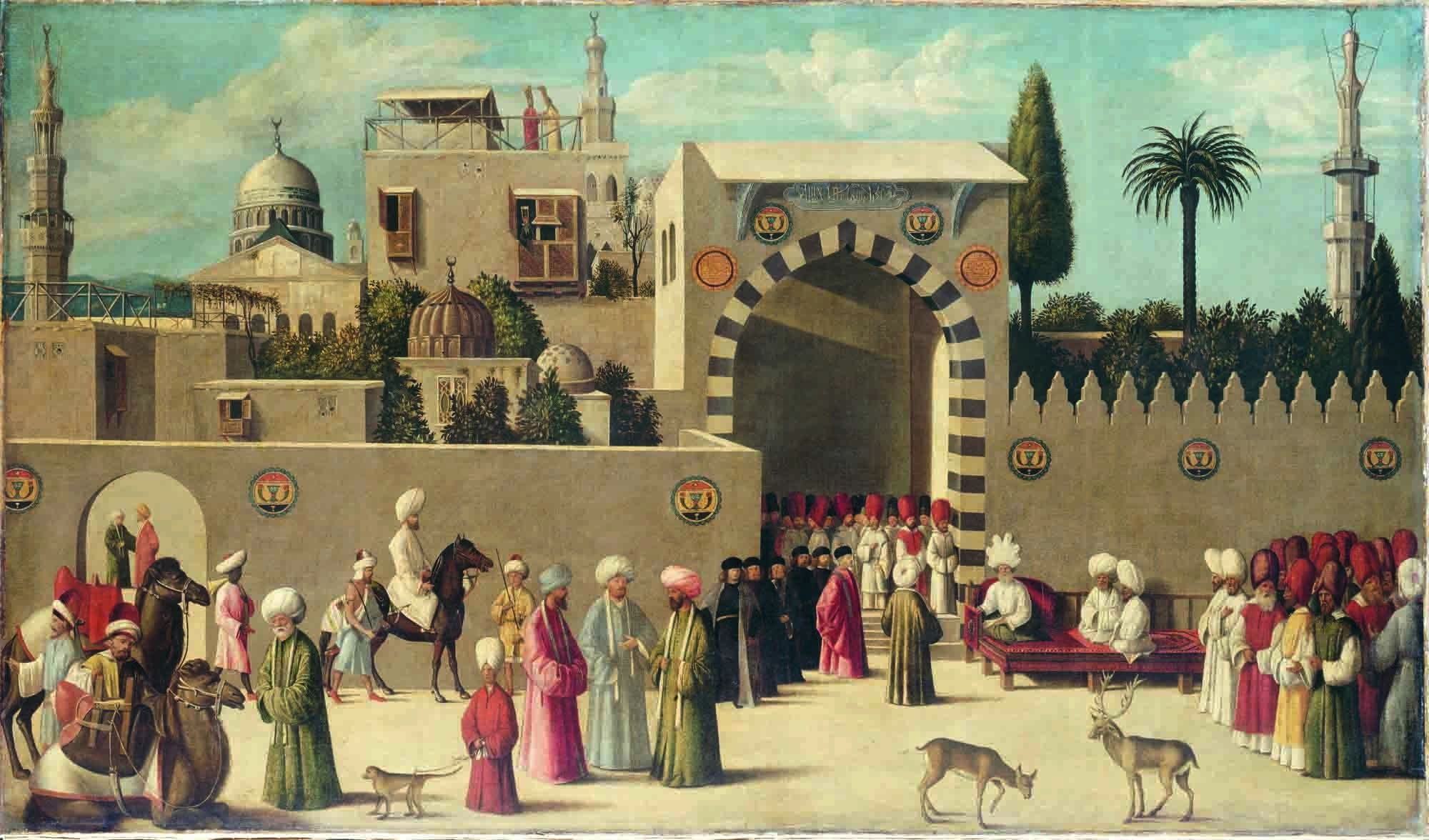
The Reception of the Ambassadors in Damascus (1511) depicts the "Arabic culture" of 16th-century Syria as part of a "romanticized" Orient.

Said said that the Western world sought to dominate the Eastern world for more than 2,000 years, since Classical antiquity (8th c. BC – AD 6th c.), the time of the play The Persians (472 BC), by Aeschylus, which celebrates a Greek victory (Battle of Salamis, 480 BC) against the Persians in the course of the Persian Wars (499–449 BC)—imperial conflict between the Greek West and the Persian East. Europe's long military domination of Asia (empire and hegemony) made unreliable most Western texts about the Eastern world, because of the implicit cultural bias that permeates most Orientalism, which was not recognized by most Western scholars.

In the course of empire, after the physical-and-political conquest, there followed the intellectual conquest of a people, whereby Western scholars appropriated for themselves (as European intellectual property) the interpretation and translation of Oriental languages, and the critical study of the cultures and histories of the Oriental world. In that way, by using Orientalism as the intellectual norm for cultural judgement, Europeans wrote the history of Asia, and invented the "exotic East" and the "inscrutable Orient", which are cultural representations of peoples and things considered inferior to the peoples and things of the West.

The contemporary, historical impact of Orientalism was in explaining the how? and the why? of imperial impotence; in the 1970s, to journalists, academics, and Orientalists, the Yom Kippur War (6–25 October 1973) and the OPEC petroleum embargo (October 1973 – March 1974) were recent modern history. The Western world had been surprised, by the pro-active and decisive actions of non-Western peoples, whom the ideology of Orientalism had defined as essentially weak societies and impotent countries. The geopolitical reality of their actions, of military and economic warfare, voided the fictional nature of Orientalist representations, attitudes, and opinions about the non-Western Other self.

== Influence ==
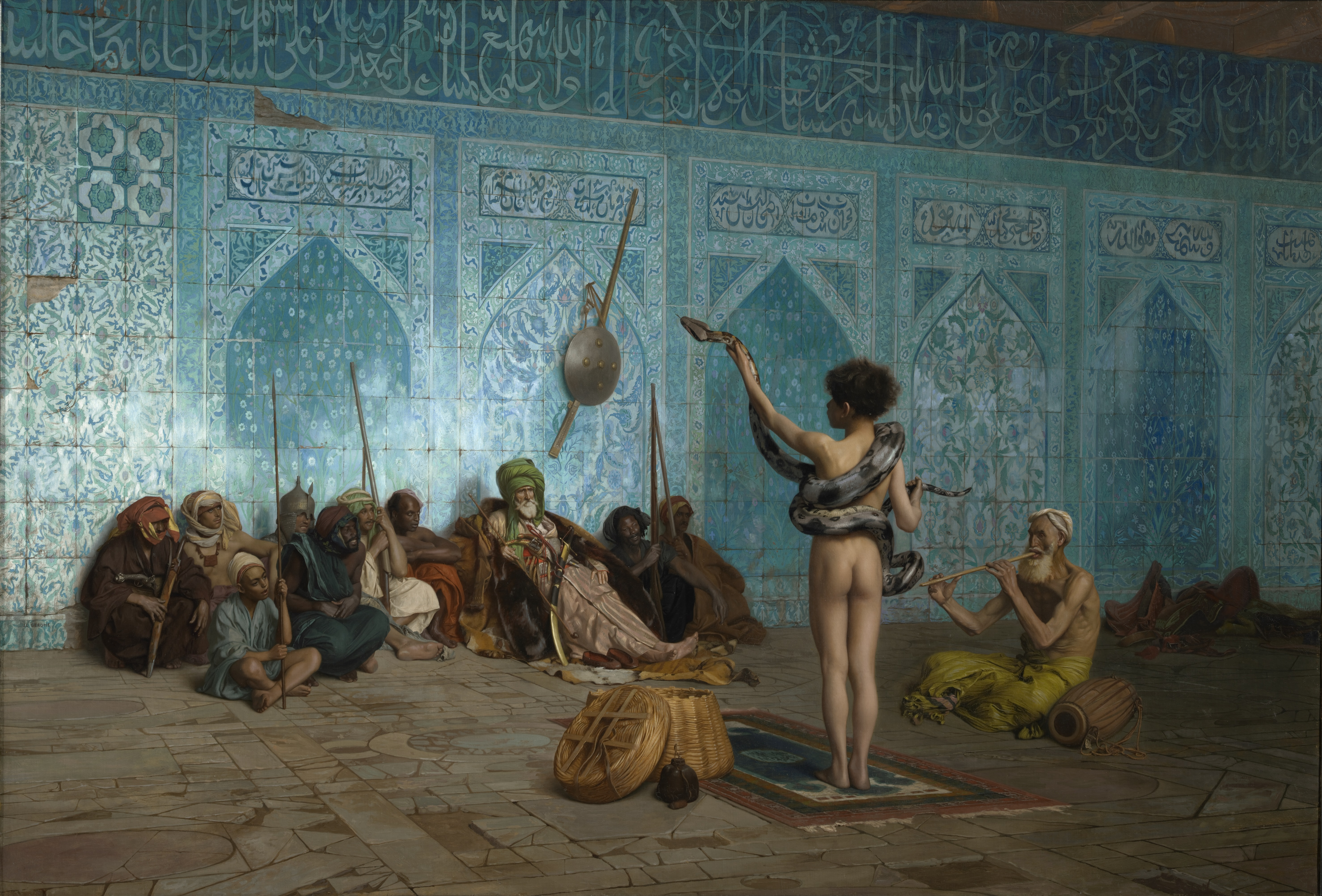
The Eastern world depicted in The Snake Charmer (1880), by Jean-Léon Gérôme, illustrates the sensuous beauty and cultural mystery of the fiction that is "the exotic Orient".

The greatest intellectual impact of Orientalism (1978) was upon the fields of literary theory, cultural studies, history, and human geography, by way of which originated the field of Post-colonial studies. Edward Said's method of post-structuralist analysis derived from the analytic techniques of Jacques Derrida and Michel Foucault; and the perspectives to Orientalism presented by Abdul Latif Tibawi, Anouar Abdel-Malek, Maxime Rodinson, and Richard William Southern.

=== Post-colonial culture studies ===
As a work of cultural criticism, Orientalism (1978) is a foundational document in the field of postcolonialism, providing a framework and method of analysis to answer the how? and the why? of the cultural representations of "Orientals," "The Orient," and "The Eastern world," as presented in the mass-media of the Western world.

Postcolonial theory studies the power and continued dominance of Western ways of intellectual enquiry, as well as the production of knowledge in the academic, intellectual, and cultural spheres of decolonised countries. Said's survey concentrated upon the British and the French varieties of Orientalism that supported the British Empire and the French Empire as commercial enterprises constructed from colonialism, and gave perfunctory coverage, discussion, and analyses of German Orientalist scholarship.

Such disproportional investigation provoked criticism from opponents and embarrassment for supporters of Said, who, in "Orientalism Reconsidered" (1985), said that no single opponent provided a rationale, by which limited coverage of German Orientalism limits either the scholarly value or the practical application of Orientalism as a cultural study. In the Afterword to the 1995 edition of Orientalism, Said presented follow-up refutations of the criticisms that the Orientalist and historian Bernard Lewis made against the book's first edition (1978).

=== Literary criticism ===
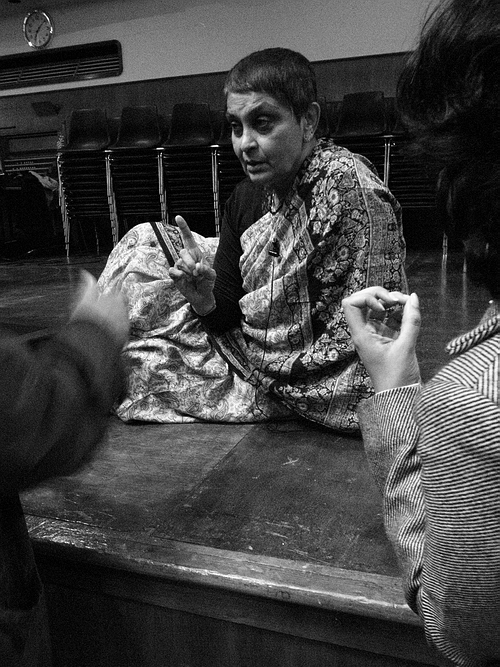
The philosopher and theorist Gayatri Chakravorty Spivak wrote the essay "Can the Subaltern Speak?" which also is a foundational post-colonialism document.

In the fields of literary criticism and of cultural studies, the notable Indian scholars of postcolonialism were Gayatri Chakravorty Spivak (In Other Worlds: Essays in Cultural Politics, 1987), whose essay "Can the Subaltern Speak?" (1988) also became a foundational text of postcolonial culture studies; Homi K. Bhabha (Nation and Narration, 1990); Ronald Inden (Imagining India, 1990); Gyan Prakash ("Writing Post–Orientalist Histories of the Third World: Perspectives from Indian Historiography", 1990); Nicholas Dirks (Castes of Mind, 2001); and Hamid Dabashi (Iran: A People Interrupted, 2007).

In White Mythologies: Writing History and the West (1990), Robert J. C. Young reports post-colonial explanations of the "How?" and the "Why?" of the nature of the post-colonial world, the peoples, and their discontents; which verify the efficacy of the critical method applied in Orientalism (1978), especially in the field of Middle Eastern studies.

In the late 1970s, the survey range of Orientalism (1978) did not include the genre of Orientalist painting or any other visual arts, despite the book-cover featuring a detail-image of The Snake Charmer (1880), a popular, 19th-century Orientalist painting—to which the writer Linda Nochlin applied Said's method of critical analysis "with uneven results." In the field of epistemological studies, Orientalism is an extended application of methods of critical analysis developed by the philosopher Michel Foucault. Anthropologist Talal Asad said that the book Orientalism is:

not only a catalogue of Western prejudices about and misrepresentations of Arabs and Muslims ... [but an investigation and analysis of the] authoritative structure of Orientalist discourse—the closed, self-evident, self-confirming character of that distinctive discourse, which is reproduced, again and again, through scholarly texts, travelogues, literary works of imagination, and the obiter dicta of public men-of-affairs.

Historian Gyan Prakash said that Orientalism describes how "the hallowed image of the Orientalist, as an austere figure, unconcerned with the world and immersed in the mystery of foreign scripts and languages, has acquired a dark hue as the murky business of ruling other peoples, now forms the essential and enabling background of his or her scholarship" about the Orient; without colonial imperialism, there would be no Orientalism.

=== Oriental Europe ===
In Eastern Europe, Milica Bakić-Hayden developed the concept of Nesting Orientalisms (1992), based upon and derived from the work of the historian Larry Wolff (Inventing Eastern Europe: The Map of Civilization on the Mind of the Enlightenment, 1994), and the ideas Said presents in Orientalism (1978).

Bulgarian historian Maria Todorova (Imagining the Balkans, 1997) presented her ethnologic concept of Nesting Balkanisms (Ethnologia Balkanica,1997), which is thematically extended and theoretically derived from Bakić-Hayden's Nesting Orientalisms.

Moreover, in "A Stereotype, Wrapped in a Cliché, Inside a Caricature: Russian Foreign Policy and Orientalism" (2010), James D. J. Brown says that Western stereotypes of Russia, Russianness, and things Russian are cultural representations derived from the literature of "Russian studies," which is a field of enquiry little afflicted with the misconceptions of Russia-as-the-Other, but does display the characteristics of Orientalism—the exaggeration of difference, the presumption of Western cultural superiority, and the application of cliché in analytical models. That overcoming such intellectual malaise requires that area scholars choose to break their "mind-forg'd manacles" and deeply reflect upon the basic cultural assumptions of their area-studies scholarship.

== Criticism ==
Despite the book's wide-ranging influence, some have taken issue with the arguments and assumptions of Orientalism. Critics include Albert Hourani (A History of the Arab Peoples, 1991), Robert Graham Irwin (For Lust of Knowing: The Orientalists and their Enemies, 2006), Nikki Keddie (An Islamic Response to Imperialism, 1968), and Bernard Lewis ("The Question of Orientalism", Islam and the West, 1993).

In a review of a book by Ibn Warraq, American classicist Bruce Thornton dismissed Orientalism as an "incoherent amalgam of dubious postmodern theory, sentimental Third Worldism, glaring historical errors, and Western guilt". Likewise, in the preface paragraphs of a book-review article "Enough Said" (2007), about Dangerous Knowledge (2007), which is the American title for British-published For Lust of Knowing: The Orientalists and Their Enemies by Robert Irwin, Martin Kramer criticized what he said was the way Said turned the term "Orientalism" into a pejorative, saying "In a semantic sleight of hand, Said appropriated the term "Orientalism", as a label for the ideological prejudice he described, thereby, neatly implicating the scholars who called themselves Orientalists."

Nonetheless, the literary critic Paul De Man said that, as a literary critic, "Said took a step further than any other modern scholar of his time, something I dare not do. I remain in the safety of rhetorical analysis, where criticism is the second-best thing I do."

=== History ===
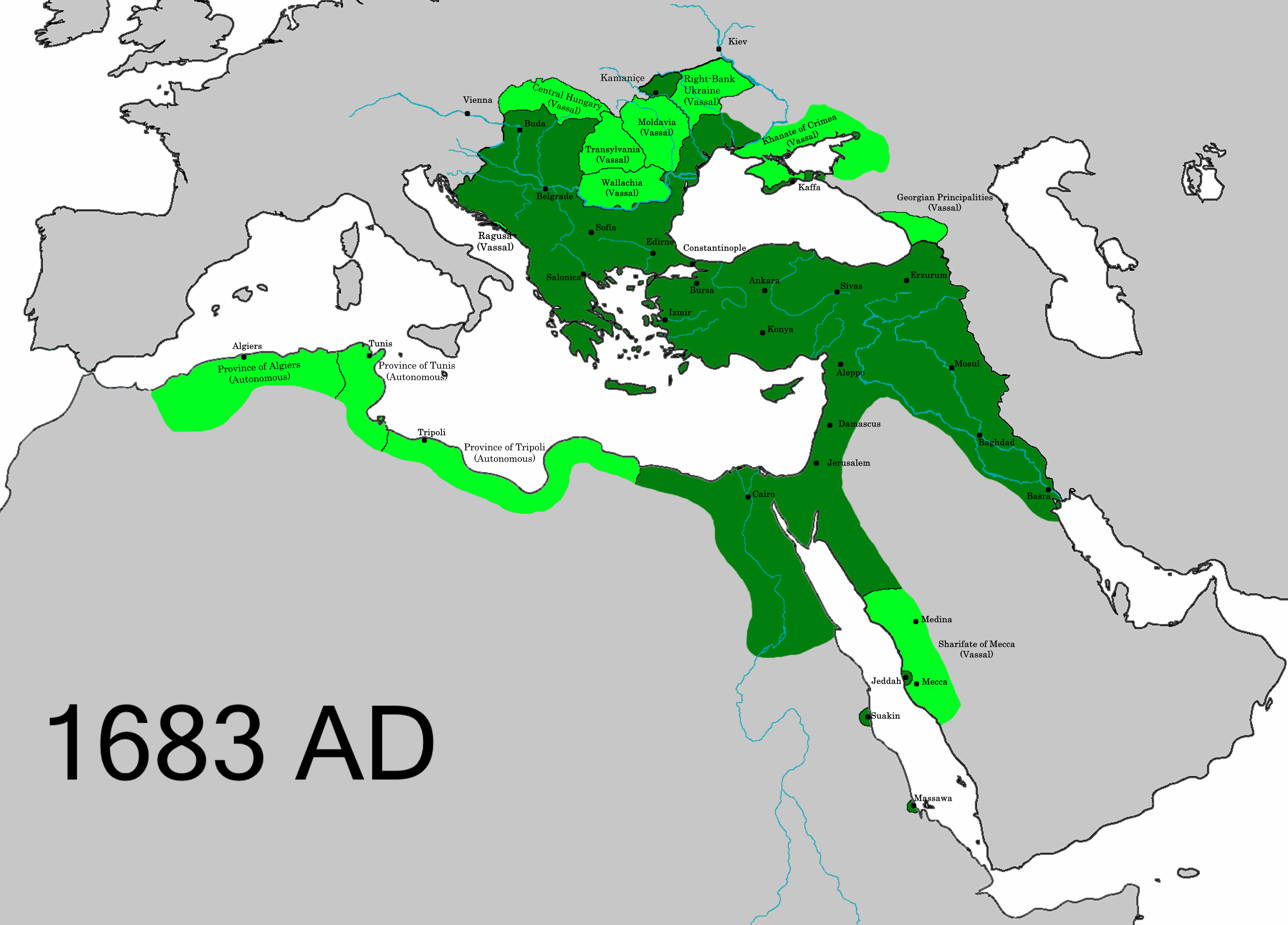
Ernest Gellner argued that the political and military power of the Ottoman Empire (pictured) as a threat to Europe undermined Said's argument that the West had dominated the East for 2,000 years.

Ernest Gellner, in his book review titled "The Mightier Pen? Edward Said and the Double Standards of Inside-out Colonialism: a review of Culture and Imperialism, by Edward Said" (1993), says that Said's contention of Western domination of the Eastern world for more than 2,000 years was unsupportable, because, until the late 17th century, the Ottoman Empire (1299–1923) was a realistic military, cultural, and religious threat to (Western) Europe.

In "Disraeli as an Orientalist: The Polemical Errors of Edward Said" (2005), Mark Proudman noted incorrect 19th-century history in Orientalism, that the geographic extent of the British Empire was not from Egypt to India in the 1880s, because the Ottoman Empire and the Persian Empire in that time intervened between those poles of empire. Moreover, at the zenith of the imperial era, European colonial power in the Eastern world never was absolute, it was relative and much dependent upon local collaborators—princes, rajahs, and warlords—who nonetheless often subverted the imperial and hegemonic aims of the colonialist power.

In For Lust of Knowing: The Orientalists and Their Enemies (2006), Robert Irwin says that Said's concentrating the scope of Orientalism to the Middle East, especially Palestine and Egypt, was a mistake, because the Mandate of Palestine (1920–1948) and British Egypt (1882–1956) were only under direct European control for a short time, in the late 19th and early 20th centuries; thus they are poor examples for Said's theory of Western cultural imperialism. That Orientalism should have concentrated upon noteworthy examples of imperialism and cultural hegemony, such as the British colony of India (1858–1947) and Russian colonies in Asia (1721–1917), but he did not, because, as a public intellectual, Edward Said was more interested in making political points about the politics of the Middle East, in general, and of Palestine, in particular. Moreover, that by unduly concentrating on British and French Orientalism, Said ignored the domination of 19th century Oriental studies by German and Hungarian academics and intellectuals, whose countries did not possess colonies in the East. He frankly states that the "book seems to me to be a work of malignant charlatanry in which it is hard to distinguish honest mistakes from wilful misrepresentations."

Irwin's book was later reviewed by Amir Taheri, writing in Asharq Al-Awsat. He listed certain factual and editing errors, and noted a number of prominent Orientalists were left unmentioned, but says that he believes it to be "the most complete account of Orientalism from the emergence of its modern version in the 19th century to the present day." He also describes it as "a highly enjoyable read both for the specialist and the broadly interested reader."

American scholar of religion Jason Ānanda Josephson has argued that data from Japan complicates Said's thesis about Orientalism as a field linked to imperial power. Not only did Europeans study Japan without any hope of colonizing it, but Japanese academics played a prominent role as informants and interlocutors in this academic discipline, providing information both on their own practices and history and on the history of China. Moreover, Josephson has documented that European conferences on East Asia predate European conferences on the Middle East described by Said, necessitating an alternative chronology of Western academic interest in the Orient.

French orientalist Maxime Rodinson was surprised by the popularity of the book in the United States, calling it a "polemic" and a "bit Stalinist".

=== Professional ===
In the article "Said's Splash" (2001), Martin Kramer says that, fifteen years after the publication of Orientalism (1978), UCLA historian Nikki Keddie (whom Said praised in Covering Islam, 1981) who originally had praised Orientalism as an "important, and, in many ways, positive" book, had changed her mind. In Approaches to the History of the Middle East (1994), Keddie criticises Said's work on Orientalism, for the unfortunate consequences upon her profession as an historian:

I think that there has been a tendency in the Middle East field to adopt the word "orientalism" as a generalized swear-word, essentially referring to people who take the "wrong" position on the Arab–Israeli dispute, or to people who are judged too "conservative". It has nothing to do with whether they are good or not good in their disciplines. So, "orientalism", for many people, is a word that substitutes for thought and enables people to dismiss certain scholars and their works. I think that is too bad. It may not have been what Edward Said meant at all, but the term has become a kind of slogan.

=== Thesis ===
Douglas Murray criticized the central point of the thesis that Westerners encountered other societies through the lens of the societies they came from:

After all, through what other lens might Western travelers and scholars have been expected to look at the Orient? Could they have been expected to look at the Middle East through Chinese eyes? Or Middle Eastern eyes? And why should Western explorers, linguists, and others be held to such a strange standard? It would be curious indeed to expect Arabs to have looked at Europe through European eyes. Or for the Chinese to look at the Middle East through Aboriginal eyes. Everybody approaches a different culture through references they have picked up in the culture they are from. There is nothing sinister about this. It is inevitable.

In the central thesis and many other cases, Said held the West to standards expected of no other society and then castigated the West for failing to live up to these standards.

=== Literature ===
In the article, "Edward Said's Shadowy Legacy" (2008), Robert Irwin says that Said ineffectively distinguished among writers of different centuries and genres of Orientalist literature. That the disparate examples, such as the German poet Johann Wolfgang von Goethe (1749–1832) who never travelled to the Orient; the French novelist Gustave Flaubert (1821–1880) who briefly toured Egypt; the French Orientalist Ernest Renan (1823–1892), whose anti-Semitism voided his work; and the British Arabist Edward William Lane (1801–1876), who compiled the Arabic–English Lexicon (1863–93)—did not constitute a comprehensive scope of investigation or critical comparison. In that vein, in Defending the West: A Critique of Edward Said's Orientalism (2007), Ibn Warraq earlier had said that in Orientalism (1978) Said had constructed a binary-opposite representation, a fictional European stereotype that would counter-weigh the Oriental stereotype. Being European is the only common trait among such a temporally and stylistically disparate group of literary Orientalists.

=== Philosophy ===
In The Asiatic Society of Bengal and the Discovery of India's Past (1988), O. P. Kejariwal says that with the creation of a monolithic Occidentalism to oppose the Orientalism of Western discourse with the Eastern world, Said had failed to distinguish between the paradigms of Romanticism and the Enlightenment, and ignored the differences among Orientalists; and that he failed to acknowledge the positive contributions of Orientalists who sought kinship between the East and the West, rather than to create an artificial "difference" of cultural inferiority and superiority; such a man was William Jones (1746–1794), the British philologist–lexicographer who proposed that Indo–European languages are interrelated.

In the essay "The Debate About 'Orientalism'", Harry Oldmeadow says that "Said’s treatment of Orientalism, particularly the assertion of the necessary nexus with imperialism, is over-stated and unbalanced." He objected to Said's view that Western Orientalists were projecting upon the "artificial screen" called 'the East' or 'the Orient', but that such projection was only a small part of the relationship. That Said failed to adequately distinguish between the genuine experiences of the Orient and the cultural projections of Westerners. He further criticized Said for using reductionist models of religion and spirituality, that are based on "Marxist/Foucauldian/psychoanalytic thought."

George Landlow argued that Said assumed that such projection and its harmful consequences are a purely Western phenomenon, when in reality all societies do this to each other. This was a particular issue given Said treated Western colonialism as unique, which Landlow regarded as unsatisfactory for a work of serious scholarship.

=== Cultural turn ===
Several scholars have critiqued Orientalism and Said's embrace of the cultural turn as a means of explaining colonialism. Vivek Chibber has highlighted how Orientalism argues that orientalist discourse was both a cause and an effect of colonialism - that on the one hand, orientalist scholarship (described by Said as "manifest orientalism") developed from the eighteenth century as a means of justifying the process of imperialist expansion, whilst on the other, a deeply ingrained tradition of broader orientalist depictions of the East stretching back to the classical era (which Said labelled "latent orientalism") played a role in creating the conditions for the launching of colonial projects. Whilst the first claim had previously been made by anti-colonial thinkers, the latter was novel.

In the years after Orientalism was published, Said's arguments were critiqued by Sadiq Jalal al-Azm and Aijaz Ahmad. In 1981 Al-Azm suggested that conceiving of orientalism as "the natural product of an ancient and almost irresistible European bent of mind to misrepresent the realities of other cultures, peoples, and their languages, in favour of Occidental self-affirmation" served to reinforce the essentialism that was at the heart of orientalism, rather than challenging it, i.e. that the West is inherently incapable of understanding the East. Just over ten years later Ahmad raised two criticisms of Said's assertions: firstly, that according to Said orientalist views were so pervasive that he did not differentiate critics of colonialism such as Karl Marx from supporters of imperialism, despite the role of Marxists in anti-colonial struggles across the world, and secondly that Said's suggestion of cultural causes for imperialism displaced older Marxist, nationalist and liberal analyses based on the interests of economic classes, nations and individuals in favour of a "Clash of Civilizations" thesis.

In his book Why Marx Was Right, Terry Eagleton states that Postcolonialism arose "around the time when the struggles for national liberation had more or less run their course", noting Said's work as foundational to Postcolonialism, Terry Eagleton states that it "appeared in the mid-1970s, just as a severe crisis of capitalism was rolling back the revolutionary spirit in the West. It is perhaps significant in this respect that Said’s book is quite strongly anti-Marxist.".

More recently, Chibber has pointed out that essentialist and ethnocentric portrayals of foreign cultures can be found in pre-colonial Eastern civilisations as well: whilst Said acknowledged that "all cultures impose corrections upon raw reality", Chibber has argued that this fact weakens the contention that such essentialism was itself a cause of colonialism, since the latter was practiced by a relatively small number of mostly Western European countries. Regarding a weaker interpretation of Said's thesis - that latent orientalism was a necessary but not sufficient prerequisite for colonialism - Chibber contends that economic and political factors are universally accepted as contributory causes of colonialism, that these in themselves would generate pressure for arguments to legitimise imperial projects, and therefore a case cannot be made that pre-existing latent orientalism was indispensable for the rise of colonialism.

=== Personality ===
In the sociological article, "Review: Who is Afraid of Edward Said?" (1999) Biswamoy Pati said that in making ethnicity and cultural background the tests of moral authority and intellectual objectivity in studying the Oriental world, Said drew attention to his personal identity as a Palestinian and as a subaltern of the British Empire, in the Near East. Therefore, from the perspective of the Orientalist academic, Said's personal background might, arguably, exclude him from writing about the Oriental world, hindered by an upper-class birth, an Anglophone upbringing, a British-school education in Cairo, residency in the U.S., a university-professor job; and categorical statements, such as: "any and all representations...are embedded, first, in the language, and then, in the culture, institutions, and political ambience of the representer...[the cultural representations are] interwoven with a great many other things, besides 'the Truth', which is, itself, a representation."

Hence, in the article "Orients and Occidents: Colonial Discourse Theory and the Historiography of the British Empire", D.A. Washbrook said that Said and his academic cohort indulge in excessive cultural relativism, which intellectual excess traps them in a "web of solipsism," which limits conversation exclusively to "cultural representations" and to denying the existence of any objective truth. That Said and his followers fail to distinguish between the types and degrees of Orientalism represented by the news media and popular culture (e.g., the Orientalism of the film Indiana Jones and the Temple of Doom, 1984), and heavy academic Orientalism about the language and literature, history and culture of the peoples of the Eastern world.

In the article "Orientalism Now" (1995), historian Gyan Prakash says that Edward Said had explored fields of Orientalism already surveyed by his predecessors and contemporaries, such as V. G. Kiernan, Bernard S. Cohn, and Anwar Abdel Malek, who also had studied, reported, and interpreted the social relationship that makes the practice of imperialism intellectually, psychologically, and ethically feasible; that is, the relationship between European imperial rule and European representations of the non-European Other self, the colonised people. That, as an academic investigator, Said already had been preceded in the critical analysis of the production of Orientalist knowledge and about Western methods of Orientalist scholarship, because, in the 18th century, "Abd al-Rahman al-Jabarti [1753–1825], the Egyptian chronicler, and a witness to Napoleon's invasion of Egypt in 1798, for example, had no doubt that the expedition was as much an epistemological as military conquest". Nonetheless, George Landow, of Brown University, who criticized Said's scholarship and contested his conclusions, acknowledged that Orientalism is a major work of cultural criticism.

=== Posthumous ===
In October 2003, one month after the death of Edward Said, the Lebanese newspaper Daily Star recognized the intellectual import of the book, saying "Said's critics agree with his admirers that he has single-handedly effected a revolution in Middle Eastern studies in the U.S." and that "U.S. Middle Eastern Studies were taken over, by Edward Said's postcolonial studies paradigm."

== See also ==
- Leone Caetani
- René Guénon
- Postcolonialism
- Subaltern
- Lila Abu-Lughod
- Occidentalism
- Ornamentalism
- Imagined geographies
