= National Commissions for UNESCO =

National Commissions for UNESCO are national organizations that were established by Member States of UNESCO and which are the only such bodies in the whole UN system.

The national commissions were established under Article VII of the Constitution of the UNESCO by UNESCO member countries on a permanent basis, and are associated with the government bodies of the member countries. Currently, there are 198 such National Commissions.

== History ==
During the Cold War different national commissions in different Balkan states initiated counter-hegemonic cultural rapprochement and cooperation between isolationist Albania, Warsaw Pact countries of Bulgaria and Romania, NATO member states of Greece, Turkey and Non-Aligned Yugoslavia when in 1963 in Bucharest they established International Association of South-East European Studies.
