= Memoirs of a Dervish =

Book by Robert Irwin

Memoirs of a Dervish: Sufis, Mystics and the Sixties
- Front cover of Memoirs of a Dervish
- Author: Robert Irwin
- Language: English
- Genre: Autobiography, memoirs
- Publisher: Profile Books, London
- Publication date: 14 April 2011
- Publication place: United Kingdom
- Media type: Print (Paperback)
- Pages: 288 pp.
- ISBN: 978-1-86197-991-9

Memoirs of a Dervish: Sufis, Mystics and the Sixties is a 2011 autobiography by Robert Irwin, a British historian, novelist, and writer on Arabic literature.

== Synopsis ==
In the summer of 1964, the author left behind the popular culture of the "Swinging Sixties" in England, a time when many were journeying to the East in search of spiritual enlightenment. In the book, he contrasts that hippie subculture with the "bombs and guns and [Sufi] mysticism" which he encountered on his own travels in Algeria.

== Reception ==
In the Financial Times, Rory MacLean writes that the author "has given retrospective shape to his youth and formed a true story that will last forever, or at least until the pages of this wonderful, bittersweet memoir crumble into dust."

Steve Jelbert writes in The Independent that "the sheer strangeness of Irwin's quest [...] impresses. He goes on to say that "Irwin's witty, casually erudite tribute to his clever, naïve youth shows that there are no short cuts to wisdom. But it often comes with age."

Mick Brown, writing in Literary Review is of the opinion that "Irwin brilliantly conjures the mood of the late Sixties, with its blind innocence, fanciful enthusiasms and blissful music."

In the New Statesman, John Gray writes that "Robert Irwin begins one of the most delightfully diverting explorations of the byways of memory to have appeared in many years - and one of the most profound" and finds "the core of the book [to be] a sincere spiritual search, recounted with rare candour and arresting insight."

Writing in The Spectator, Anthony Sattin finds the book "a more enlightening type of memoir" than what he sees as the current fad of the "misery memoir". Sattin describes the work as "haunting" and goes on to say that the book "conveys with power and eloquence the writer's gratitude for having nourished the spiritual side of life and his disapproval of the way that many Muslims today interpret the Qur'an."

== See also ==
- Arabist
- Dervish
- Orientalism
