= Nesting Orientalisms =

Concept introduced by Milica Bakić-Hayden

Nesting Orientalisms is a concept introduced by Serbian scholar Milica Bakić-Hayden, a visiting lecturer at the University of Pittsburgh. It is based on gradation of "Orients", i.e. otherness and primitiveness.

== Background ==
As developed by Milica Bakić-Hayden, Nesting Orientalisms is a conceptual variant of Edward Said's theory of Orientalism; an additional influence is Larry Wolff, but, in fact, she already had used the term 'Nesting Orientalism' in the article 'Orientalist Variations on the Theme "Balkans": Symbolic Geography in Recent Yugoslav Cultural Politics" (1992), co-author Robert Hayden, before Wolff published Inventing Eastern Europe.

== The concept ==
This concept explains "a tendency of each region to view the cultures and religions to its South and East as more conservative and primitive". It explains how a group which creates the Orientalized other can also be the subject of Orientalization by another group, and so on. According to this concept Asia is more "east" or "other" than Eastern Europe. Within Eastern Europe the Balkans is perceived as most "eastern". Such hierarchy continues within the Balkans.

=== Nesting Balkanisms ===
In the case of the Balkans there are many rankings connected with this concept, which "play a significant role in . . . identity building [and proclaiming] a more prestigious position within a generally negatively assessed entity". Proclaiming one's European character was a tool in creating the pattern of "nesting orientalisms" in the Balkans.

Hence, Bulgarian historian Maria Todorova introduced the related concept of "nesting balkanisms". Todorova emphasized the importance of this concept in identity constructions, which in the case of the Balkans involve the dual perception of the Balkans as a part of Europe but also as in opposition, as the "darker side" of Europe.

=== Nesting Colonialisms ===
Another concept related to the concept of nesting orientalisms was introduced by Tanja Petrović, a Serbian anthropologist from Slovenia: that of "nesting colonialisms", which is marked by parallels and analogies of the European Union and the rest of the world, which are perceived as former colonial powers and former colonies. This concept provides members of European Union, no matter whether they had a colonial past or not, with a "pool" of discursive patterns used for exclusion of those who are outside the European Union.

=== Nesting Occidentalisms ===
Bulgarian intellectuals have modified the concept of Nesting Orientalisms into the reversed concept of Nesting Occidentalisms.

== See also ==
- Orientalism
- Occidentalism
