= The Snake Charmer =

Painting by Jean-Léon Gérôme

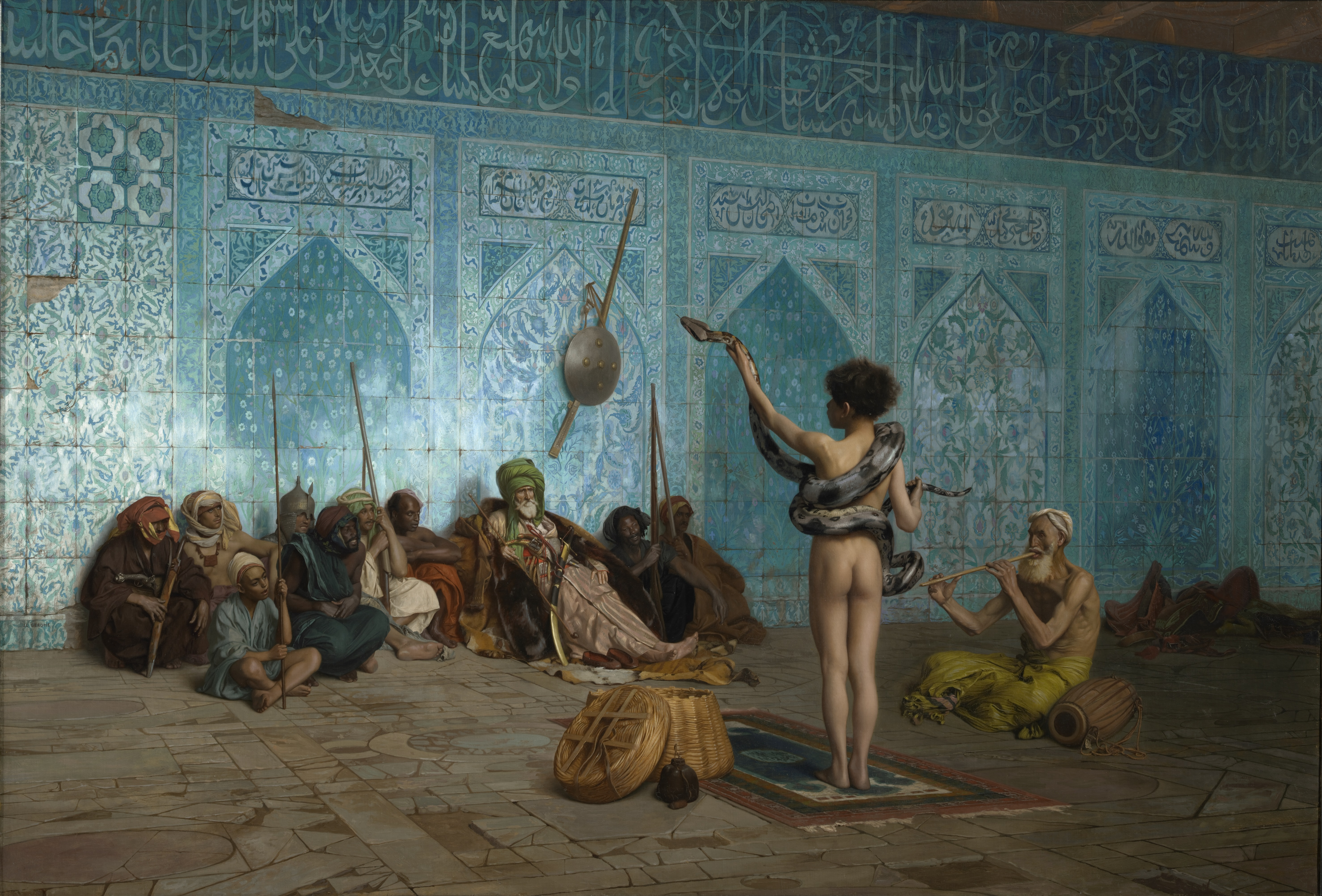
- Artist: Jean-Léon Gérôme
- Year: c. 1879
- Medium: Oil on canvas
- Dimensions: 82.2 cm × 121 cm (32.4 in × 48 in)
- Location: Sterling and Francine Clark Art Institute; Williamstown, Massachusetts

The Snake Charmer is an oil-on-canvas painting by French artist Jean-Léon Gérôme produced around 1879. After it was used on the cover of Edward Said's book Orientalism in 1978, the work "attained a level of notoriety matched by few Orientalist paintings," as it became a lightning-rod for criticism of Orientalism in general and Orientalist painting in particular, although Said himself does not mention the painting in his book. It is in the collection of the Sterling and Francine Clark Art Institute, which also owns another controversial Gérôme painting, The Slave Market.

== Subject and setting ==
The painting depicts a naked boy standing on a small carpet in the center of a room with blue-tiled walls, facing away from the viewer, holding a python which coils around his waist and over his shoulder, while an older man sits to his right playing a fipple flute. The performance is watched by a motley group of armed men from a variety of Islamic tribes, with different clothes and weapons.

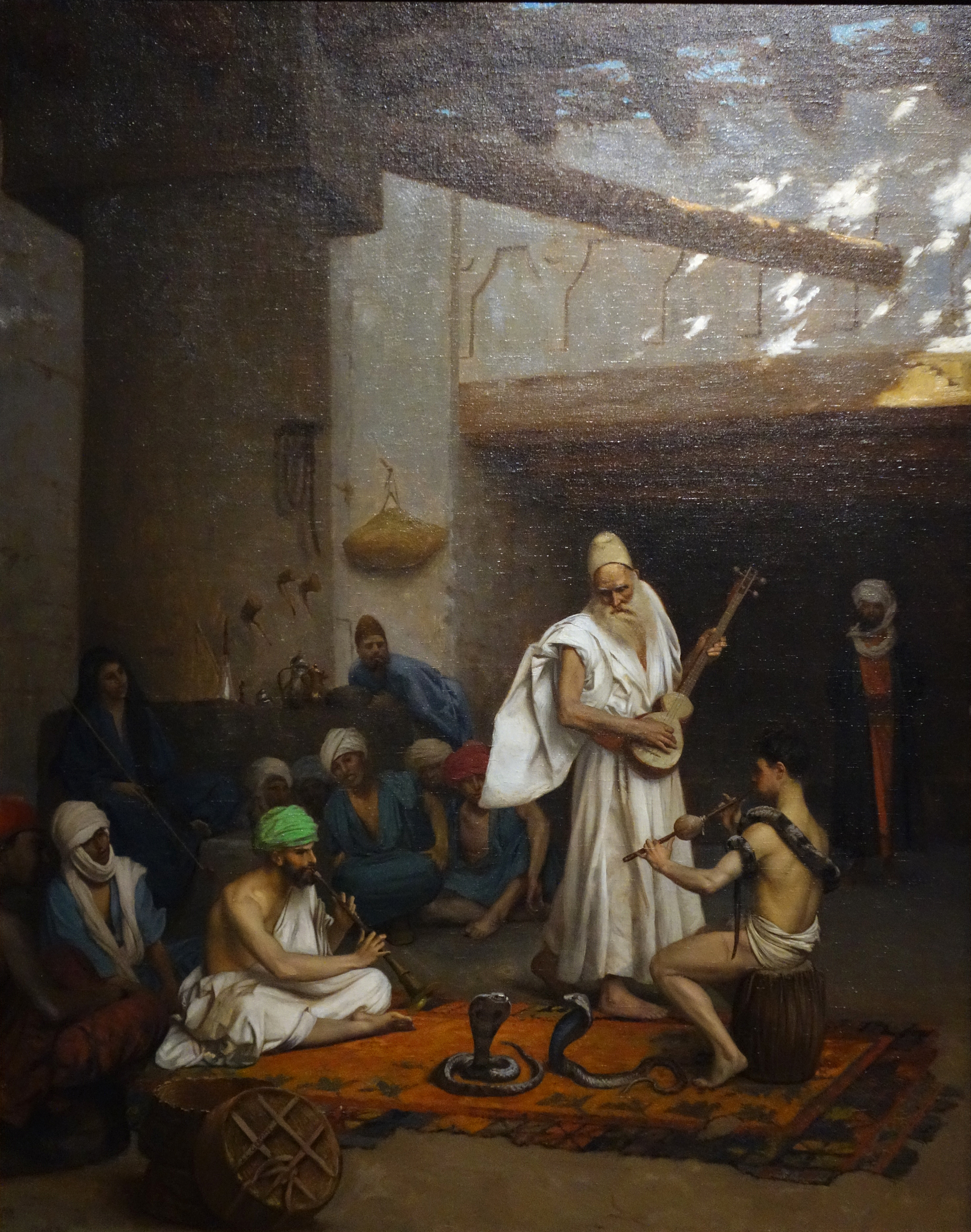
Another painting by Gérôme entitled The Snake Charmer, date unknown, New Orleans Museum of Art.

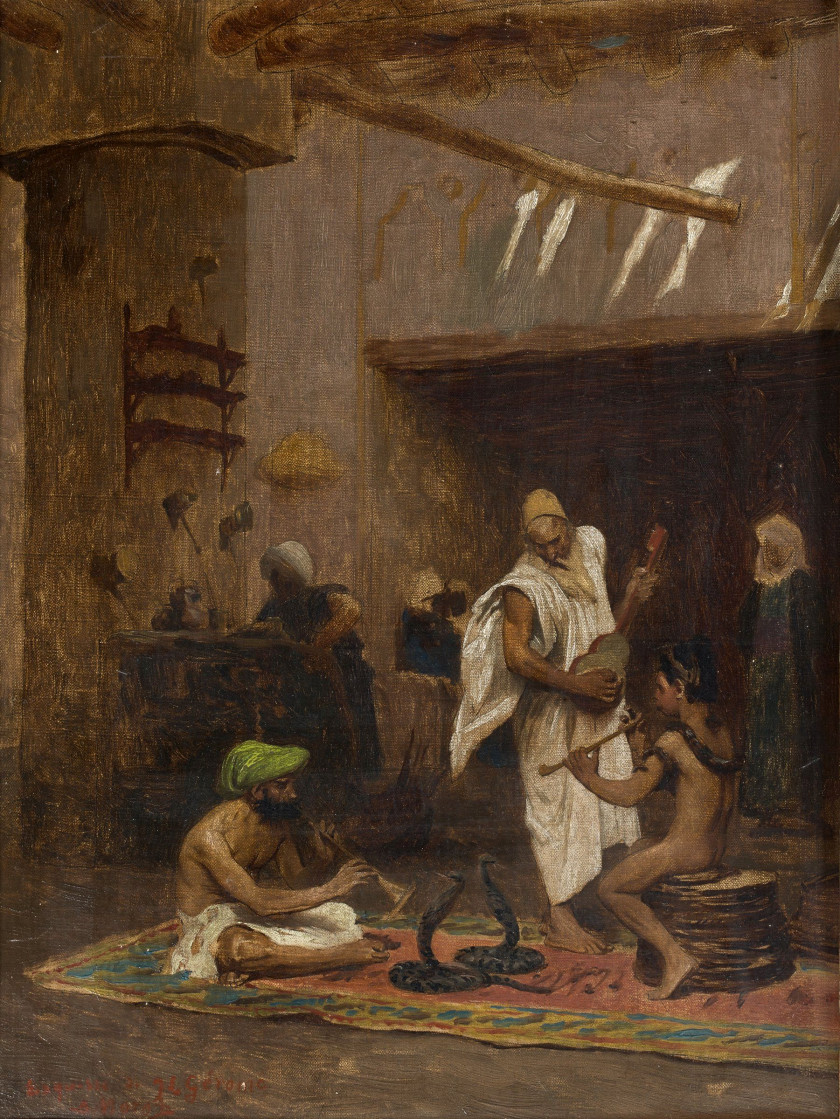
Jean-Léon Gérôme and Aimé Morot, study for The Snake Charmer, by 1877, private collection.

Sarah Lees' catalogue essay for the painting examines the setting as a conflation of Ottoman Turkey and Egypt, and also explains the young snake charmer's nudity, not as an erotic display, but "to obviate charges of fraud" in his performance:

The Snake Charmer…brings together widely disparate, even incompatible, elements to create a scene that, as is the case with much of his oeuvre, the artist could not possibly have witnessed. Snake charming was not part of Ottoman culture, but it was practiced in ancient Egypt and continued to appear in that country during the nineteenth century. Maxime du Camp, for example, described witnessing a snake charmer in Cairo during his 1849–51 trip with Gustave Flaubert in terms that are comparable to Gérôme’s depiction, including mention of the young male disrobing in order to obviate charges of fraud. The artist has placed this performance, however, in a hybrid, fictional space that derives from identifiably Turkish, as well as Egyptian, sources.

The blue tiles are inspired by İznik panels in the Altınyol (Golden Passage) and Baghdad Kiosk of Topkapı Palace in Ottoman-era Constantinople. Some parts of the inscriptions on the walls cannot easily be read, but "the large frieze at the top of the painting, running from right to left, is perfectly legible. It is the famous Koranic verse 256 from Surah II, al-Baqara, The Cow, written in thuluth script, and reads: "There is no compulsion in religion—the right way is indeed clearly distinct from error. So whoever disbelieves in the devil and believes in Allah, he indeed lays hold on the firmest handle which shall never break. And Allah is Hearing, Knowing". Ibn Warraq explains that the inscription thereafter is truncated and is "probably not a Koranic verse but rather a dedication to a caliph".

Regarding the snake depicted, "Richard G. Zweifel, a herpetologist from the American Museum of Natural History…commented that 'the snake looks more like a South American boa constrictor than anything else,' a possibility that would add yet another layer of hybridity to the image. Gérôme could perhaps have studied such an animal at the Jardin des Plantes in Paris."

== Provenance and exhibition ==
The painting was sold by Gérôme's dealer Goupil et Cie in 1880 to U.S. collector Albert Spencer for 75,000 francs. Spencer sold it to Alfred Corning Clark in 1888 for $19,500, who in 1893 loaned it for exhibition at the World’s Columbian Exposition in Chicago. His wife and heir Elizabeth Scriven Clark loaned it to the Metropolitan Museum of Art before selling it to Schaus Art Galleries in 1899 for $10,000 or $12,000, in a transaction that might also have involved receipt of another artwork. It was acquired in 1902 by August Heckscher for an unknown price, then reacquired by Clark's son Robert Sterling Clark in 1942 for $500—a striking example of Gérôme's fall from favor with collectors. (Prices for his work have rebounded greatly in the 21st century, with paintings selling for millions of dollars.) Since 1955 The Snake Charmer has been in the collection of the Sterling and Francine Clark Art Institute, in Williamstown, Massachusetts.

The Snake Charmer was included in the exhibition The Spectacular Art of Jean-Léon Gérôme (1824–1904) at the Getty Museum in 2010 and the Musée d'Orsay in 2010-2011.

== Reception ==
In 1978, the painting was used as the front cover of Edward Said's book Orientalism. "Since he defined his project as an examination of textual representations, Said never once mentioned Gérôme’s painting, but numerous subsequent authors have examined aspects of the artist’s work, and this painting in particular, in relation to the concept of Orientalism that Said defined."

A detail of the painting is also used as part of the cover design of Peter Lamborn Wilson's book Scandal: Essays in Islamic Heresy, as published by Autonomedia.

Art critic Jonathan Jones bluntly calls The Snake Charmer

a sleazy imperialist vision of "the east." In front of glittering Islamic tiles that make the painting shimmer with blue and silver, a group of men sit on the ground watching a nude snake charmer, draped with a slithering phallic python.…The Snake Charmer is such an obviously pernicious and exploitative western fantasy of "the Orient" that it makes Said's case for him. Gérôme is, you might say, orientalism's poster boy. In this influential work, Said analyses how Middle Eastern societies were described by European "experts" in the 19th century in ways that delighted the western imagination while reducing the humanity of those whom that imagination fed on. In The Snake Charmer, voyeurism is titillated, and yet the blame for this is shifted on to the slumped audience in the painting. Meanwhile, the beautiful tiles behind them are seen as a survival of older and finer cultures which–according to Edward Said–western orientalists claimed to know and love better than the decadent locals did.

Linda Nochlin in her influential 1983 essay "The Imaginary Orient" points out that the seemingly photorealistic quality of the painting allows Gérôme to present an unrealistic scene as if it were a true representation of the east. Nochlin calls The Snake Charmer "a visual document of nineteenth-century colonialist ideology" in which

the watchers huddled against the ferociously detailed tiled wall in the background of Gérôme's painting are resolutely alienated from us, as is the act they watch with such childish, trancelike concentration. Our gaze is meant to include both the spectacle and its spectators as objects of picturesque delectation.…Clearly, these black and brown folk are mystified—but then again, so are we. Indeed, the defining mood of the painting is mystery, and it is created by a specific pictorial device. We are permitted only a beguiling rear view of the boy holding the snake. A full frontal view, which would reveal unambiguously both his sex and the fullness of his dangerous performance, is denied us. And the insistent, sexually charged mystery at the center of this painting signifies a more general one: the mystery of the East itself, a standard topos of the Orientalist ideology.

In 2010, Ibn Warraq (the pen name of an anonymous author critical of Islam) published a polemic about Nochlin and her work, mounting a defense of Gérôme and Orientalist painting in general, "Linda Nochlin and The Imaginary Orient."

== See also ==
- Boa Charmer in a Harem at Cairo
