= Ivan Dorovský =

Czech poet, historian, translator, author, and university professor (1935–2021)

- Born: 18 May 1935; Greece
- Died: 24 August 2021 (aged 86); Brno, Czech Republic
- Citizenship: Czechoslovak, Czech
- Occupations: Slavist, Balkanologist

Academic work
- Main interests: Balkanology

Ivan Dorovský (18 May 1935 – 24 August 2021) was a Czech Balkanologist of Macedonian origin. He worked as a literary scholar, translator, poet and publicist, university professor at Masaryk University, and Slavist. He was also the Chairman of the Society of Friends of the South Slavs. He was the 2008 recipient of the Macedonian honorary Racin Recognition for his contribution and affirmation of Macedonian literature and culture, and the 2013 recipient of the F. A. Zach Prize for his contribution to the relationship with the Serbian nation.

He left Greece as a child during the civil war.

== Life ==
He studied Russian and Bulgarian at the Faculty of Arts of Masaryk University in Brno. After graduation he worked briefly as a high school professor, then from 1961 lectured at the University of Brno and in 1987 he was appointed full professor. His scientific and artistic activities spanned several fields: literary science, linguistics, ethnography and folklore studies, history, and cultural studies. He was an elected member (14 May 1979) of the Macedonian Academy of Sciences and Arts in Skopje. He regularly organized and led Balkanology symposia at the Masaryk University in Brno. He was also named (2000) honorary professor at Ss. Cyril and Methodius University of Skopje.

== Work ==
He was the author of many monographs and dictionaries. He compiled medallions of Macedonian, Serbian, Slovenian, Croatian, Bulgarian, Albanian and other authors. His bibliography of over 2000 items included his scientific, journalistic and artistic works, not only citations themselves, but also some reviews of publications. He was interested in Balkan and Slavic studies, especially in the history of literature, folklore, ethnography and languages of the Balkan Slavic and non-Slavic peoples, and his research extended to Russian studies as well. In 2014, he published a memoir entitled With Home in My Heart.

Selected publications:

- České země a Balkán: kapitoly z dějin česko-makedonských a makedonsko-českých styků. 1973
- Konstantin Jireček – život a dílo. 1983
- Rajko Žinzifov: vozdejstvije russkoj i ukrainskoj literatury na jego tvorčestvo. 1988
- Studii za balkanskiot literaturen proces vo 19 i 20 vek. 1992
- Dramatické umění jižních Slovanů. 1 (1918–1941). 1995
- Ivan Dorovský: Bibliografie 1995
- Charváti ještě žijí mezi námi. 1996
- Česko-charvátský slovník. 1996
- Balkán a Mediterán : Literárně historické a teoretické studie. 1997
- Makedonci žijí mezi námi. 1998
- Studie z literárněvědné slavistiky. 1999
- Slovník balkánských spisovatelů. 2001
- Studia slavica et balkanica. 2001
- Mickiewicz, Puškin a Balkán. 2001
- Ilinden je v nás. Ilinden e vo nas. To Ilinten ine mesa mas. Ilinden is within us. 2003
- Vozdejstvoto na ruskata i ukrainskata literatura vrz tvoreštvoto na Rajko Žiznifov. 2003
- Recepce literatury jižních Slovanů u nás. 2004
- With Home in My Heart. 2014
- Studia Macedonica II. 2015

== See also ==
- Balkan studies
- Slavic studies
