= The Arabian Nightmare =

1983 novel by Robert Irwin

The Arabian Nightmare is a novel by Robert Irwin published in 1983. The Arabian Nightmare was inspired by The Arabian Nights, as well as the novel The Manuscript Found in Saragossa by Jan Potocki.

== Plot summary ==
The Arabian Nightmare is a novel in which Cairo of 1486 is under the rule of the Mamluk Sultanate. The protagonist is Balian of Norwich, an Englishman going to a pilgrimage to the view the relics of Saint Catherine in the Sinai Desert, while also working as a spy for the French court. After Balian arrives in Cairo, he falls asleep and begins to have a series of disturbing dreams.

== Reception ==
Dave Langford reviewed The Arabian Nightmare for White Dwarf #69, and stated that "It is a dream without awakening (says the blurb), a flight without escape, a tale without end. I liked it a lot." John Clute, reviewing The Arabian Nightmare, stated "The Arabian Nightmare is a joy to read. As a teacher of medieval history who has published in the field, Irwin clearly knows Mameluke Egypt very thoroughly indeed and has anchored his most fantastical flights with details that seem clearly authentic".

== Reviews ==
- Review by Brian Stableford (1984) in Fantasy Review, October 1984
- Review by Maureen Porter (1987) in Vector 141 (p 20)
- Review by Don D'Ammassa (1988) in Science Fiction Chronicle, #102 March 1988
- Review by Robert K. J. Killheffer (1989) in The New York Review of Science Fiction, May 1989
