= Balcanica =

Balcanica - Annual of the Institute for Balkan Studies
- Discipline: European studies
- Language: English, French
- Edited by: Vojislav G. Pavlović

Publication details
- History: 1970–present
- Publisher: Institute for Balkan Studies / Serbian Academy of Sciences and Arts
- Frequency: Annually
- Open access: Yes
- License: CC-BY-NC-ND

Standard abbreviations
- ISO 4: Balcanica

Indexing
- ISSN: 0350-7653 (print); 2406-0801 (web)

Links
- Journal homepage

Balcanica is an annual peer-reviewed journal of the interdisciplinary Institute for Balkan Studies of the Serbian Academy of Sciences and Arts.

Balcanica covers a wide range of topics from prehistory and archaeology, cultural studies, art history, literature and anthropology to modern and contemporary history focusing on the Balkans from prehistoric times to modern age. In order to reach a broader scholarly audience, since 2006 (nº XXXVI), Balcanica has been published in English and French. The current editor-in-chief is Vojislav G. Pavlović.
