= Covering Islam =

1981 book by Edward Said

Covering Islam: How the Media and the Experts Determine How We See the Rest of the World
- Cover of the first edition
- Author: Edward Said
- Language: English
- Published: 1981

Covering Islam: How the Media and the Experts Determine How We See the Rest of the World is a 1981 book by Palestinian author Edward Said, in which he discusses how the Western media distorts the image of Islam. Said describes the book as the third and last in a series of books (the first two were Orientalism and The Question of Palestine) in which he analyzes the relations between the Islamic world, Arabs and East and West, France, Great Britain and the United States.

Covering Islam deals with issues during and after the Iranian hostage crisis, and how the Western media has speculated on the realities of Islamic life. Said questions the objectivity of the media, and discusses the relations between knowledge, power and the Western media.

== Synopsis ==
Said postulates that, if knowledge is power, those who control the modern Western media (visual and print) are most powerful because they are able to determine what people like or dislike, what they wear and how they wear it, and what they should know and must not know about themselves.

Human intellect enables a person to think, ponder, contemplate and question. Intellect is, according to Islam, what makes a person unique as an individual. A human, by nature, is a rational being, but the western media wants a person to be irrational—in the sense of accepting or agreeing to an idea without verifying, thinking about or questioning it. In other words, says Said, irrationalism means to let one person think and decide for another—to let one person control others.

The modern Western media, says Said, does not want people to know that in Islam both men and women are equal; that Islam is tough on crime and the causes of crime; that Islam is a religion of knowledge par excellence; that Islam is a religion of strong ethical principles and a firm moral code; that socially Islam stands for equality and brotherhood; that politically Islam stands for unity and humane governance; that economically Islam stands for justice and fairness; and that Islam is at once a profoundly spiritual and a very practical religion. Said claims that untruth and falsehood about Islam and the Muslim world are consistently propagated in the media, in the name of objectivity, liberalism, freedom, democracy and ‘progress’.
