= The Limits of Vision =

1986 novel by Robert Irwin

The Limits of Vision is a novel by Robert Irwin published in 1986.

== Plot summary ==
The Limits of Vision is a novel in which housewife Marcia wages a battle against dirt.

== Reception ==
Dave Langford reviewed The Limits of Vision for White Dwarf #77, and stated that "Concentrated, sinister and funny, this is a triumph of black humour. Well, off-black. As Marcia would point out, black shows up all the fluff and flakes of dead skin and. . . ."

== Reviews ==
- Review by Brian Stableford (1986) in Fantasy Review, September 1986
- Review by Maureen Porter (1986) in Vector 134
