= Robert Irwin (writer) =

British scholar and novelist (1946–2024)

- Born: Robert Graham Irwin; 23 August 1946; Guildford, England
- Died: 28 June 2024 (aged 77); London, England
- Education: University of Oxford
- Occupations: Scholar; novelist
- Notable work: The Arabian Nightmare (1983); For Lust of Knowing (2006); Memoirs of a Dervish (2011)

Robert Graham Irwin (23 August 1946 – 28 June 2024) was a British scholar and novelist. Notable among his scholarly works is For Lust of Knowing: The Orientalists and Their Enemies, a critique of Edward Said's concept of Orientalism.

== Biography ==
Robert Graham Irwin was born in Guildford on 23 August 1946. He attended Epsom College, read modern history at the University of Oxford, and did graduate research at the School of Oriental and African Studies (SOAS) under the supervision of Bernard Lewis. His thesis was on the Mamluk reconquest of the Crusader states, but he failed to complete it. During his studies, he converted to Islam and spent some time in a dervish monastery in Algeria. From 1972 he was a lecturer in medieval history at the University of St. Andrews. He gave up academic life in 1977 in order to write fiction, while continuing to lecture part-time at Oxford, Cambridge and SOAS. Irwin was a research associate at SOAS, and the Middle East editor of The Times Literary Supplement. He has published a history of Orientalism and was an acknowledged expert on The Arabian Nights.

Many of Irwin's novels focus on Arabic themes. This includes his first, the acclaimed dark fantasy novel The Arabian Nightmare, which was inspired by Jan Potocki's The Manuscript Found in Saragossa. Later novels would focus on diverse subjects, such as British Surrealism (Exquisite Corpse) and Satanism in Swinging London (Satan Wants Me). A character from Satan Wants Me, the Satanist Charlie Felton, has a cameo in the 1969 episode of the League of Extraordinary Gentlemen comic. Alan Moore, the comic's creator, has described Irwin as a "fantastic writer".

He was elected a Fellow of the Royal Society of Literature in 2001.

Irwin died in London on 28 June 2024, at the age of 77.

== Orientalism ==
In 2006, Irwin published For Lust of Knowing: The Orientalists and their Enemies, his critique of Edward Said's Orientalism (1978). Among various points, he maintains that Said focused his attention on the British and French in his critique of Orientalism, while it was German scholars who made the original contributions. He notes that Said linked the academic Orientalism in those countries with imperialist designs on the Middle East, yet, by the 19th and the early 20th centuries, it was more proper to regard Russia as an empire having imperialist designs on the Caucasus region and Central Asia. Irwin maintains that the issue of Russia's actual imperialist designs is avoided by Said. Another of Irwin's key points is that oriental scholarship, or "Orientalism", "owes more to Muslim scholarship than most Muslims realise."

Maya Jasanoff in the London Review of Books argued: "...Irwin's factual corrections, however salutary, do not so much knock down the theoretical claims of Orientalism as chip away at single bricks. They also do nothing to discount the fertility of Orientalism for other academics. The most thought-provoking works it has inspired have not blindly accepted Said's propositions, but have expanded and modified them."

== Published works ==
=== Fiction ===
- The Arabian Nightmare (Dedalus 1983)
- The Limits of Vision (Dedalus 1986)
- The Mysteries of Algiers (Dedalus 1988)
- Exquisite Corpse (Dedalus 1995)
- Prayer-Cushions of the Flesh (Dedalus 1997)
- Satan Wants Me (Dedalus 1999)
- Wonders Will Never Cease (Dedalus 2016)
- My Life is like a Fairy Tale (Dedalus 2019)
- The Runes Have Been Cast (Dedalus 2021)
- Tom's Version (Dedalus 2023)

=== Non-fiction ===
- The Middle East in the Middle Ages: the Early Mamluk Sultanate 1250–1382 (Croom Helm 1986)
- The Arabian Nights: A Companion (Allen Lane 1994)
- Islamic Art (Laurence King 1997)
- Night and Horses and the Desert: the Penguin Anthology of Classical Arabic Literature (Allen Lane 1999)
- The Alhambra (Profile Books, 2004).
- For Lust of Knowing: the Orientalists and their Enemies (Allen Lane, 2006). (US edition: Dangerous Knowledge: Orientalism and Its Discontents (Overlook Press, 2006)
- Camel (Reaktion Books 2010)
- Mamluks and Crusaders (Ashgate Variorum 2010)
- Visions of the Jinn; Illustrators of the Arabian Nights (The Arcadian Library 2010)
- Memoirs of a Dervish: Sufis, Mystics and the Sixties (Profile Books, 2011)
- Ibn Khaldun: An intellectual Biography. Princeton University Press. 2018. ISBN 9780691174662.
