= Maria Todorova =

Bulgarian historian (born 1949)

- Мария Тодорова
- Born: Maria Nikolaeva Todorova; 5 January 1949 (age 77); Sofia, Bulgaria
- Education: Sofia University
- Occupation: Historian
- Years active: 1977–present
- Notable work: Imagining the Balkans
- Father: Nikolai Todorov

Maria Nikolaeva Todorova (Bulgarian: Мария Николаева Тодорова; born 5 January 1949) is a Bulgarian historian who is best known for her influential book, Imagining the Balkans, in which she applies Edward Said's notion of Orientalism to the Balkans. She is the daughter of historian and politician Nikolai Todorov, who was the Speaker of the National Assembly of Bulgaria (July 1990 – 2 October 1991) and the acting Chairman (President) of Bulgaria in July 1990.

== Career ==
Professor Maria Todorova is currently the Edward William & Jane Marr Gutgsell Endowed Professor Emerita at the University of Illinois at Urbana–Champaign. She specializes in the history of the Balkans in the modern period. Her book Imagining the Balkans (1997) has been translated into fourteen languages, including German, Polish, Greek, Italian, Bulgarian, Turkish, and Albanian.

Todorova's current research revolves around problems of nationalism, especially the symbolism of nationalism, national memory and national heroes in Bulgaria and the Balkans. Between 2007 and 2010, she also led an international research team of scholars on the project Remembering Communism.

She studied history and English at the University of Sofia, and obtained her PhD in 1977. Maria Todorova was subsequently adjunct and visiting professor at various institutions, including Sabancı University in Istanbul and the University of Florida (where she was also professor). She was awarded the prestigious John Simon Guggenheim Fellowship in 2000. In 2006, Maria Todorova was awarded the degree of Doctor Honoris Causa of the European University Institute in Florence, Italy. In 2022, Maria Todorova was inducted into The American Academy of Arts and Sciences. Todorova also won the 2022 Distinguished Contributions to Slavic, East European, and Eurasian Studies Award from the Association for Slavic, East European, and Eurasian Studies (ASEEES) in recognition of her teaching, scholarship, service to the field, and position as "arguably the foremost historian of southeastern Europe in the world today."

In 2023, De Gruyter published a volume of collected essays edited by two of Todorova's former students: Re-Imagining the BalkansHow to Think and Teach a Region: Festschrift in Honor of Professor Maria N. Todorova.

== Balkanism ==
Todorova is well known for her work concerning the history of the Balkans. Her groundbreaking work, Imagining the Balkans deals with the region's inconsistent (but usually negative) image inside Western culture, as well as with the paradoxes of cultural reference and its assumptions. In it, she develops a theory of Balkanism or Nesting Balkanisms, similar to Edward Said's Orientalism and Milica Bakić-Hayden's Nesting Orientalisms. She has said of the book:

The central idea of Imagining the Balkans is that there is a discourse, which I term Balkanism, that creates a stereotype of the Balkans, and politics is significantly and organically intertwined with this discourse. When confronted with this idea, people may feel somewhat uneasy, especially on the political scene ... The most gratifying response to me came from a very good British journalist, Misha Glenny, who has written well and extensively on the Balkans. He said, 'You know, now that I look back, I have been guilty of Balkanism,' which was a really honest intellectual response.

== Selected works ==
Her publications include:

- Historians on History (in Bulgarian, Sofia, 1988), Selected Sources for Balkan History (in Bulgarian, Sofia, 1977)
- England, Russia, and the Tanzimat (in Russian, Moscow, 1983; in Bulgarian, Sofia, 1980)
- English Travelers' Accounts on the Balkans (16th-19th c.) (in Bulgarian, Sofia, 1987)
- Balkan Family Structure and the European Pattern: Demographic Developments in Ottoman Bulgaria, Central European University Press, 2006 [1993]
- Balkan Identities: Nation and Memory, Hurst, London & New York University Press, 2004
- Imagining the Balkans, New York: Oxford University Press, 2009 [1997], ISBN 978-9989-851-31-5, OCLC 34282740
- "The Mausoleum of Georgi Dimitrov as lieu de mémoire," The Journal of Modern History Vol. 78, No. 2, June 2006
- Bones of Contention: the Living Archive of Vasil Levski and the Making of Bulgaria's National Hero. Budapest: Central European University Press, 2009
- Postcommunist Nostalgia, Maria Todorova and Zsuzsa Gille (Eds.) Berghahn Books, 2010
- Remembering Communism: Genres of Representation. Social Science Research Council, 2010
- Post-Communist Nostalgia. Berghahn Books 2012, ISBN 978-0857456434.
- Remembering Communism: Private and Public Recollections of Lived Experience in Southeast Europe, (with Augusta Dimou and Stefan Troebst), CEU Press, 2014
- The Bulgarian case: Women’s issues or feminist issues? (2017) In Gender Politics and Post-Communism: Reflections from Eastern Europe and the Former Soviet Union (pp. 30–38). Taylor and Francis. https://doi.org/10.4324/9780429425776-4
- The Lost World of Socialists at Europe’s Margins: Imagining Utopia, 1870s–1920s. Bloomsbury Academic. https://doi.org/10.5040/9781350150362

Todorova has also edited volumes, and numerous articles and essays on social and cultural history, historical demography, and historiography of the Balkans in the 19th and 20th centuries. In 2017, she has been awarded an Honorary Doctor by Panteion University in Athens.
