= Prishtina Albanological Seminar =

Annual meeting of Albanologists in Prishtina

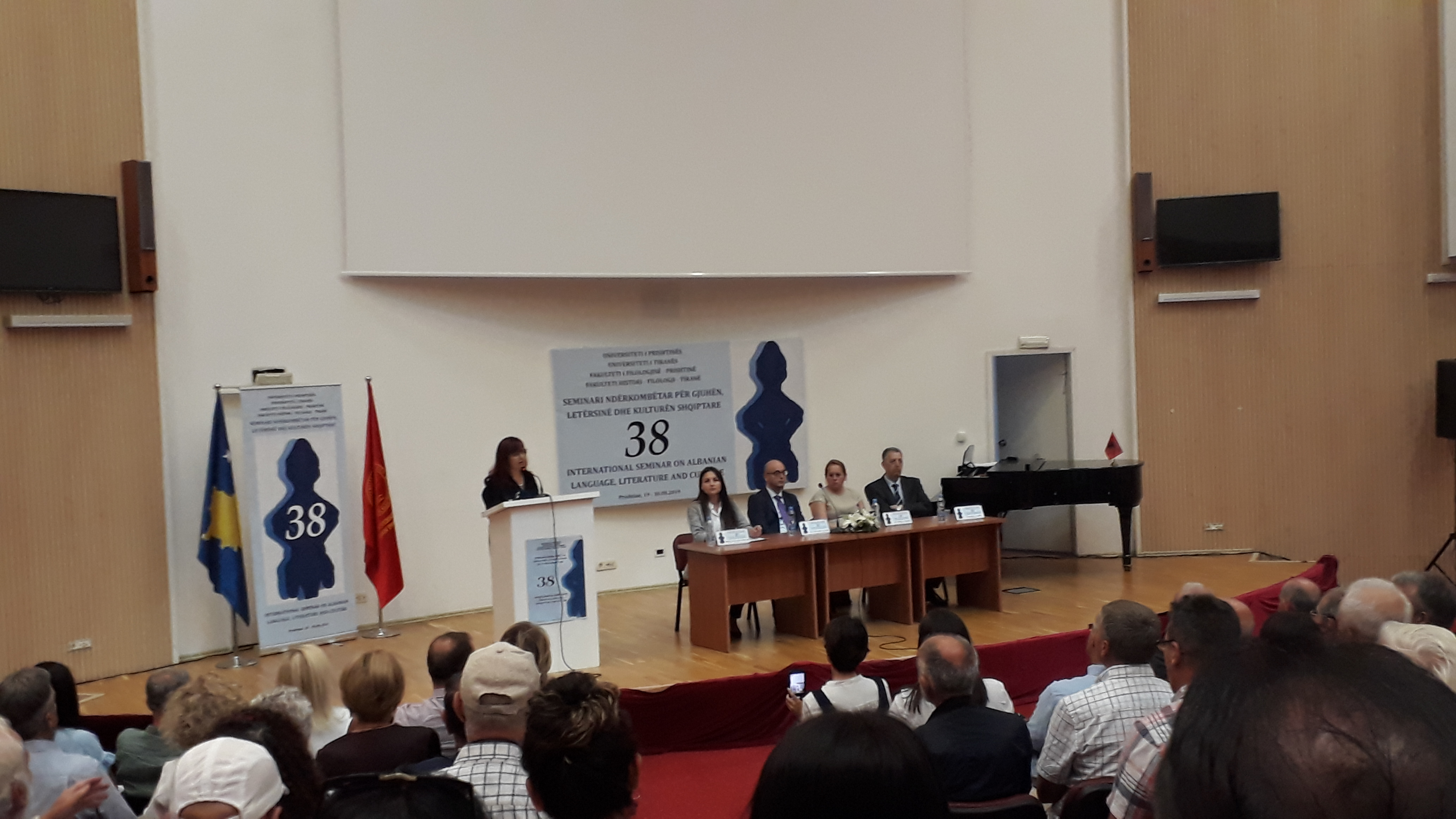
The Prishtina Albanological Seminar - 2019

The Prishtina Albanological Seminar (Albanian: Seminari Albanologjik i Prishtinës) also known as the Seminar on Albanian Culture for Foreigners (Albanian: Seminari i Kulturës Shqiptare për të Huaj) is an annual seminar that takes place in Prishtina, Kosovo. It was founded in 1974 within the Faculty of Philology (then part of the Faculty of Philosophy) at the University of Prishtina. The seminar is primarily organized for researchers and students interested in the Albanian language, literary works, and culture, as well as Albanology in general. The event has successfully attracted numerous Albanologists and scholars from around the globe who share a deep interest in Albanian language and culture. In recent years, this organization is named the International Seminar for the Albanian Language, Literature, and Culture.
