= Bulgarian Academy of Sciences and Arts =

Non-profit non-governmental organisation

- Established: 2004
- Location: Haskovo, Bulgaria
- Website: www.basa.bg

The Bulgarian Academy of Sciences and Arts (Bulgarian: Българска академия на науките и изкуствата, BANI) is a learned academy, registered in Haskovo, Bulgaria.

== History ==
The academy was founded in 2004 as non-profit-making non-governmental organisation.
