= Ratko Parežanin =

Writer and journalist of Serb ethnic origin

- Ратко Парежанин
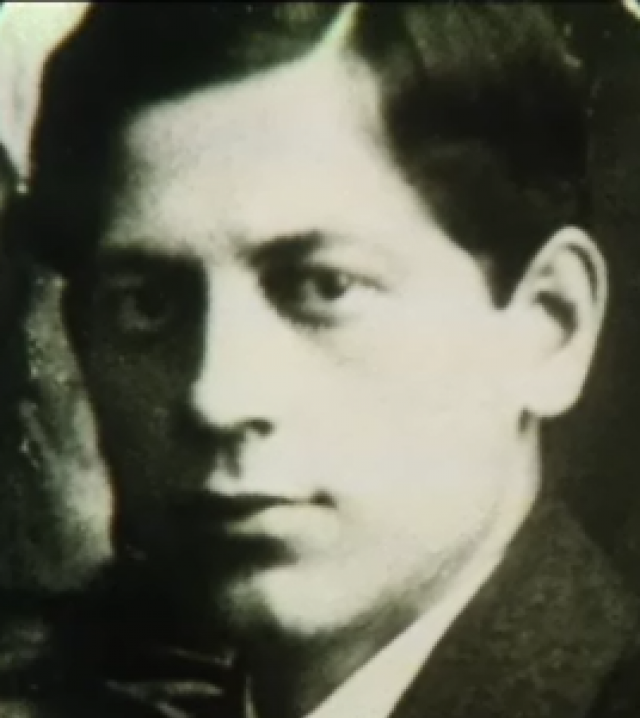
- Born: 24 February 1898; Konjic, Austria-Hungary (modern-day Bosnia and Herzegovina)
- Died: 20 May 1981 (aged 83); Munich, West Germany
- Occupations: Writer and journalist

Ratko Parežanin (Serbian: Ратко Парежанин) was Austrian, Yugoslav, British and West German writer and journalist of Serb ethnic origin.

== Family ==
The father of Ratko Parežanin, Vidak Parežanin, was Serb Orthodox priest hanged by the Austrians during the WWI. His mother Mileva gave birth to Ratko in Konjic, then in Austria-Hungary, on 24 February 1898.

== Early life ==
Parežanin was the youngest member of the Young Bosnia movement whose roommate in Belgrade in one period was Gavrilo Princip. After the Assassination of Ferdinand on 28 June 1914, Paržanin, who was 16 at that time, was arrested and put into Arad prison.

== Interwar period ==
In period between 1929 and 1933, Parežanin was an attaché for journalists at Yugoslav embassy in Wien. In 1934 Parežanin was responsible for scholarly profile of newly founded Institute for Balkan Studies. Parežanin was director of the Institute since its founding in 1934 until it was disbanded by German occupying authorities in 1941.

== During WWII ==
When German occupying authorities approved publishing of the new daily newspaper "Our Struggle" (Serbian: Наша Борба) on 25 August 1941, Parežanin was appointed as its editor.

=== Mission in Montenegro ===
In the end of 1944 Milan Nedić and Dimitrije Ljotić sent Parežanin and 30 members of his mission to visit Pavle Đurišić and convince him to retreat to Slovenia and to use the retreat of the German troops to do so. Parežanin left Belgrade on 4 October 1944. He travelled via Raška, Prizren and Skadar to reach Đurišić's headquarter in mid-October.

Đurišić refused Parežanins proposal because he believed that German troops will remain in Montenegro. For some time Parežanin and 32 members of his mission stayed with Đurišić in his headquarter in Donja Gorica near Podgorica. When in mid-November 1944 German troops began their retreat to Sarajevo via Kolašin, Prijepolje and Višegrad, Đurišićs Chetniks were concerned because they perceived German units as their support against the Communist forces.

On 27 November 1944 Đurišićs troops were informed about the order of Mihailović who requested that all Chetnik forces should concentrate on the line Višegrad - Foča - Goražde - Kalinovik in Bosnia and wait for Allied forces who were expected to penetrate into Bosnia after invading of the Adriatic coast. On the other hand, Parežanin continued to follow the plan set by Dimitrije Ljotić, to gather all national forces in Slovenia and with help of the Allies liberate Yugoslavia from Communist forces. That is why Parežanin insisted that Đurišić and his troops retreat to Slovenia. Germans refused the proposal of Đurišić to retreat together. At the end Đurišić decided to refuse proposal of Parežanin and decided to follow orders of Mihailović to retreat to Bosnia and wait for Allied forces with other Chetnik forces.

Parežanin and his mission stayed in Montenegro for more than two months. At the beginning January, when Parežanin realised that he failed to convince Đurišić to follow Ljotićs plan, he and members of his mission split with Đurišićs forces in Prijepolje and Parežanin and his mission reached Slovenia on 15 January 1945, after travelling through Sarajevo, Slavonski Brod and Zagreb. In Slovenia they joined forces of Ljotić and Nedić. According to some sources, Germans selected five groups of men among national forces, each with ten to forty members. They sent them to training for terrorist actions to Kaiserwald and Nojshterlitz. Parežanin was leader of one of the groups.

In March 1945, Đurišić regretted because he chose the wrong retreat route stating: "If I have followed advice of Parežanin I would already been in Slovenia with my people, probably even before Đujić.

== Bibliography ==
The bibliography of Ratko Parežanin includes:

- Drugi svetski rat i Dimitrije V. Ljotić (in Serbian). Iskra. 1971.
- Moja misija u Crnoj Gori. Iskra. 1974.
- Mlada Bosna i prvi svetski rat (in Serbian). Iskra. 1974.
- Za balkansko jedinstvo: Osnivanje, program i rad Balkanskog instituta u Beogradu (1934-1941) (in Serbian). Iskra. 1980.

== Sources ==
- Trbić, Vasilije; Drašković, Aleksandar; Ristevski, Stojanče (1996). Memoari: 1912-1918, 1941-1946. Kultura. ISBN 9788678010132.
- Subotić, Dragan (2001). Balkanske teme Ratka Parežanina: godine učenja i sazrevanja : 1910-1934. Inst. za Političke Studije.
- Božović, Branislav (1998). Beograd pod komesarskom upravom 1941 godine. In-t za savremenu istoriju.
- Pajović, Radoje; Željeznov, Dušan; Božović, Branislav (1987). Pavle Đurišić, Lovro Hacin, Juraj Špiler. Centar za informacije i publicitet. ISBN 978-86-7125-006-1.
- Latas, Branko (1979). Četnički pokret Draže Mihailovića: 1941-1945. Beogradski izdavačko-grafički zavod.
- Kovačević, Branislav (1993). Od Vezirovog do Zidanog mosta: tragična sudbina crnogorskih četnika u završnoj fazi rata: 1944-1945. Službeni list SRJ. ISBN 9788635501895.
- Milovanović, Nikola B. (1985). Draža Mihailović. Centar za informacije i publicitet.
- Pajović, Radoje (1977). Kontrarevolucija u Crnoj Gori: Četnički i federalistički pokret 1941–1945 (PDF) (in Serbo-Croatian). Cetinje, Yugoslavia: Obod.
