= Anouar Abdel-Malek =

Egyptian-French political scientist

- Born: 23 October 1924; Cairo, Egypt
- Died: 15 June 2012 (aged 87); Paris, France
- Education: Ain Shams University; Faculté des lettres de Paris
- Occupation: Political scientist

Anouar Abdel-Malek (Arabic: أنور عبد الملك), (23 October 1924 – 15 June 2012) was an Egyptian-French political scientist. He was a pan-Arabist and Marxist.

Born to a Coptic Christian family, Anouar Abdel-Malek gained a bachelor's degree in philosophy in 1954 from Ain Shams University before studying for a doctorate at the Sorbonne. He subsequently joined the CNRS, becoming head of research there in 1970.

== Works ==
- Égypte : société militaire, 1962. Translated by Charles Lam Markmann as Egypt: military society; the army regime, the left, and social change under Nasser, 1968.
- Anthologie de la littérature arabe contemporaine, 1964
- Idéologie et renaissance nationale, l'Égypte moderne, 1969
- La Pensée politique arabe contemporaine, 1970. Translated by Michael Pallis as Contemporary Arab political thought, 1983
- (ed.) Sociologie de l'impérialisme, 1971
- La dialectique sociale, 1972. Translated by Mike Gonzalez as Social dialectics, 2 vols., 1980.
- Nation and revolution, 1981
- (ed. with Miroslav Pečujlićand Gregory Blue) Science and technology in the transformation of the world, 1982
- (ed. with Ānisujjāmāna) Culture and thought in the transformation of the world, 1983.
