= For Lust of Knowing =

Book by Robert Irwin

For Lust of Knowing: The Orientalists and their Enemies
- Author: Robert Irwin
- Language: English
- Publisher: Penguin Books
- Publication date: 2006
- Publication place: United Kingdom
- Media type: Print (hardcover and paperback)
- Pages: 416 pp
- ISBN: 978-0-14-028923-7
- OCLC: 71807778

For Lust of Knowing: The Orientalists and their Enemies, published in the United States under the title Dangerous Knowledge: Orientalism and Its Discontents, is a 2006 non-fiction book by British historian Robert Irwin. The book is both a history of the academic discipline of Orientalism and an attack on Edward Said's 1978 book Orientalism, which he calls "malignant charlatanry, in which it is hard to distinguish honest mistakes from willful misrepresentations." The title of the British version of the book comes from the poem "The Golden Journey to Samarkand" by James Elroy Flecker.

== Synopsis ==
While For Lust of Knowing is a riposte to Said's Orientalism, much of the book is taken up with a general history of Orientalism as an academic discipline. Unlike Said's work, it does not examine fiction, painting or other art forms. It focuses mainly in the work of British, French, and German Orientalists and contrasts their different approaches and occasional idiosyncrasies. When Irwin does mention Said, it is usually to point out an error or inconsistency in Said's analysis. For example, one of the few Orientalists Said professes to admire is Louis Massignon. Irwin points out that Said "fail[ed] to note Massignon's anti-Semitism" and "his decidedly patronising attitude to Arabs", as well as Massignon's debt to Ernest Renan, one of the villains of Orientalism.

In the chapter that specifically focuses on Said's Orientalism, Irwin highlights Said's inconsistent melding of the work of Michel Foucault and Antonio Gramsci.

== Reception ==
Maya Jasanoff in the London Review of Books argued: "...Irwin's factual corrections, however salutary, do not so much knock down the theoretical claims of Orientalism as chip away at single bricks. They also do nothing to discount the fertility of Orientalism for other academics. The most thought-provoking works it has inspired have not blindly accepted Said's propositions, but have expanded and modified them."

British ambassador Oliver Miles, reviewing in The Guardian, praised the work for being "readable, learned, enthusiastic". As for the attacks on Orientalism, Miles states that while "Irwin scores some hits...[he] cannot quite pin Said down."

The Independent focused on its polemical nature, describing the work as a "petrol-bomb lobbed into the flames of dissent...a self-confessedly partisan document." The reviewer concluded that by the end of all of Irwin's arguments "the reader is left in no doubt that the original premise of Orientalism is highly flawed"; however, he notes that much of "orientalising tendencies" come not from the scholars upon whom Irwin focused, but the multitude of other opinion-makers like journalists and diplomats.

The New York Times complimented Irwin on the "lively, readable style", but noted that it could be difficult to follow for readers unfamiliar with the field. While calling the attack on Said "bracing", Irwin "makes abundantly clear...that "Orientalism" cannot really be refuted" because it is a political argument.

Amir Taheri, writing in Asharq Al-Awsat, listed a number of factual and editing errors that Irwin makes in the book, also noting a number of prominent Orientalists left unmentioned. Nevertheless, he found the book enjoyable to read, stating that to his knowledge, it represents "the most complete account of Orientalism from the emergence of its modern version in the 19th century to the present day." He adds that "Irwin’s account of the work done by the Orientalists is often convincing." He also questioned the need to respond to Said's work with such research, as Said was "more of a political militant than a scholar".

== Editions ==
=== United Kingdom ===
- For Lust of Knowing: The Orientalists and Their Enemies. Allen Lane. 2006. ISBN 978-0-7139-9415-5. (Hardcover)
- For Lust of Knowing: The Orientalists and Their Enemies. Penguin Books Ltd. 2007. ISBN 978-0-14-028923-7. (Paperback)

=== United States ===
- Dangerous Knowledge: Orientalism and Its Discontents. Overlook Hardcover. 2006. ISBN 978-1-58567-835-8. (Hardcover)
- Dangerous Knowledge: Orientalism and Its Discontents. Overlook TP. 2008. ISBN 978-1-59020-017-9. (Paperback)
