= International Association of South-East European Studies =

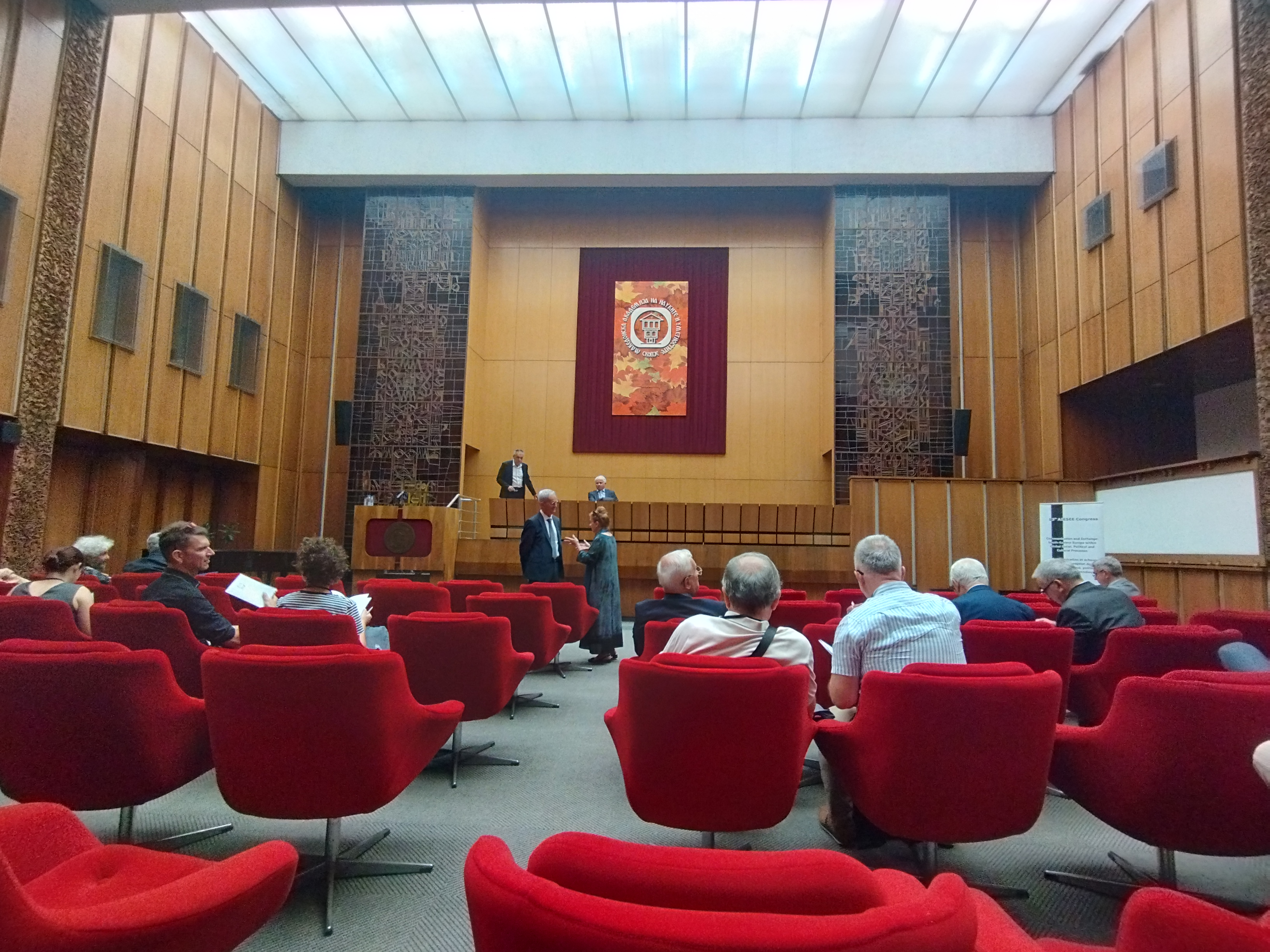
- Opening of the 13th Congress at the Macedonian Academy of Sciences and Arts in Skopje, North Macedonia (September 2025)
- Founded: 1963
- Founder: 6 Balkan countries' National UNESCO Commissions (Albania, Bulgaria, Greece, Romania, Turkey and Yugoslavia)
- Founded at: Bucharest Romanian People's Republic
- Official language: French (official language), English (working language)
- Website: www.aiesee.org

International Association of South-East European Studies, better known by its French language abbreviation AIESEE (from French: Association internationale d'études du Sud-Est européen) is an international scholarly, non-political and non-profit professional association focusing on Balkan studies and related fields of studies. The Association was established in Bucharest, capital of Romanian People's Republic, on 23 April 1963 and as of 2019 it brings together 25 member organizations in the field.

The organization was established during the first meeting of what was then 6 Balkan countries' National UNESCO Commissions (Albania, Bulgaria, Greece, Romania, Turkey and Yugoslavia) pushing for regional cooperation despite the Cold War divisions in the region. The founding members ambition was to promote international solidarity, commonalities between Balkan and Third World historical experiences, regional hybridity in links with Mediterranean, Near East and Slavic world, as well as critique of hegemonic representations of the region by scholars from the core countries.

== Congresses ==
- 1st Congress (Sofia, 1966)
- 2rd Congress (Athens, 1970)
- 3rd Congress (Bucharest, 1974)
- 4th Congress (Ankara, 1979)
- 5th Congress (Belgrade, 1984)
- 6th Congress (Sofia, 1989)
- 7th Congress (Thessaloniki, 1994)
- 8th Congress (Bucharest, 1999)
- 9th Congress (Tirana, 2004)
- 10th Congress (Paris, 2009)
- 11th Congress (Sofia, 2015)
- 12th Congress (Bucharest, 2019)
- 13th Congress (Skopje, 2025)

== See also ==
- Imagining the Balkans
- Balkan Universities Network
- National Commissions for UNESCO
