= Imagining the Balkans =

1997 book by Maria Todorova

- Author: Maria Todorova
- Language: English
- Publisher: Oxford University Press
- Publication date: 1997
- Publication place: United States
- ISBN: 0-19-508751-8
- Website: Imagining the Balkans; Updated Edition

Imagining the Balkans is a book by the Bulgarian academic Maria Todorova. The book was published by Oxford University Press in United States on May 22, 1997 (ISBN 0-19-508751-8), with the second and enlarged edition being published in 2009. It was described as author's magnum opus.

Privileging the study of texts and intertextuality, the author developed the concept of Balkanism inspired by Edward Said's Orientalism, yet the author also underlines how scholars of Orientalism essentialize the West as a homogeneous system. Todorova describes Balkanism not as a form of Orientalism but as an independent construction having to do with the representation of the Balkans. Her distinction is partially based on the "crucial" formal distinction between European colonialism abroad and subordination within. In her view, contrary to the Orient which serves as Europe's polar opposite, Balkan is Europe's "Other within" in an interstitial position of being neither here nor there. Also, she describes the Balkans as an actual place and space while Said's Orient is not defined in such a way.

The book was written during the Yugoslav Wars as a response to stigmatization of the region, stigmatization initiated from an Eurocentric position, that attributed to the Balkans a fatality of incomprehensible conflicts and barbarism, and therefore a non-European position.

The book was translated into languages of the region with Serbian and Bulgarian translation in 1999, Greek and Romanian in 2000, Slovenian and Macedonian in 2001, Turkish in 2003 and Albanian in 2006. German and Italian translations were published in 1999 and 2002. The French language translation was published in 2011 by the School for Advanced Studies in the Social Sciences.

== Original book cover description ==
"If the Balkans hadn't existed, they would have been invented" was the verdict of Hermann von Keyserling in his famous 1928 publication, Europe. This book traces the relationship between the reality and the invention. Based on a rich selection of travelogues, diplomatic accounts, academic surveys, journalism, and belles-lettres in many languages, Imagining the Balkans explores the ontology of the Balkans from the eighteenth century to the present day, uncovering the ways in which an insidious intellectual tradition was constructed, became mythologized, and is still being transmitted as discourse.

The author was raised in the Balkans, a region geographically inextricable from Europe. Culturally constructed as "the other," the Balkans have often served as a repository of negative characteristics upon which a positive image of the "European" has been built. With this work, Todorova offers a timely study of how geographic appellation was transformed into one of the most widespread pejorative designations in modern history.

== Maria Todorova on her book ==
Todorova has said of the book:

The central idea of Imagining the Balkans is that there is a discourse, which I term Balkanism, that creates a stereotype of the Balkans, and politics is significantly and organically intertwined with this discourse. When confronted with this idea, people may feel somewhat uneasy, especially on the political scene. ... The most gratifying response to me came from a very good British journalist, Misha Glenny, who has written well and extensively on the Balkans. He said, 'You know, now that I look back, I have been guilty of Balkanism,' which was a really honest intellectual response"

== Opinions ==
Corina Domnina Filipescu quotes the book in her thesis A postcolonial critique of the production of unequal power relations by the European Union. Hannes Grandits praises the book even after 20 years. Karl A. Roider Jr. compared the book with Institutes of the Christian Religion, noticed certain propinquity with postmodernist approaches and recommended it as a provocative, interesting and informative book. John R. Lampe described Todorova's book as largely successful and "superlative" response to outrageous stereotypes of the region with book's enduring contribution to academic understanding of early accounts of "the Balkans".

== See also ==
- International Association of South-East European Studies
