= Institute for Balkan Studies (Greece) =

Thessaloniki-based Balkanology institution

The Institute for Balkan Studies (Greek: Ίδρυμα Mελετών Xερσονήσου του Aίμου), known by the acronym IMXA, is a Thessaloniki-based institution specialized in Balkan studies. The institution's activities include researching aspects of the Balkans, publishing scholarly studies and periodicals, organising conferences and academic meetings, teaching Balkan languages, and Greek courses for non-speakers. It was founded in March 1953, as a branch of the Society for Macedonian Studies. It became a private legal entity in 1974, supported by the Ministry of Culture, Education and Religious Affairs. The governing board is presided by professor Kalliopi Koufa, while the director is professor Basil Kondis. It is co-funded by the ERDF (80%) and the Greek government.

== Publications ==
IMXA publishes the annual journal Balkan Studies ISSN 2241-1674, its main organ, since 1960, and also Valkanika Symmeikta since 1980.
