= Institute for Balkan Studies (Serbia) =

Serbian research institute

Institute for Balkan Studies Балканолошки институт САНУ
- Latin: Institutum Studiorum Balcanii
- Other name: Institut des Études balkaniques
- Established: 1969; 56 years ago
- Focus: Balkan studies
- Owner: Serbian Academy of Sciences and Arts
- Address: Knez Mihailova Street 35/IV
- Location: Belgrade, Serbia
- Website: balkaninstitut.com

The Institute for Balkan Studies of the Serbian Academy of Sciences and Arts (Serbian: Балканолошки институт САНУ, romanized: Balkanološki institut SANU) is a division of the Serbian Academy of Sciences and Arts that focuses on the historical, social, and anthropological study of the Balkans and its peoples. It is in the building of the Serbian Academy of Sciences and Arts in downtown Belgrade.

== History ==
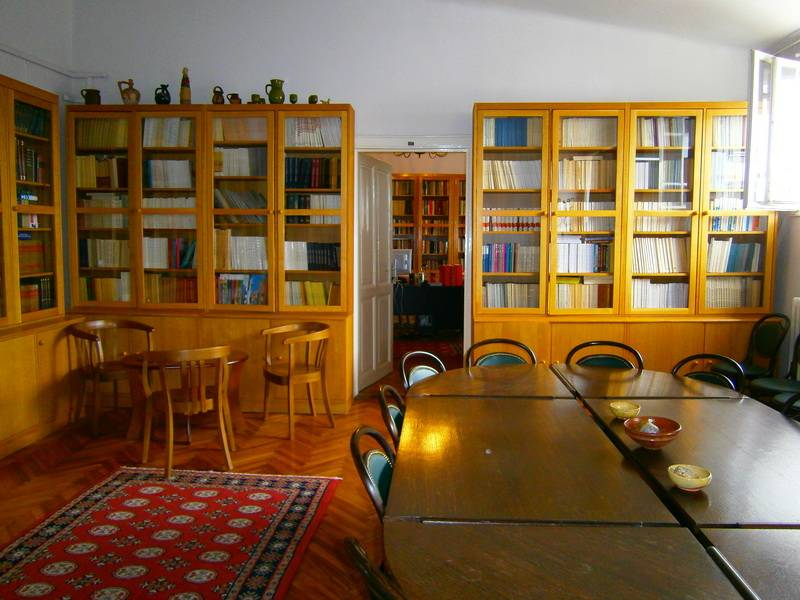
Institute of Balkan Studies reading room.

The origin of the Belgrade-based Institute of Balkan Studies goes back to the Institut des Études balkaniques founded at the initiative of King Aleksandar I Karađorđević in Belgrade in 1934 and funded by the king, while the organization of the Institute was entrusted to Ratko Parežanin and Svetislav Spanaćević. Aimed at promoting peaceful Balkan cooperation the Institut des Études balkaniques was the only one of its kind in the Balkans. The pre-war Institute published the Revue internationale des Études balkaniques, a prestigious scholarly journal written in French, English and German. Its contributors were the most prominent European experts on the Balkans, from various disciplines. The Institute was shut down by the Nazi occupation authorities in 1941.

Under the name Balkanološki institut SANU (Institute for Balkan Studies, SASA) it was re-established in 1969, with historian Dimitrije Đorđević, archaeologist Nikola Tasić and anthropologist Dragoslav Antonijević as his first research fellows. Thus, the Institute resumed with its scholarly pursuits under its present-day name and under the auspices of the Serbian Academy of Sciences and Arts. Among its members, past and current directors, the most prominent have been Radovan Samardžić, Nikola Tasić and Dušan T. Bataković.

The Institute's new research team was built so as to be able to cover the Balkans from prehistory to the modern age in a range of different fields of study, from archeology and ancient history to anthropology, linguistics and history. This multidisciplinary approach has remained its long-term orientation. The Institute for Balkan Studies has organized a number of domestic and international conferences promoting intellectual exchange and cooperation between scholarly communities at both the regional and European level.

== Present-day activities ==
The Institute for Balkan Studies declares itself to be committed to rigorous scholarly research aimed at furthering the understanding of an oft-stereotyped European region both in terms of its distinctiveness and of its inseparability from the rest of the world. In nearly forty years since its re-establishment the Institute has published more than one hundred monographic volumes in its Special Editions series (monographs, proceedings of scholarly conferences and edited volumes), as well as thirty-eight volumes of its annual Balcanica, published since 1970, mostly in the Serbian language.

In order to reach a broader scholarly audience Balcanica has been published in English and French since 2006 (nº XXXVI). Its current editor-in-chief, since 2005, is Dušan T. Bataković, Director of the Institute.

== List of recent publications in English and French language ==
- Čedomir Antić, Ralph Paget. A Diplomat in Serbia, Belgrade, Institute for Balkan Studies, Serbian Academy of Sciences and Arts, 2006.
- Kurban in the Balkans, Belgrade 2007, Biljana Sikimić ed., Institute for Balkan Studies, Serbian Academy of Sciences and Arts, Belgrade 2007.
- Čedomir Antić, Neutrality as Independence: Great Britain, Serbia and the Crimean War, Belgrade 2007.
- The Romance Balkans, Biljana Sikimić ed., Institute for Balkan Studies, Serbian Academy of Sciences and Arts, Belgrade 2008
- Bataković, Dušan T., ed. (2007). Kosovo and Metohija: Living in the Enclave (PDF). Belgrade: Institute for Balkan Studies.
- La Serbie et la France : une alliance atypique. Les relations politiques, économiques et culturelles, 1870–1940 Dušan T. Bataković (dir.), Institut des Etudes Balkaniques, Académie serbe des Sciences et des Arts, Belgrade 2010. 613.p. ISBN 978-86-7179-061-1
- Minorities in the Balkans. State Policy and Inter-Ethnic Relations (1804–2004) Dušan T. Bataković (ed.), Belgrade, Institute for Balkan Studies, Serbian Academy of Sciences and Arts, 2011, 364 p. ISBN 978-86-7179-068-0
- The Balkans in the Cold War, Balkan Federations, Cominform, Yugoslav-Soviet Conflict, Vojislav G. Pavlovic (ed.), Belgrade, Institute for Balkan Studies, Serbian Academy of Sciences and Arts, 2011, 347 p. ISBN 978-86-7179-073-4
- Italy's Balkan Strategies: 19th and 20th century, Vojislav G. Pavlović (ed.), Belgrade : Institute for Balkan Studies of the Serbian Academy of Sciences and Arts, 2014, 356 p. ISBN 978-86-7179-082-6
