= Catherine E. de Vries =

Dutch political scientist

- Known for: Euroscepticism and European integration; political behaviour; challenger parties
- Awards: European Research Council Consolidator Grant (2020–2025); Emerging Scholar Award, APSA (2014); Best Book in EU Studies, EUSA (2019); Young Global Leader, World Economic Forum (2013)

Academic background
- Education: University of Amsterdam (MA, 2003); Vrije Universiteit Amsterdam (PhD, 2007); University of North Carolina at Chapel Hill (coursework)
- Thesis: European Integration and National Elections (2007)
- Doctoral advisor: Liesbet Hooghe
- Other advisors: Gary Marks; Marco R. Steenbergen; Bernhard Wessels; Kees van Kersbergen
- Website: www.catherinedevries.eu

Catherine E. de Vries is a Dutch political scientist. She is Vice Dean and Professor of Political Science at the School of Politics, Economics and Global Affairs at IE University. She is known for her research on European politics, including political behaviour, comparative European politics and political economy. She is also a columnist for the Dutch newspaper Het Financieele Dagblad (Financial Times).

== Early life and education ==
Starting in June 2020, de Vries was the coordinator (along with Seth Jolly) of the EUROPOW (European Politics Online Workshop): weekly hour-long seminars about contemporary topics of related to European politics research and roundtables on current events.

In 2003, de Vries obtained her M. A. in Political Science at the University of Amsterdam. She was awarded her PhD in Political Science from VU University Amsterdam in 2007.

== Career ==
Since January 2020, De Vries has been an Associate Member at Nuffield College, University of Oxford.

Since 2023, de Vries has been part of the Centre for European Policy Studies/Heinrich Böll Foundation High-Level Group on Bolstering EU Democracy, chaired by Kalypso Nicolaïdis.

In 2024, de Vries was assigned the Generali Endowed Chair in European Policies.

In 2026, she moved to IE University, where she is currently Vice Dean and Professor of Political Science at the School of Politics, Economics and Global Affairs.

== Selected publications ==
- De Vries, Catherine E. & Sara B. Hobolt, Sven-Oliver Proksch & Jonathan Slapin (2021) Foundations of European Politics: A Comparative Approach. Oxford University Press.
- De Vries, Catherine E. & Sara B. Hobolt (2020) Political Entrepreneurship: The Rise of Challenger Parties in Europe. Princeton University Press.
- De Vries, Catherine E. (2018) Euroscepticism and the Future of European Integration. Oxford University Press.
