= Biomanipulation =

Biomanipulation is the deliberate alteration of an ecosystem by adding or removing species, especially predators.

== Aquatic ecosystems ==
Changing the fish population of bodies of water as a part of watershed management can facilitate desirable changes in aquatic ecosystems suffering from eutrophication characterized by domination by phytoplankton aiding ecosystem restoration, an application of restoration ecology. In ponds or lakes alternative stable conditions, one with high algae populations, little other plant life, and turbid water, another with low algae populations, a diverse plant population, and clear water, may exist. In addition to prevention of excess nutrients such as phosphorus and nitrates, removal of certain fish species adapted to turbid water may facilitate change from one steady state to the other, an application of dynamical systems theory. Fish species may be removed by means of poison, harvesting, or introduction of predatory species. As a different fish community will result from the process it will affect recreational and commercial fishermen whose cooperation or opposition is important.

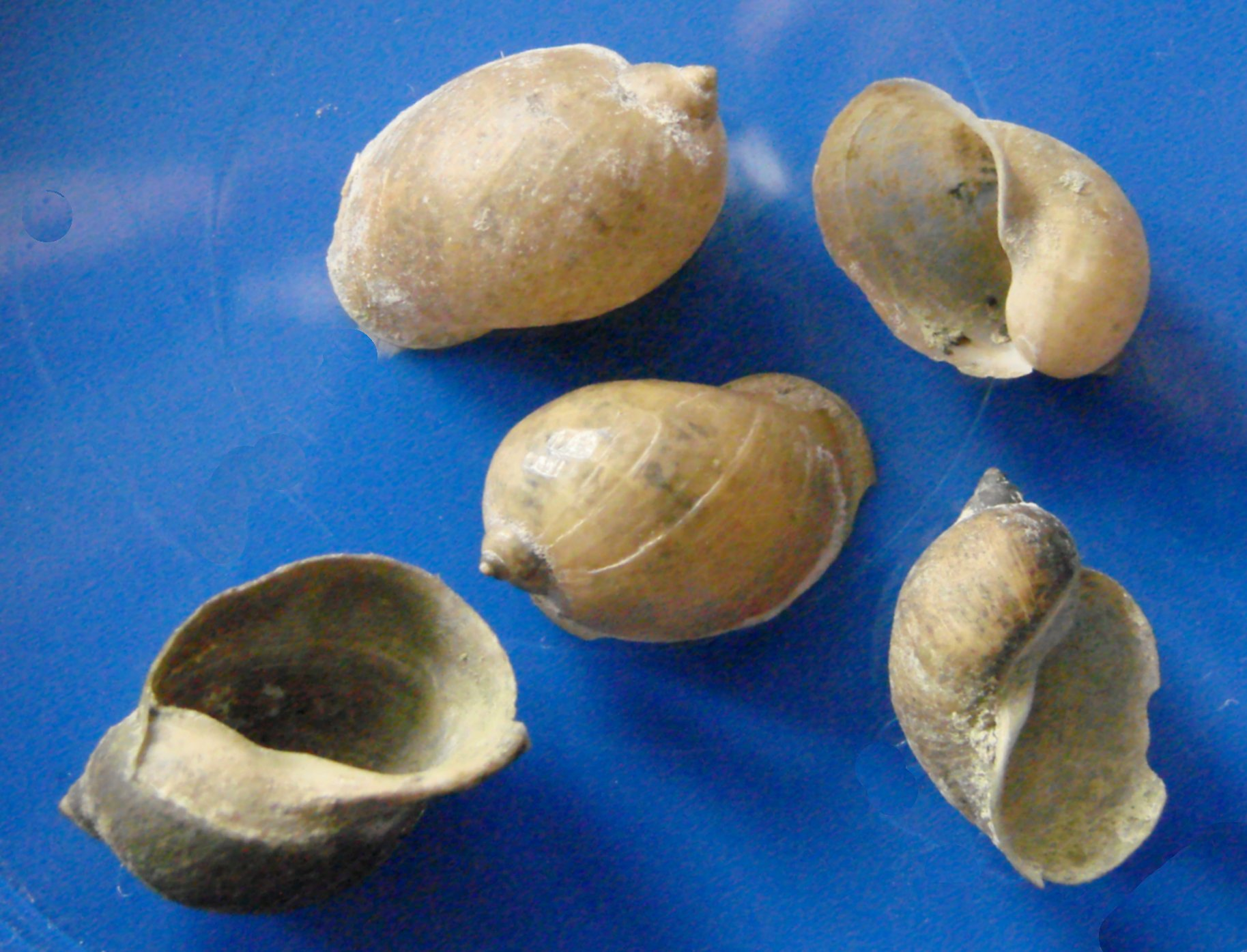
Radix peregra var. ovata

Lake Zwemlust, a hypertrophic pond used as a swimming pool in The Netherlands with an area of 1.5 hectares and an average depth of 1.5 meters, was treated in March 1987. The initial Secchi disk transparency was only 0.3 meters, less than the 1 meter maximum permitted for swimming pools in The Netherlands. In the first summer Secchi disk transparency increased to at least 2.5 meters, the maximum depth of the lake. The lake was drained and 1,500 kilograms of planktivorous and benthivorous fish such as common bream were removed by seining and electrofishing. The pond was stocked with 1500 northern pike fingerlings and some mature rudd whose offspring served as food for the pike. Willow branches, Nuphar lutea roots, and starts of Chara globularis were added as vegetation and shelter. Expenses were met by the local water authority which was compensated by increased patronage by swimmers. In the summer of the second year, 1988, there was considerable plant growth and, possibly due to lack of predation by carp or minnows, an explosion in the number of snails, including Radix peregra var. ovata, a host of Trichobilharzia ocellata which is the cause of schistosome dermatitis (swimmer's itch).

In addition to grazing by zooplankton the lush growth of macrophytes removed sufficient nutrients from the water to prevent algal bloom by phytoplanktons.

== See also ==
- Organisms involved in water purification

== External links and further reading ==
- Petr, T. (2000). "Interactions Between Fish and Aquatic Macrophytes in Inland waters: a review". FAO Fisheries Technical Paper (396): 51. ISBN 92-5-104453-8.
- Hansson, L.-A.; Brönmark, C. (2010). "Biomanipulation of Aquatic Ecosystem". In Likens, Gene E (ed.). Lake Ecosystem Ecology. Academic Press. ISBN 9780123820037.
- Ansari, Abid A. (2011). Eutrophication: Causes, Consequences and Control. Springer. p. 297. ISBN 9789048196258.
- Hoare, Dan; Phillips, Geoff; Perrow, Martin (March 2008). "Review of Biomanipulation". Norwich: Broads Authority.
- Meijer, Marie-Louise; de Boois, Ingeborg; Scheffer, Marten; Portielje, Rob; Hosper, Harry (August 1999). "Biomanipulation in shallow lakes in The Netherlands: an evaluation of 18 case studies" (PDF). Hydrobiologia. 408/409: 13–30. Bibcode:1999HyBio.408...13M. doi:10.1023/A:1017045518813. S2CID 45396812.
- Angeler, David G.; Chow-Fraser, Patricia; Hanson, Marka; Sanchez-Carrillo, Salvador; Zimmer, Kype D. (December 2003). "Biomanipulation: a useful tool for freshwater wetland mitigation?" (PDF). Freshwater Biology. 48 (12): 2203–2213. Bibcode:2003FrBio..48.2203A. doi:10.1046/j.1365-2427.2003.01156.x.
