= Cities for Climate Protection program =

The Cities for Climate Protection program (CCP) is one of three major global transnational municipal networks aimed at reducing urban greenhouse gas emissions. Established in 1990 by the International Union of Local Authorities and the United Nations Environment Programme, one of the largest global transnational networks, the International Council for Local Environment Initiatives (ICLEI), presented a framework to represent local government environmental concerns internationally. The ICLEI strives to ‘establish an active and committed municipal membership… that promotes environmental and sustainable development initiatives within…[a] framework of decentralised cooperation’. In 1993, subsequent to an ICLEI successful pilot scheme, the Urban CO_{2} Reduction Project, the CCP program was established during the post-Rio Earth Summit era. The CCP program illustrates itself within local climate policy, as a Transnational governance network.

== The Cities for Climate Protection program ==
Established in 1993, the CCP program houses more than 650 municipal governments representing over 30 participatory countries. The CCP program assumes that whilst single local government efforts to reduce greenhouse gas emissions (GHG) may be reasonably modest, by working together as a network of authoritative bodies, local authorities can significantly influence efforts to reduce GHG emissions. ). As areas of the world with the largest populations and most significant population growth, the world's cities populations reached an extortionate 3.2 billion in 2005, set to increase to a scintillating 5 billion by 2030. Thus indicating by representing 50% of the global population within cities in 2005, cities are a pivotal base point to raise the awareness and initiate action toward reducing GHG emissions. Local authorities of the CCP program ‘regulate, advise, and facilitate action by local communities and stakeholders…in addressing environmental impacts…of energy management, transport, and planning’.

ICLEI's initial pilot project, the Urban CO_{2} Reduction Project, brought together American, Canadian and European cities to develop a municipal planning framework to reduce GHG emissions and produce an energy management strategy, leading to the founding of the CCP program. As part of the figuring of the CCP program network, local authorities engaged with national and international governments, developing and implementing GHG emission reduction strategies, and strategies to protect the ability of the biological environment to remove CO_{2}. From the provision of the founding of the CCP program network, four main goals were stated: • ‘Re-enforce local commitments in reducing urban GHG emissions • Disseminating planning and management tools to facilitate the development of cost-effective CO_{2} reduction policies • Research and development of best practices, and development of model municipalities that lead by example • Enhancing national and international ties so that municipal-level actions are included in national action plans and international deliberations’

=== Becoming a CCP program member ===
Originally, the CCP program's aim was to enrol local authorities whose collective GHG emissions equated to 10% of the global emissions total. By 2001, 8% of this aim had been fulfilled by 549 member cities, with 2008 figures suggesting current member cities account for 15% of global GHG emissions. In becoming a CCP program member, local authorities must adopt a resolution or formal declaration intending to address the threats imposed by global climate change. Once part of the network program, member cities commit to completing five milestones: • ‘Conducting an energy and emission inventory and forecast • Establishing an emissions reduction target • Developing a local action plan to achieve the goal • Implementing policies and measures • Undertake processes of monitoring and verifying results’

The five milestones help local authorities understand how municipal decisions concern urban energy use, illustrating global climate change mitigation through reduced energy use. The founding body of the CCP, ICLEI, provides member cities with guidance, training and technical assistance to complete the five milestones. The member cities of the CCP program are what make it a transnational municipal network, structured through regional and national campaign offices.

== Decentralization of the CCP program ==
ICLEI initially operated a top-down governing approach to the CCP program, coordinated from the ICLEI's international base, Toronto. In an attempt to introduce a multi-level governance approach toward the delivery of the CCP program, national and regional campaigns were formed, decentralising the program. The UK, US, Australia, Canada, Finland, India, Mexico and South Africa amongst others saw national campaigns, whilst regional campaigns merged throughout Europe, Asia and Latin America. Financial resources are contributed significantly by nation-state governments especially in the US, Canada and Australia toward their national campaigns. Similarly, ICLEI Europe receives direct funding from the European Commission, creating resource opportunities for transnational networks through project and initiative competition. The decentralisation still demonstrates resilient transnational network governance but now operating on a multi-level governance scale.

== The CCP as a local climate policy ==
Stemming from membership, CCP cities publicly demonstrate their recognition of global climate change as a ‘legitimate local concern,’ committed to controlling the threats of local greenhouse gas emissions, immediately focusing the CCP program upon city local climate policy agendas. Problematically, many city governments do not take action on climate change as they see it as a ‘global issue,’ whereby local decision-makers should not be concerned. However, member CCP program municipal governments succeed in ‘localising’ global climate concerns, governing a global issue at a local policy scale. CCP cities adhere to linking the controlling of GHG emission policies with issues already implemented upon their agendas. Climate concerns can be integrated into local policy sectors representing economic development, urban and land-use planning, traffic, housing and tax. In getting global climate change issues within local policy, many CCP cities localise the policies that govern the controlling of GHG emissions, as opposed to the intricate problems of climate change. This way, more issues enter government local policy agendas through the delivery of preferred policy options as a means of solution to climate change problems already being addressed by the government. Local ‘hooks’ is a term often used in US cities to relate the concern of GHG emissions with local issues such as air quality. Such local issues provide the ‘hooks’ by which climate change issues are hung, prompting local governments to retain and address climate change as a localised issue. If climate concerns at the local level are to matter, and to become a success, more municipal governments must become members of the CCP program, allowing their actions to positively contribute to GHG emissions.

The CCP program is a resource that Municipal governments have drawn upon in advancing particular local energy or environmental policies with sizeable global climate consequences, to a manageable scale in which local governments should act and be concerned. The program in relation to local climate policy provides inspiration, recognition and legitimation surrounding the environmental responsibilities of local government and in linking such to existent local agendas. The CCP cities have negotiated, reiterated and sustained many actions concerning local climate protection, in stabilising urban GHG emission reductions.

== The CCP program as a transnational governance network ==
Transnational governance is distinct in that it involves both state and non-state actors, contributing differing sources and capacities of authority. As a network, they involve ‘regular interaction across national boundaries when at least one actor is a non-state agent or does not operate on behalf of a national government or intergovernmental organisation’. The CCP program operates within nation-states via national and regional campaigns, as well as cross boundaries between international nations, between state and non-state actors, fitting Risse-Kappen's transnational governance network definition. Transnational governance networks assemble information, knowledge and values objectifying ‘the integration of new conceptions of… environmental phenomena into every day worldwide views and practices’ of public and private actors. The CCP program is identified as a public transnational governance network, as opposed to a hybrid or private transnational network, as such networks are established by and for public actors. Public transnational governance networks are founded via ductile cooperation such as agreements of understanding, exemplified by the resolution or formal declaration imposed by a pending member of the CCP program, rather than formal sanctions of intergovernmental agreements from the state.

and are celebrated for their work in transnational governance networks in global governance for its importance of development in globalisation. The CCP program is the most influential example of this celebratory work along the climate scale, as a public transnational governance network, involving public authorities in governance across both local and global scales. The CCP program as a transnational governance network exemplifies how boundaries of formal intergovernmental diplomacy are over-reached, engaging in public authoritative steering in seeking to address the mitigation of GHG emissions, at a local scale. As a transnational governance network, the CCP program network is a crucial means in improving municipal performance in respect to climate change. The networks aid in facilitating the process by offering ways for members to contact each other, in circumstances that may involve a joint bid for climate change project funding, or for submitting bids individually.

=== CCP cities in maintaining their transnational governance network ===
Key to securing transnational governance network participation are CCP cities which see the program as a means of promoting their interests, values and norms regarding climate change at a local scale. In maintaining a valuable, worthwhile, and effective GHG emissions reduction governance network, member CCP cities must establish open connections within the network, creating solid network interactions. Member cities illustrating open connections toward the CCP program, through the active involvement of continual monitoring and reporting of energy use, and participation in CCP program workshops, often gain additional financial resources from the network. Alone, the production and exchange of information from CCP cities is insufficient in maintaining a transnational network. Forged on the basis of financial and political resources are offered to member cities by the CCP program, based on the formation of close network links, openly connected member cities receive legitimacy of their ideas, creation of knowledge for local climate protection and shared norms, rather than the reliance upon the dissemination of technical information actively sought upon by less connected CCP cities. In maintaining a significant connection as a CCP city within a transnational governance network, members must not exclusively rely upon the dissemination of information but rather build upon knowledge, norms and resources linked within the process of building and maintaining networks.

== Benefits and successes of the CCP Program as a transnational governance network ==
As a transnational governance network, joining as a CCP member city is a benefit to the city in itself. Advantages for CCP cities account for exchanges of experience, access to funding and political kudos, and the development of direct links between CCP member cities from the local to international level. CCP cities have benefited personally, able to voice concerns, interact and learn within a supportive environment, and gain international experience and access to financial resources whilst promoting interests within local government. ). In some cases, Leicester and Newcastle, UK, the CCP program has given enhanced political kudos, creating opportunities for matters of energy and climate mitigation strategies to rise on their local agendas. ). Initiatives undertaken by CCP cities have gained national and international recognition, proving to be a valued resource provided by the transnational governance network. Newcastle, New South Wales and Denver, US, were cities that already had climate change inventories on their local agendas before joining the CCP program network. Only by participating in the transnational governance network were their climate change ethoses and inventories reinforced through their membership. By offering itself up, the CCP program, as a transnational network has been successful in building local capacity, due to the political and financial resources obtained through close membership within the network. Individuals benefiting from this position have been able to allow climate change mitigation strategies to join in line with issues of local significance allowing for the need to responsibly tackle global issues at a local scale.

Crucially, while it is seen single local government action on reducing GHG emissions may be relatively ineffective, working together under a transnational governance network frame collectively, such as the CCP cities, can make an important contribution towards the reduction and mitigation of global climate change. An example of a CCP success story is Denver, US. After joining the CCP program, Denver's municipal government invested $1.6million into installing light-emitting diodes (LEDs) into all red traffic lights and ‘don’t walk’ signs across the city. The LEDs, having longer life spans and lower energy requirements, led to a $5million savings in energy use and maintenance for the city.

== Barriers toward CCP program local policy action ==
Three main institutional barriers exist in transforming CCP program political will into policy action; bureaucratic structure, administrative capacity and budgetary constraints. Bureaucratic structure negatively affects the workings of the CCP program, as there is often no institutional home for climate change policy making. Many municipal governments have specialised departments with specific mandates with little interaction between departments, posing problems for CCP municipal governments as to control GHG emissions requires collaborative efforts from departmental areas of waste-management, health, air quality, transport and land-use planning amongst others. Thus the CCP program requires municipal governments to institutionalise efforts to control GHG emissions, housing all issues under one roof of say an environmental department.

Lack of administrative capacity leaves many cities without the facilities to develop local policies and programmes for climate change mitigation, leaving it increasingly difficult and time-consuming to address climate change at the municipal level. Many US cities in particular are unable or unwilling to provide adequate resources to address this issue due to more pressing agenda issues, and many personnel lack the technical capacity to monitor and analyse GHG emissions due to highly complex processes and inadequate access to necessary data.

Budgetary constraints emerge through an unwillingness to invest financial resources into climate change mitigation strategies. Many city budgets constrain the flexibility of municipal government officials to invest in GHG reduction projects, viewing the issue as a luxury expenditure. It is not un-common in response however for CCP municipal governments to convince officials to invest in some GHG reduction technologies, with the argument money saved through mitigation strategies can be used for re-investment in further mitigation strategies.
