= Multi-level governance =

Vertical and horizontal spread of power

Multi-level (or multilevel) governance is a term used to describe the way power is spread vertically between levels of government and horizontally across multiple quasi-government and non-governmental organizations and actors. This situation develops because countries have multiple levels of government including local, regional, state, national or federal, and many other organisations with interests in policy decisions and outcomes. International governance operates based on multi-level governance principles. Multi-level governance can be distinguished from multi-level government which is when different levels of government share or transfer responsibility amongst each other. Whereas multi-level governance analyses the relationship of different state levels and interaction with different types of actors.'

== Origins and significance of the concept of multi-level governance ==
Multi-level governance is an approach in political science and public administration theory that originated from studies on European integration. Political scientists Liesbet Hooghe and Gary Marks developed the concept of multi-level governance in the early 1990s and have continuously been contributing to the research program in a series of articles (see Bibliography). Their theory resulted from the study of the new structures that were put in place by the EU (Maastricht Treaty) in 1992. Multi-level governance gives expression to the idea that multiple levels of authority interact within the global economy, and it shows how closely domestic and international authority are linked.

Multi-level governance' is a recent concept, having first entered the lexicon of political science around fifteen years ago as comparativists became re-acquainted with European integration and discovered that authority was shifting not only from central states up to Europe, but also down to subnational authorities. The first efforts to understand this were descriptive, spawning concepts that have generated an extensive literature. Multi-level, polycentric, and multi-layered governance emphasize the dispersion of decision making from the local to the global level. In recent years these concepts have cross-pollinated subfields of political science including European studies and decentralization, federalism and international organization, public policy (e.g. environmental policy, health policy) and public-private governance, local governance and transnational governance.

The authors of a recent survey of the literature on the structure of government conclude that 'We attribute many of the recent "cutting-edge" theoretical contributions in political science to studies of "multi-level governance"’ and they note that although students of federalism 'considered the current subject matter of their field to be based on well-defined, well rooted and broadly accepted ideas, they were nevertheless open to a new flowering of federal theory as a result of fertilization by these new MLG theoretical developments'. However, there is nothing entirely new under the sun. Though scarcely recognized at the time, this research revives a rich tradition in political science represented by Karl Deutsch (1966) on the effect of societal transactions on government structure, Robert Dahl (1973) on the virtues and vices of multilevel democracy, and Stein Rokkan (1983) on identity and territorial politics.

== Application of the concept ==
=== Multi-level governance and the European Union ===
The study of the European Union has been characterized by two different theoretical phases. The first phase was dominated by studies from the field of international relations; in the second phase these studies were revised and insights from among others, public policy were added. The most straightforward way of understanding this theoretical shift is to see it as a move away from treating the EU as an international organisation similar to others (e.g. NATO) to seeing it as something unique among international organisations. The uniqueness of the EU relates both to the nature and to the extent of its development. This means that in some areas of activity the EU displays more properties related to national political systems than to those of international organisations.

The theory of multi-level governance belongs to the second phase. Multi-level governance characterizes the changing relationships between actors situated at different territorial levels, both from the public and the private sectors. The multi-level governance theory crosses the traditionally separate domains of domestic and international politics and highlights the increasingly fading distinction between these domains in the context of European integration. Multi-level governance was first developed from a study of EU policy and then applied to EU decision-making more generally. An early explanation referred to multi-level governance as a system of continuous negotiation among nested governments at several territorial tiers and described how supranational, national, regional, and local governments are enmeshed in territorially overarching policy networks. The theory emphasized both the increasingly frequent and complex interactions between governmental actors and the increasingly important dimension of non-state actors that are mobilized in cohesion policy-making and in the EU policy more generally. As such, multi-level governance raised new and important questions about the role, power and authority of states.

The European Union can be characterised by a mixture of intergovernmental cooperation between sovereign states codified through a succession of major Treaties, negotiated, agreed upon and signed by member states. These treaties are the primary legal basis giving rise to the much wider reaching process of supranational integration as they contain within them the provisions for their implementation. These legislative-legal instruments: Regulations, Directives, Decisions, Recommendations and Opinions constitute the mechanisms through which the principles of integration stipulated in the treaties are, in practice and over time, applied, disputed and enforced.

Multi-level governance within the EU is understood as respecting competences, sharing responsibilities and cooperating between the various levels of governance: the EU, the Member States and the regional and local authorities. In this context, it refers to the principle of subsidiarity, which places decisions as close as possible to the citizens and ensures that that action at Union level is justified in light of the possibilities available at national, regional or local level. In practice Multilevel Governance within the EU is about participation and coordination between all levels of government both in the decision-making process and in the implementation or evaluation of European policies.

The combination of communal decision-making with the wide area of policy areas results in a deep entanglement of the member states' national policy levels with the European policy level. This entanglement is one of the basic principles of the multi-level governance theory. The multi-level governance theory describes the European Union as a political system with interconnected institutions that exist at multiple levels and that have unique policy features. The European Union is a political system with a European layer (European Commission, European Council and European Parliament), a national layer and a regional layer. These layers interact with each other in two ways: first, across different levels of government (vertical dimension) and second, with other relevant actors within the same level (horizontal dimension).

Concerning with the changes of the institutional design of the European Union, the current model governance has been shaped as a setup of constraints upon political margin of discretion, applying the central tenet of ordoliberalism with the aim to use strong rules in order to reduce the discretionary exercise of powers by institutions so as to avoid an arbitrary use of them. This principle has achieved an extreme effect at the European level, that one not to avoid arbitrary use of political powers but to keep political responsibility and participation out of the decision-making process. As Laruffa concludes: "It is quite clear that such a model of governance, which is made only by rules without any role for a democratic policy-making process, imposes a de facto limit to on the political rights of the European citizens. This means that there is a control exercised by rules over the European citizens rather than a control by the European citizens over rules and policies."

The European Union: Multilevel Governance in Practice

Within the European Union nearly 95,000 local and regional authorities currently have significant powers in key sectors such as education, the environment, economic development, town and country planning, transport, public services and social policies. These local and regional authorities implement nearly 70% of EU legislation. They help ensure the exercise of European democracy and citizenship. Special rights and competences for regions, cities and communities are supposed to enable and preserve diversity of governance at local and regional level. By thinking beyond traditional EU – Member States relations the EU multi-level governance concept further strengthens regional and transnational cooperation. In a broader sense, this concept also includes the participation of non-state players like economic and social partners and civil society in the decision-making process of all levels of governance (thus taking up the vertical and horizontal dimensions of multilevel governance).

The Treaty of Lisbon as an important step towards Multilevel Governance

The Treaty of Lisbon represents an important step towards institutional recognition of multi-level governance in the way the European Union operates. It strengthens the competences and influence of local and regional authorities in the Community decision-making process giving roles to national (and regional) parliaments and the Committee of the Regions and enshrines the territorial dimension of the European Union, notably territorial cohesion as part of the process of European integration. The Committee of the Regions has established a system to monitor the compliance with the subsidiarity thorough the whole EU policy and law making process.

Multilevel governance within the EU as an ongoing process

Nevertheless, multi-level governance within the EU is a dynamic and ongoing process. On 16 June 2009 the Committee of the Regions adopted a White Paper on multi-level governance which recommended specific mechanisms and instruments for stimulating all stages of the European decision-making process. This document, together with the follow-up opinion "Building a European culture of Multilevel Governance" affirmed the committee's political commitment to Multi-level Governance, proposing a first political project for Building Europe in partnership. As a follow-up to the 2009 White paper on Multi-level Governance, the Committee developed a "Scoreboard on Multi-level Governance" to monitor on a yearly basis the development of multi-level governance at European Union level.

The Charter for Multi-level Governance in Europe

On 3 April 2014 the Committee of the Regions adopted a Charter for Multi-level Governance calling public authorities of all levels of governance to use and promote multi-level governance in their future undertakings. The Charter is open for signature to:

• all European Union local and regional authorities;

• European and national associations of local and regional authorities, as well as local and regional authorities' network are invited to officially commit to multilevel governance principles, giving the Charter their formal support;

• National and European political figures wishing to back up the Charter are also invited to declare their support

=== Multi-level governance beyond the European Union ===
The point of departure for multi-level governance was Europe, but recent books and articles have dealt with the dispersion of authority away from central states in Latin America, Asia, and North America. Decentralization has been at least as marked in Latin America as in Europe over the past two decades, and several Asian countries have decentralized in the past decade. Dispersion of authority above the national state is most evident in the EU, but it is not sui generis. A recent survey counts 32 regional IGOs pooling authority over quite wide areas of policy and which cover all but a handful of states in the world today. The number of governmental and non-governmental international organizations has increased markedly over the past two decades, as has their scope, range and intrusiveness. Crossborder interdependence – from migration to climate change to terrorism – has stimulated regional organization in many parts of the world.

== Vertical and horizontal dimension of multi-level governance ==
The "vertical" dimension refers to the linkages between higher and lower levels of government, including their institutional, financial, and informational aspects. Here, local capacity building and incentives for effectiveness of sub national levels of government are crucial issues for improving the quality and coherence of public policy.

The "horizontal" dimension refers to co-operation arrangements between regions or between municipalities. These agreements are increasingly common as a means by which to improve the effectiveness of local public service delivery and implementation of development strategies.

== Consequences and practical relevance of multi-level governance ==
There has been an intensification of research on the consequences as well as the character of multi-level governance. The concept was developed as a tool of pure research, but it now motivates policy makers. From the late 1990s the European Commission began to refer to its own mission as one of achieving multilevel governance, especially in cohesion policy. In 2001, the Commission set up a committee on multilevel governance to contribute to its White Paper on governance. José Manuel Barroso, President of the European Commission, claims that 'the multilevel system of governance on which our European regional policy is based provides a key boost to the Union's competitive edge' and that, in the current economic crisis, 'multilevel governance must be a priority'. In an October 2008 resolution, the European Parliament called on the member states 'to develop as quickly as possible the practical measures set out in the First Action Programme . . . with a view to strengthening multilevel governance'. In 2009, 344 representatives of elected regional and local authorities across the EU approved a resolution on a 'European Union Charter for Multilevel Governance', which would bring localities and regions into European democratic decision making.

Several political parties including the European Peoples Party have taken up this theme. The European Peoples Party which represents Christian democratic parties in the European Parliament recently stated that, 'multilevel governance should be one of the guiding principles of the EU, an integral part of any European strategy or policy where local and regional authorities are widely implicated, and monitored closely to ensure that it is indeed being put into practice on the ground'.

International organizations have also taken positions on the issue. In 2009, the United Nations Development Programme released a report, 'Delivering Human Security through Multilevel Governance', which argued that 'the two-level approach to international relations . . . is being replaced by a much more complex multilevel system of governance that also involves local, sub-national providers of public goods as well as regional governance actors acting at a supranational but not a global level'. The World Bank has commissioned a series of studies examining multilevel governance; the United Nations has a research and training institute on comparative regional integration that studies 'multilevel regulatory processes and the relations between sub- and supra-national regional governance', and the OECD has created a directorate on multilevel governance.

However, the consequences of multilevel governance are debated. In the eyes of its detractors, multilevel governance exacerbates corruption (Treisman 2000), leads to gridlock (Scharpf 2007), engenders moral hazard (Rodden 2006), constrains redistribution (Obinger, Castles, Leibfried 2005), obfuscates accountability (Peters & Pierre 2004), and wastes money (Berry 2009). Research on both causes and consequences of multi-level governance is ongoing and more and more information about the subnational as well as the international dimension of multi-level governance is available in the context of larger data sets.

=== Multi-level governance of climate change in cities ===
Global climate change is contributed to by increasing levels of greenhouse gas emissions from the decisions and activities of individuals and organisations at local, regional, national and international levels. Cities are suggested to contribute up to 75% of global carbon dioxide emissions, reflecting the increasing proportions of global populations living and working in cities. Tackling climate change is an extensive, time-consuming and costly task that cannot be achieved solely through policy implementation and regulation from central governments and bodies alone. It has become increasingly clear that nation-states will be unable to commit to and meet international targets and agreements for offsetting climate change without engaging with the activity of sub-national and local action. This suggests the importance of multi-level governance of climate change within cities.

Forms of governance at multi-levels have taken off increasingly at the local scale, building upon the notion of 'think global, act local', in cities in particular. Greenhouse gas (GHG) emissions stem from certain activities that originate from specific places, bringing about thought that the local scale is the most appropriate political scale to produce necessary offsets in emissions. Cities are exemplary of such specific places in which local governance action can and will help reduce GHG emissions. The levels of governance authority handed down to local governments within cities has been perceived to out-do policy goals within the national and international arena, with some local governments taking on their own initiatives for tackling urban climate change. This sets an important stance to which the local scale of multi-level governance is important for tackling global climate change within the urban arena.

Four distinct modes of governance exist within the dynamics of climate change in cities. Each stems from the local level with the ability of being implemented on multi-scales to mitigate and adapt to urban climate change. Self-governing is the capacity of local governments to govern its own activities such as improving energy efficiency within a designated city, without the burdening pressure to meet targets of increased energy efficiencies set by national governments. A form of self-governing within multi-level systems is horizontal collaboration where cities may collaborate with regions demonstrating multi-levels of governance to tackle urban climate change, imperative to the success of city climate change policy. Governing through enabling is the co-ordination and facilitation of partnerships with private organisations by the local government. National governments also implement this mode of governance to implement policy and action within cities. Governing through provision, a form of vertical collaboration along with governing through enabling, applies itself to the multi-levels of governance. Climate change in cities is tackled here through the shaping of and delivery of services and resources, with additional support aided to local governments from regional and national authorities. Lastly, another form of vertical collaboration, is governing through regulation. Such regulation characterises traditional forms of authoritative governance, exemplifying local to nation-state relations, almost covering the entirety of the multi-level governance scale.

=== Subnational integration of climate actions ===
Within the various initiatives of the Low Emission Development Strategies Global Partnership (LEDS GP), the thematic working group on Subnational Integration (SNI-WG) was created in 2013 to support learning and facilitate collaboration between national and subnational governments for accelerated effective climate actions. The SNI-WG realizes several activities at global and regional levels including organizing panels at multiple regional and global forums, hosting peer-learning discussions, publishing reports and case studies, along with facilitating technical workshops, webinars and providing advisory Remote Expert Assistance on LEDS (REAL) support upon request. This process has generated observations, feedback and insights on the potential of the vertical integration and coordination of subnational climate actions to accelerate and scale-up both local and global emission reductions. Improving coordination and integration between the different levels of authority in a country is critical in determining both national and global capacity to govern climate change. City and subnational governments require support from the national government, and vice versa, in order to design and implement intersectoral policies and actions for domestic decarbonization pathways.

Multilevel governance theory and empirical evidence demonstrate that the coordination and vertical integration of climate actions can:

- Help alleviate domestic political constraints.
- Raise national government ambitions for more aggressive Intended Nationally Determined Contributions (INDCs) and GHG mitigation commitments.
- Scale up, as well as unlock, additional and new mitigation opportunities at the subnational level.
- Accelerate the effective implementation of national targets, strategies and development priorities by "localizing" them. This can also provide opportunities for "bundled approaches" and increasing "co-benefits" by linking local priorities with diverse development objectives Improve the consistency of sub-national and national climate data sets; strengthening MRV.
- Create a more bankable "low-risk" environment for infrastructure finance and private sector investments.
- Enable safe learning and strengthen domestic institutions.
- Address recognized challenges and limits to sub-national non-state actor (NSA) climate actions.
- Expand and accelerate the flow of international public and private climate finance to cities, urban infrastructure and local priorities.
- Help address some of the persistent collective action challenges to multilateral climate agreements.

==== Cities for Climate Protection program ====
The Cities for Climate Protection (CCP) program is one example of multi-level governance of climate change. Roles and responsibilities are shared within different levels of governance, from state actors to non-state actors (Betsill & Bulkeley, 2006). Membership consists of 40 large cities worldwide (Large Cities Climate Leadership Group), with local governments often working in close connection with national governments. However, the CCP can overlook the activity of nation-states giving local governments the opportunity to amend positions of policy implementation and regulation for offsetting urban climate change, which may be of a controversial nature to national governments. Thus illustrating even though climate change in cities can be addressed and governed at local, regional, national and international levels, it does not always follow a hierarchical order.

== Criticism on multi-level governance theory ==
Many of the problems associated with multi-level governance revolve around the notion of levels. The very idea of levels and levels of analysis is imbued with hierarchical implications. However, different levels or social spaces often interact or cut across with one another in complex ways that are not strictly hierarchical. To what extent can 'levels' be identified at all? The notion that international bodies constitute a discrete level of authority and governance is contestable. International regulatory networks may not be separate sources of authority but instead represent the reconstitution of state authority and the pursuit of state-level governance by other means. While territorial levels make sense when we are referring to public forms of authority, they seem less compatible with private and market forms of authority.

Another criticism on the theory of multi-level governance is that it's not really a proper theory, rather that it is an approach. The main difference between multi-level governance and other theories of integration is that it gets rid of the continuum or grey area between intergovernmentalism and supranationalism and leaves in its place a descriptive structure. This theory does not address the sovereignty of states directly, but instead simply says that a multi-level structure is being created by subnational and supranational actors. One of the main questions of integration theory, namely, the transfer of loyalty and sovereignty between national and supranational entities and the future of this relationship in the EU is not specifically addressed in this theory.

The identification of partial political measures and general macroeconomics is divided on diverse decisional levels. National governments maintain an important decisional role but the control unlocalizes at supranational level. Individual national sovereignty is dilated in this decisional process and the supranational institutions have an autonomic role.

While there is a growing body of work on multi-level government and on local government of immigration integration, we still lack a systematic discussion of the role and position of non-state actors in the negotiation of responses to immigrant integration between different governmental levels and on the local level. The gap in multi-level governance research is that there is no systematic study of the role of non-state actors in multi-level governance.

== Arguments for multi-level governance ==
=== Security ===
The use of security as a means of instituting ideals of democracy. The shift to a multi-level governance perspective of enforcing the ideals prevents one nation from imposing its personal agenda or perception of what these ideals entail. Additionally, the use of supranational judgement creates a uniformity for the international portrayal and enforcement of democratic principles. The utilization of multi-level security governance allows for a pooling of resources to manage this enforcement, while still allowing States to act autonomously. The supranational level merely acts as a medium for allowing the promotion of mutually beneficial security. With the rise of transnational threats, a method for ensuring international security without the reliance on a single policing nation is required. Multi-level governance provides functional means of dealing with the deficiencies of merely national actors dealing with transnational issues on the international stage.

=== Economic Interdependence ===
The preliminary notion of the European Union was the European Coal and Steel Community. The union was between the nations of France, Belgium, Italy, Netherlands, Luxembourg, and West Germany. Striving for the concept of European peace the nations sought to bind the nations through economic interdependence. Coming about as a reaction to World War II, the ECSC created an economic tie for previously independent nations. It provided the European peace the nations sought, and would evolve into the European Union seen today. It was not a new concept as trade has historically been viewed as a catalyst for peace between nations. Creating multi-level governance is shown to create the necessary ties for fostering economic interdependence to a greater degree than mere trade between nations. The linking of nations through a sharing of capital creates an adhesiveness that deters the escalation of political conflict from reaching a state of war. On the international stage, political conflict leads to war as a result of perception of potential gains being larger than the opportunity costs. Interdependence created by multi-level governance is shown to greatly reduce the probability of war by increasing the opportunity costs. The increase in opportunity cost to war can be viewed from even the economic ties perspective. It is seen by noting that economic ties between participatory nations makes the cost of disruption to the system through the escalation of the political sphere towards war illogical.

=== Efficiency ===
Multi-level government has shown to increase efficiency of governance by creating an agreed upon standard for the implementation and execution of policies. To elaborate, the establishment of a supranational institution can be used to set standards for the way cooperating nations run their environmental, industrial, and safety policies. A key factor for multi-level governance is the terms the national actors agree to when forming the supranational institution as they will give certain decision-making processes to the higher level, and agree to abide by the outcome. Nations consent to the terms as they face a common issue of international policy that has to deal with collective-action problems making it nonsensical to attend to by themselves. Agreements between nations to form a multi-level government creates an efficiency gain that allows them to all share in the positive benefit.

== See also ==
- Environmental governance – Concept in political ecology and environmental policy
- Indirect election – Type of election
- Network governance – Organizational form
- System of people's congress – Form of government in the People's Republic of China

== Bibliography ==
- Acharya, Amitav, and A. I. Johnston eds. (2007). Crafting Cooperation: Regional International Institutions in Comparative Perspective. Cambridge: Cambridge University Press.
- Baker, Andrew, David Hudson, and Richard Woodward (2005). Governing Financial Globalization: International political economy and multi-level governance. Abingdon, Oxon: Routledge/Ripe.
- Berry, C. (2009). Imperfect Union: Representation and Taxation in Multilevel Governments. Cambridge: Cambridge University Press.
- Bertrand, Jacques and A. Laliberte eds. (2010). Multination States in Asia: Accommodation or Resistance. Cambridge: Cambridge University Press.
- Bird, Richard M. and F. Vaillancourt eds.( 2008). Fiscal Decentralization in Developing Countries. Cambridge: Cambridge University Press.
- Brondizio, Eduardo S.; Ostrom, E.; Young, O. R. (2009). "Connectivity and the Governance of Multilevel Social-Ecological Systems: The Role of Social Capital". Annual Review of Environment and Resources. 34: 253–278. doi:10.1146/annurev.environ.020708.100707.
- Dahl, Robert A., and Edward Tufte (1973). Size and Democracy. Stanford: Stanford University Press.
- Deutsch, Karl W. (1966). Nationalism and Social Communication. Cambridge: MIT Press.
- Eaton, Kent (2008). "Federalism in Europe and Latin America: Conceptualization, Causes, and Consequences" (PDF). World Politics. 60 (4): 665–98. doi:10.1353/wp.0.0017. S2CID 145140420.
- Falleti, Tulia (2010). Decentralization and Subnational Politics in Latin America. Cambridge: Cambridge University Press.
- Farrell, Mary, B. Hettne, and L. van Langenbove eds.(2005), Global Politics of Regionalism: Theory and Practice. London: Pluto.
- Goertz, Gary and K. Powers (2011). Regional Governance: The Evolution of a New Institutional Form, paper presented at the American Political Science Association, San Diego.
- Hooghe, L (1995). "Sub-national mobilization in the European Union". West European Politics. 18 (3): 175–98. doi:10.1080/01402389508425097. hdl:1814/1381.
- Hooghe, L. ed. (1996). Cohesion policy and European integration. Building multi-level governance, Oxford: Clarendon Press.
- Hooghe, L.; Marks, G. (1996). "'Europe with the Regions': channels of regional representation in the European Union". Publius: The Journal of Federalism. 26 (1): 73–91. doi:10.1093/oxfordjournals.pubjof.a029841.
- Hooghe, L., and G. Marks (2001). Multi-level governance and European integration. Lanham, MD: Rowman & Littlefield.
- Hooghe, L., and G. Marks (2002). Types of multi-level governance. Cahiers européens de Sciences Po 3 June.
- Hurrell, A (1995). "Explaining the Resurgence of Regionalism in World Politics". Review of International Studies. 21 (4): 331–358. doi:10.1017/s0260210500117954. S2CID 145277874.
- Hurrell, A. (2007). On Global Order: Power, Values, and the Constitution of International Society. Oxford: Oxford University Press.
- Leonardi, R. (2005). Cohesion Policy in the European Union: The Rebuilding of Europe. Houndsmills, Hampshire: Palgrave.
- Marks, G. (1992). Structural policy in the European Community, in: Sbragia, A. (ed.), Europolitics. Institutions and policymaking in the 'new' European Community. 191–225.
- Marks, G. (1993). Structural policy and multi-level governance in the EC, in: A. Cafruny and G. Rosenthal (eds.), The state of the European Community. Vol. 2, The Maastricht debates and beyond, 391–410. Boulder, CO: Lynne Rienner.
- Marks, G (1996). "An actor-centred approach to multi-level governance". Regional and Federal Studies. 6 (2): 20–40. doi:10.1080/13597569608420966.
- Marks, G.; Hooghe, L. (2003). "Unravelling the central state, but how? Types of multi-level governance". American Political Science Review. 97 (2): 233–43.
- Marks, G., and L. Hooghe (2004). Contrasting visions of multi-level governance, in: Bache and Flinders (eds.), Multi-level governance, 15–30 Oxford: Oxford Univ. Press.
- Marks, G.; Hooghe, L.; Blank, K. (1996). "European integration from the 1980s: state-centric v. multi-level governance". Journal of Common Market Studies. 34 (3): 341–78. doi:10.1111/j.1468-5965.1996.tb00577.x.
- Marks, G., and D. McAdam (1996). Social movements and the changing structure of political opportunity in the European Union, in: G. Marks, F.W. Scharpf, P. Schmitter and W. Streeck (eds.), Governance in the European Union, 95–120. London: Sage.
- Marks, G.; Nielsen, F.; Ray, L.; Salk, J.E. (1996). "Competencies, cracks and conflicts: regional mobilization in the European Union". Comparative Political Studies. 29 (2): 164–92. doi:10.1177/0010414096029002002. S2CID 154107196.
- Obinger, H., F. G. Castles, S. Leibfried (eds.) (2005). Federalism and the Welfare State. Cambridge: Cambridge University Press.
- Peters, G., J. Pierre (2004). A Faustian Bargain? in: I. Bache, M. Flinders (eds.) Multi-level Governance. Oxford: Oxford University Press.
- Rodden, J. (2006). Hamilton’s Paradox: The Promise and Peril of Fiscal Federalism. Cambridge: Cambridge University Press.
- Rokkan, Stein (with Derek Urwin) (1983). Economy, Territory, Identity: Politics of West European Peripheries. London: Sage Publications.
- Scharpf, F (2007). "The Joint Decision Trap Revisited". Journal of Common Market Studies. 44 (4): 845–64. doi:10.1111/j.1468-5965.2006.00665.x. hdl:11858/00-001M-0000-0012-4C01-7. S2CID 154583475.
- Smoke, P., E. J. Gómez, G. E. Peterson eds. (2006). Decentralization in Asia and Latin America: Towards a Comparative Interdisciplinary Perspective. Edward Elgar.
- Treisman, D (2000). "Causes of Corruption: A Cross-National Study". Journal of Public Economics. 76 (3): 399–457. CiteSeerX 10.1.1.335.8783. doi:10.1016/s0047-2727(99)00092-4.
- Volgy, T. J.; Fausett, E.; Grant, K.A.; Rodgers, S. (2008). "Identifying Formal Intergovermental Organizations". Journal of Peace Research. 45 (6): 849–62. doi:10.1177/0022343308096159. S2CID 27721042.
