= James Tilley =

James Tilley may refer to:

- James Tilley (rugby league) (born 1993), Jamaican rugby league footballer
- James Tilley (footballer) (born 1998), English footballer for AFC Wimbledon
- James Tilley (political scientist), professor of politics

== See also ==
- Jim Tilley (born 1950), Canadian-born American poet
