= EUSA =

EUSA or Eusa may refer to:

- Edinburgh University Students' Association
- Eighth United States Army or U.S. Eighth Army
- European Union Studies Association
- European University Sports Association
- Eusa, a character in Russell Hoban's Riddley Walker
- Eusa, an album by Yann Tiersen
- Eusa Kills, an album by The Dead C.
- Eusa, the Breton name for the French island, Ushant
