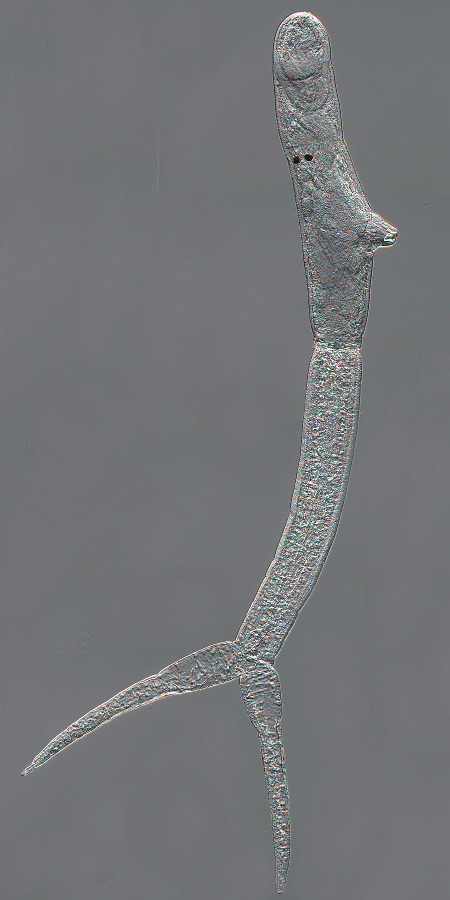
- Trichobilharzia regenti, cercaria

Scientific classification
- Kingdom: Animalia
- Phylum: Platyhelminthes
- Class: Trematoda
- Order: Diplostomida
- Family: Schistosomatidae
- Genus: Trichobilharzia
- Species: T. regenti

Binomial name
- Trichobilharzia regenti Horák, Kolářová & Dvořák, 1998

= Trichobilharzia regenti =

Species of fluke

Trichobilharzia regenti is a neuropathogenic parasitic flatworm of birds which also causes cercarial dermatitis in humans. The species was originally described in 1998 in the Czech Republic and afterwards it was detected also in other European countries, e.g. Denmark, Belgium, Germany, France, Iceland, Poland, Switzerland, or Russia, and even in Iran. For its unique neurotropic behaviour in vertebrate hosts, the host-parasite interactions are extensively studied in terms of molecular biology, biochemistry and immunology.

== Life cycle ==
The life cycle of T. regenti is analogous to that of human schistosomes. Adult flukes mate in a nasal mucosa of anatid birds (e.g. Anas platyrhynchos, Spatula clypeata or Cairina moschata) and produce eggs with miracidia which hatch directly in the host tissue and leak outside when the bird is drinking/feeding. Once in water, the miracidia swim using their cilia and actively search for a proper molluscan intermediate host (Radix lagotis, Radix labiata, Radix peregra). In the snail, the miracidia develop into a primary sporocyst in which secondary sporocysts are formed and give rise to cercariae later on.

Cercariae, infective larvae, exit the snail and penetrate the skin of an avian host. After penetration of the host's skin, they shed the immunogenic surface glycocalyx and transform to schistosomula (subadult stage, sg. schistosomulum). Schistosomula then look for peripheral nerves to use them to get to the spinal cord. Through it they continue their migration to the brain and, finally, the nasal tissue in a bill. Here, they mature, copulate and lay eggs while causing pathology (inflammatory infiltration, haemorrhages).

If mammals are infected by cercariae (instead of birds), the parasites die in the skin being entrapped by immune response. The clinical manifestation of such infection is known as a neglected allergic disease called cercarial dermatitis (or swimmer's itch). In mice, especially in immunodeficient ones, migration of the parasite to the spinal cord was observed.

A complete life cycle of T. regenti can be maintained under laboratory conditions using Radix lagotis and the Domestic duck (Anas platyrhynchos f. domestica) as intermediate and definitive hosts, respectively. Interestingly, domestic ducks can also serve as reservoir hosts in aquaculture sites, such as rice fields. To study biology of T. regenti in mammals, C57BL/6, BALB/c a SCID mouse strains are used as accidental hosts.

== Migration in vertebrate hosts ==
When cercariae of T. regenti find either avian or mammalian host, they penetrate its skin. For this purpose, they are equipped with cysteine peptidases present in their excretory/secretory products, which are capable of keratin and collagen degradation. Experiments with laboratory prepared recombinant form of the cysteine peptidase cathepsin B2 of T. regenti (TrCB2) confirmed its ability to cleave skin proteins (collagen, keratin and elastin).

After penetration the skin, cercariae transform to schistosomula and start a migration through the host's body. They avoid penetration into blood capillaries and rather prefer entering peripheral nerves in host's limbs. Schistosomula are found in peripheral nerves of ducks and mice as soon as 1.5 and 1 day post infection (DPI), respectively. In both types of hosts, schistosomula exhibit a high affinity to the central nervous system which they enter via spinal roots. Based on recent observation by 3D imaging techniques (ultramicroscopy and micro-CT), schistosomula appear to migrate preferably through the white matter of the spinal cord in both birds and mammals.

The next course of the infection differs in final and accidental hosts. In ducks, schistosomula are observed in synsacral segments of a spinal cord 3 DPI and 7–8 days later (10–11 DPI) they reach the brain. In their final localisation (the nasal tissue), they occur 13–14 DPI and laying eggs starts 15 DPI. In mice, the first schistosomula are found in a lumbar spinal cord as early as 2 DPI and medulla oblongata is invaded the day after, but only in some individuals. Most of schistosomula stay localised in the thoracic and cervical spinal cord and only exceptionally migrate to the brain. Neither the presence of worms has been detected in a nasal cavity nor has their maturation been noticed in the nervous tissue. Schistosomula development in mice is suppressed likely due to the host immune response and/or the presence/absence of some essential (nutritional, stimulatory) host factors.

== Pathology in vertebrate hosts ==
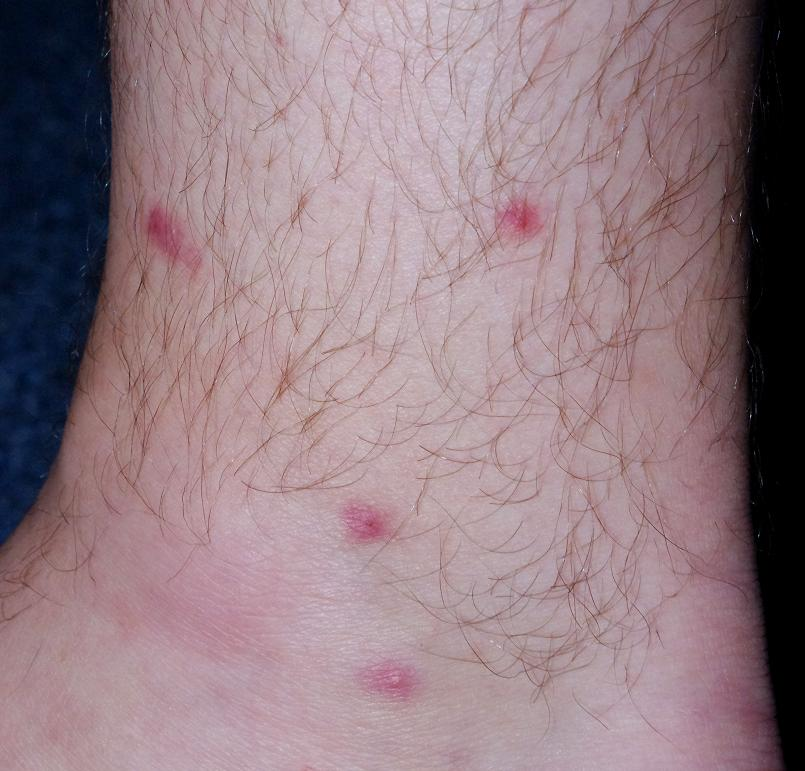
Cercarial dermatitis.

In vertebrate hosts infected by T. regenti, pathological states might be caused by:

- penetrating cercariae transforming to schistosomula in the skin,
- schistosomula migrating through the central nervous system (CNS),
- adults laying eggs in the nasal mucosa (only in avian hosts).

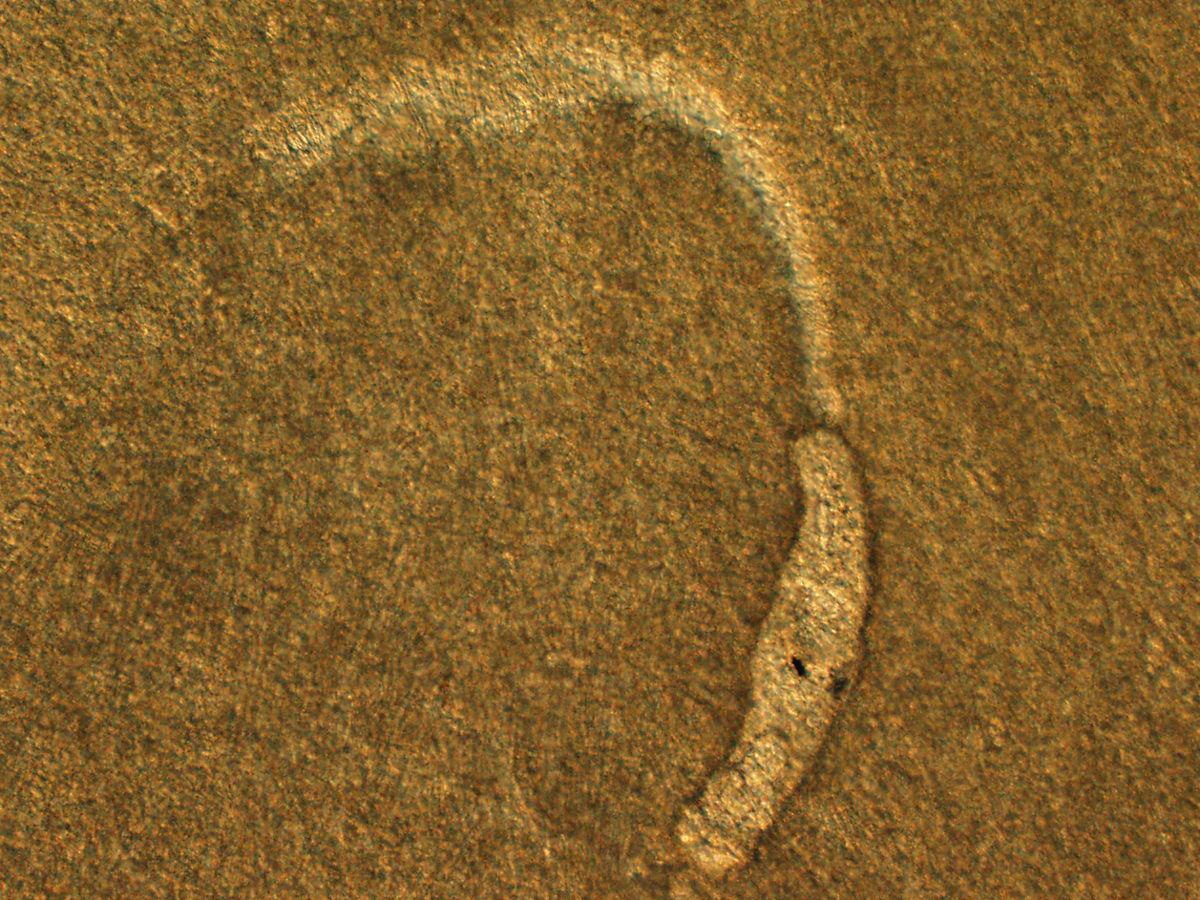
Schistosomulum of T. regenti.

Although mice are accidental hosts, most of the studies dealing with the pathological effects of T. regenti were conducted on this model.

=== Skin pathology ===
In the initial phase of the infection, early transformed schistosomula are localised in the skin. Information about pathology in the skin of birds has not been completed yet. In mice, immediate oedema and thickening of the site appear as early as 30 minutes after the penetration of cercariae; erythema is evident as well. Within 48 hours, inflammatory foci containing neutrophils, eosinophils, macrophages, CD4+ lymphocytes and degranulating mast cells develop around the parasites.

In case of repeated infections, the cellular infiltration is substantially elevated and the extensive inflammation may lead to formation of large abscesses or even epidermal and/or dermal necrosis. In humans, the clinical symptoms of cercarial penetration consist of macules/papules formation at the sites where the parasite entered the skin accompanied by intensive itching. The manifestation is more severe in previously sensitised people. This disease, caused not only by T. regenti but also by cercariae of other bird schistosome species, is called cercarial dermatitis (aka swimmer's itch). It is regarded as a neglected allergic disease.

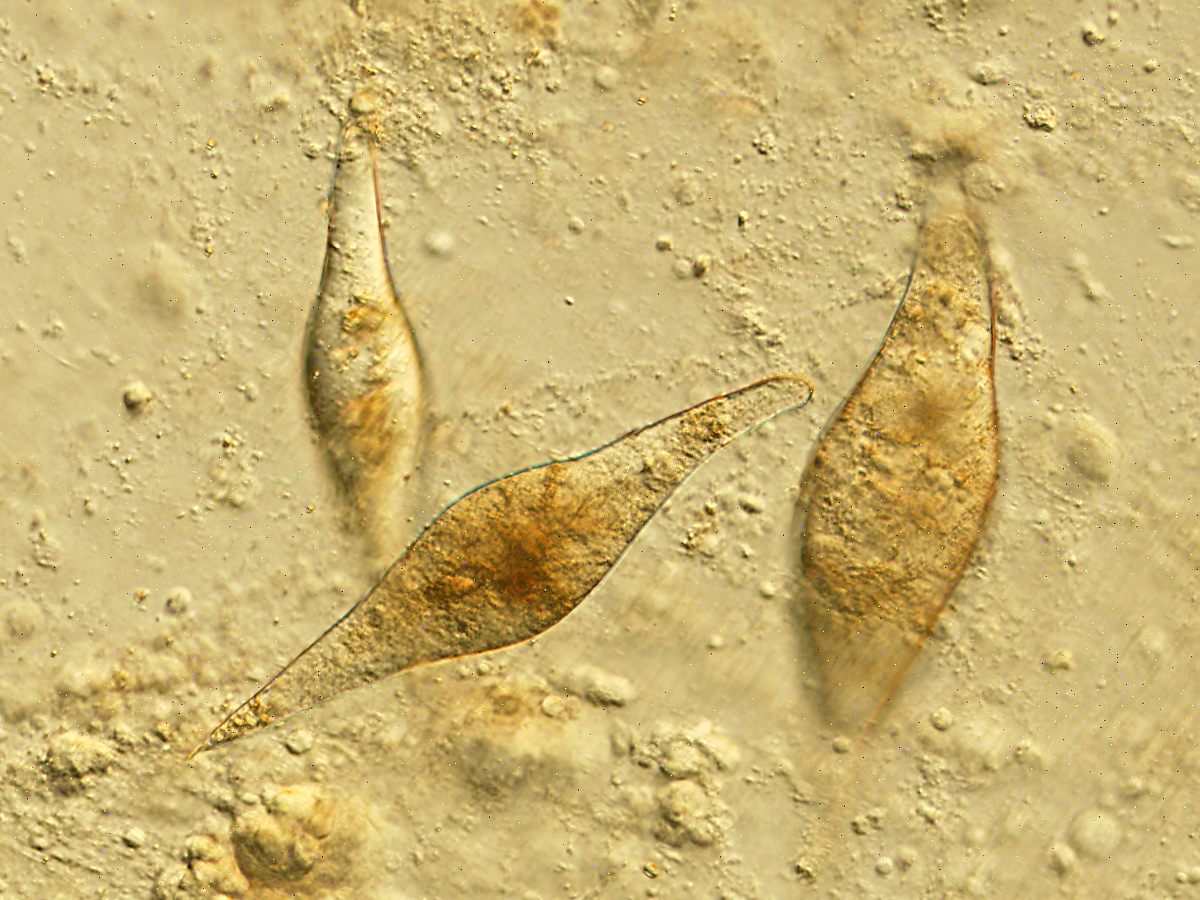
Eggs of T. regenti.

=== CNS pathology ===
The next phase of T. regenti infection is represented by schistosomula migration in the central nervous system. This is accompanied by serious neurological malfunctions in birds that suffer from leg paralysis and balance disorders. In ducks, eosinophilic meningitis with parasites surrounded by eosinophils and heterophils was noted. Additionally, leukocytes infiltrated perivascular spaces and tissues adjacent to the central canal.

At this stage, schistosomula feed on nervous tissue as demonstrated by detection of oligodendrocytes and neurons in the lumen of parasite's intestine. A cysteine peptidase cathepsin B1 of T. regenti (TrCB1) localised in intestines of migrating schistosomula is capable of myelin basic protein degradation, thus probably serving for nervous tissue digestion. Nonetheless, the nervous tissue ingestion has likely only a minor pathogenic effect on the host central nervous tissue. This is underpinned by observations of leg paralysis only in immunocompromised hosts, whereas in experiments with immunocompetent mouse strains, the infected animals did not reveal any neurological disorders. The neurological symptoms originate probably in mechanical damage of the nervous tissue leading to dystrophic or even necrotic changes of neurons and axonal injury. The cause of it is large migrating schistosomula (approximately 340×80 μm) which are not destroyed by proper immune response. Recently, massive downregulation of neurophysiological pathways was suggested to be responsible for the motor dysfunction detected also in properly examined immunocompetent mice.

=== Nasal pathology ===
In avian hosts, T. regenti reaches the nasal tissue where it mates and lay eggs. The gross pathology at this site consists of focal haemorrhages dispersed all over the mucosa. Infiltrates of lymphocytes are present around the eggs and even granulomas containing lymphocytes, eosinophils and heterophils form at later phases. Similar infiltrates are present around free miracidia, but the granuloma formation was not recorded. No cell reaction was noted in the vicinity of adult worms.

== Immune response in vertebrate hosts ==
=== Ducks ===
The records on cellular immune response to T. regenti in ducks are rather scarce. Cell infiltration of affected skin sites in repeatedly infected ducks was only noted, however, lacking further characterization of the infiltrating cells. In the CNS, eosinophils and heterophils surround the parasite but do not prevent its migration towards the final localisation in the nasal mucosa.

Considering antibody response, anti-cercarial IgM culminates 15 DPI, while anti-cercarial IgY reaches a peak 30 DPI. Ducks infected at higher age have higher anti-cercarial IgY levels than those infected at lower age. However, the anti-cercarial IgY levels are not largely dependent on the infection dose. Several parasite antigens recognized specifically by host IgY are considered as candidates for immunodiagnostics.

=== Mice ===
The infection manifests as early type I hypersensitivity reaction and a late phase cutaneous inflammation.

Cellular immune response is represented by production of pro-inflammatory (IL-1β, IL-6 and IL-12p40) and anti-inflammatory (IL-10) cytokines in a skin of mice infected for the first time. Lymphocytes from their skin draining lymph nodes exhibit mixed Th1/Th2 polarization after exposure to parasite antigens. On the contrary, anti-inflammatory IL-4 and IL-10 dominate in mice infected repeatedly which also secrete large amounts of histamine from mast cells. Lymphocytes from their skin draining lymph nodes produce IL-4 and IL-5 after stimulation with parasite antigens which shows Th2 polarization of host immune response.

In a spinal cord, strong cellular immune response consisting of granulocytes, plasma cells, macrophages, and T-cells develops in immunocompetent mice especially around the damaged schistosomula. CD3-deficient mice develop no or just mild inflammation which is accompanied by neurological symptoms due to mechanical damage caused to the nervous tissue. Activated microglia are localised in the migratory tracks of schistosomula and in the inflammatory lesions containing parasite residues. Although microglia were suggested to take part in schistosomula destruction, they have anti-inflammatory M2 phenotype and rather facilitate the tissue repair. Hypertrophied astrocytes are located in the migratory tracks and in the proximity of the schistosomula which implies their role in immune response and tissue reparation. Murine astrocytes and microglia were shown to produce pro-inflammatory cytokines (IL-6 and TNF-α) and nitric oxide after in vitro exposure to parasite antigens, which supports their role in host immune response.

IgM antibody response targets mainly carbohydrate epitopes of parasite molecules. Parasite-specific IgG1 and IgG2a are present as soon as 7 DPI. High levels of IgG1 and IgG2b, but no IgG2a, specific to mostly protein epitopes of cercarial homogenate are detectable as long as 150 DPI in repeatedly infected mice. The level of total IgE increases as soon as 10 DPI and remains high up to 150 DPI in reinfected mice. Increased production of antigen-specific IgG1 and total IgE, but slight decrease in antigen-specific IgG2b corroborate Th2 immune polarization in repeatedly infected individuals.

=== Humans ===
Clinical manifestation of human immune response to T. regenti infection is known as cercarial dermatitis (aka swimmer's itch). Majority of humans (82% of adults, 57% of children) who have experienced cercarial dermatitis (caused by undetermined species of bird schistosome) have increased levels of T. regenti antigen-specific IgG, but not IgE. Cercarial homogenate and excretory-secretory products of T. regenti induce basophils from humans without a history of cercarial dermatitis to degranulate and release IL-4.
