= Flexible specialization =

Flexible specialization may refer to:

- Flexible Specialization (Post-Fordism), a name given to the dominant system of economic production, consumption and associated socio-economic phenomena, in most industrialized countries since the late 20th century
- Network governance, also known as Flexible Specialization
