= European studies =

Academic field

European studies is a field of study offered by many academic colleges and universities that focuses on the History of Western civilization and the evolution of Western culture, as well as on current developments in European integration.

Some programmes offer a social science or public administration curriculum focusing on developments in the European Union. These programmes usually include a combination of political science, EU public policy, European history, European law, economics and sociology. Other universities approach the subject in a broader manner, including topics like European culture, European literature and European languages. Those programmes that focus on the study of the European Union, they often cover national topics (in a comparative perspective) as well.

The subject combines humanities and social sciences. Disciplines that are involved in European studies include:

- Anthropology
- Cultural studies
- Economics
- European languages
- Ethnology
- Geography
- History
- International relations
- Law
- Linguistics
- Literature
- Philosophy
- Psychology
- Political science
- Public administration
- Sociology

While European studies departments are more common in Europe than elsewhere, they exist elsewhere including in North America, Asia and Australasia.

== European studies associations ==
- UACES – the academic association for Contemporary European Studies
- European Union Studies Association
- Arbeitskreis Europäische Integration

== See also ==
- European Union studies
