= European Union studies =

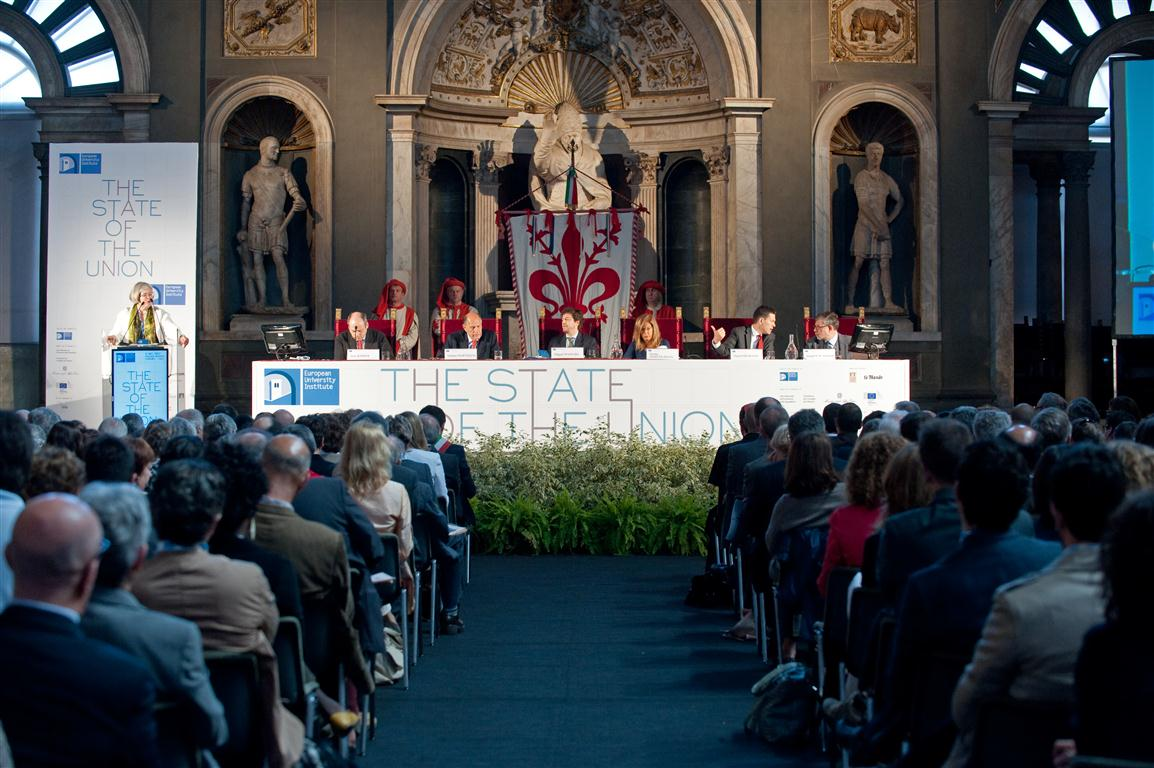
State of the Union conference at the EUI, 2013.

Continental territories of the Member States of the European Union

European Union studies or EU studies is an interdisciplinary academic field within social sciences which is concerned with the study of European Union. The discipline is often described as a subfield of European studies. Over the time two dominant geographical centres in EU studies developed in United States and European Union itself.

== History ==
The early development of the field was influenced by the beginning of European integration in 1950s in the aftermath of World War II. The French Commission for the Study of the European Communities was established in 1965 followed by West German Arbeitskreis für Europäische Integration in 1969.

Stronger academic interest in European Economic Community and European integration developed in 1980s. Various national organisations in the field established the European Community Studies Association in 1987. Over the time, some 500 institutions from 39 countries joined the association.

== See also ==
- History of the European Union
- European Union Studies Association
- Central European studies
- Balkan studies
- Scandinavian studies
- Yugoslav studies
