= Journal of East Asian Studies =

Peer-reviewed academic journal

- Discipline: Asian studies
- Language: English
- Edited by: Thomas Pepinsky

Publication details
- History: 2001–present
- Publisher: Cambridge University Press
- Frequency: Triannually
- Open access: Yes
- License: CC BY
- Impact factor: 1.6 (2024)

Standard abbreviations
- ISO 4: J. East Asian Stud.

Indexing
- ISSN: 1598-2408 (print); 2234-6643 (web)
- LCCN: 2001235376
- JSTOR: 15982408
- OCLC no.: 646822955

Links
- Journal homepage; Online access; Online archive

The Journal of East Asian Studies is a triannual peer-reviewed open-access academic journal covering East Asian studies. It was established in 2001 and is published by Cambridge University Press. As of 2024, the editor-in-chief is Thomas Pepinsky (Cornell University).

== Abstracting and indexing ==
The journal is abstracted and indexed in:

- EBSCO databases
- Modern Language Association Database
- ProQuest databases
- Scopus
- Social Sciences Citation Index

According to the Journal Citation Reports, the journal has a 2024 impact factor of 1.6.
