= Thomas Pepinsky =

American political scientist

- Born: 1979 (age 46–47)
- Citizenship: American

Academic background
- Education: Brown University; Yale University

Academic work
- Discipline: Political science
- Sub-discipline: Comparative politics, international political economy

Thomas B. Pepinsky (born 1979) is an American political scientist. He specializes in comparative politics and international political economy, with a regional focus on Maritime Southeast Asia. He is the Walter F. LaFeber Professor of Government and Director of the Southeast Asia Program at Cornell University. He is editor-in-chief of the Journal of East Asian Studies.

== Early life and education ==
Pepinsky was born in 1979. He received a Bachelor of Arts in linguistics and international relations from Brown University in 2001 and completed his PhD in political science at Yale University in 2007. His wife is a musician who teaches at Cornell.

== Career ==
From 2007 to 2008 Pepinsky was Assistant Professor of Political Science at the University of Colorado Boulder. He moved to Cornell University in 2008, where he has taught since. Since 2021 he has held the Walter F. LaFeber Professorship at Cornell.

Pepinsky serves as Executive Vice President of the Association for Analytical Learning on Islam and Muslim Societies and serves on the executive board of the Southeast Asian Research Group. He is fluent in Indonesian.

Since 2018 Pepinsky has been a Nonresident Senior Fellow at the Brookings Institution.

== Publications ==
=== Articles ===
- Modeling Spatial Heterogeneity and Historical Persistence: Nazi Concentration Camps and Contemporary Intolerance, American Political Science Review, March 2, 2023 (co-authored with Sara Wallace Goodman and Conrad Ziller)
