= Liesbet Hooghe =

Belgian political scientist

Liesbet Hooghe (born December 1, 1962, in Oudenaarde, Belgium) is a Belgian political scientist, currently serving as the W. R. Kenan Jr. Professor of Political Science at the University of North Carolina at Chapel Hill. She is also a research fellow at the European University Institute, Florence. In a list of 400 top political scientists at Ph.D. granting institutions in the US, published in Political Science & Politics (January 2019), she was ranked as the fifth most-cited woman scholar in political science.

== Education ==
She graduated summa cum laude from Katholieke Universiteit Leuven with a Licentiate in Political Sciences in 1984, and received her Ph.D. in Political Science from KU Leuven in 1989. She was a Fulbright Postdoctoral Fellow at Cornell University in 1989–1990, and a postdoctoral fellow at Nuffield College, Oxford (1991–1994).

== Academic appointments and honors ==
Hooghe was appointed Assistant Professor at the University of Toronto in 1994, obtaining tenure in 1999. In 2000, she moved to the University of North Carolina at Chapel Hill. She was promoted to full professor in 2004, and appointed W.R. Kenan Jr. Distinguished Professor in 2011. Between 2004 and 2016, she was also a chaired professor at VU Amsterdam.

She has held fellowships at the European University Institute, Florence, the Wissenschaftszentrum at Berlin, the Hanse Wissenschaftskolleg in Delmenhorst, the Freie Universität Berlin, and visiting professorships at Sciences Po, Pompeu Fabra, and the Vienna IHS. In 2012, she was inducted as a Foreign Member into the Royal Flemish Academy of Belgium for Science and the Arts.

== Publications and leadership ==
Hooghe has published several scholarly books, special journal issues, and many articles in the leading journals of political science.

She served as Chair of the European Union Studies Association (2007–2009), and was Chair of the European Politics & Society Section of the American Political Science Association (2003–2006). She received the Alexander von Humboldt Research Fellowship (2002–2003), Jean Monnet Fellowships (1996–1997; 2002–2003 declined), a Fellowship at the Hanse Institute for Advanced Study (2007–2008), and a Fellowship at the Research Center of the Free University of Berlin (2010–2011). In 2017, she was awarded the Daniel J. Elazar Distinguished Federalism Award from the American Political Science Association.

== Personal life ==
Hooghe is married to fellow political scientist Gary Marks.

== Recent research ==
Her academic reputation rests primarily on her conception of "multilevel governance"—how government is organized from the local to the global level. She has written extensively on the European Union and on sub-national government and her publications have been translated in French, German, Spanish, Italian, Romanian, Swedish, and Chinese.

Over the past fifteen years, Liesbet Hooghe, with her spouse Gary Marks, has sought to theorize the conditions of multilevel governance while striving to gain better information. Much of her research and publications can be categorized under five broad topics: regional authority and multilevel governance; international authority and multilevel governance; party politics and public opinion on European integration; political elites and the European Commission; measurement and data collection. In May 2010, Professors Hooghe and Marks received a five-year European Research Grant to conduct research on the causes and consequences of multilevel governance.

== Books ==
- 2019. A Theory of International Organization, with Tobias Lenz and Gary Marks. Oxford: OUP. In print.
- 2017. Measuring International Authority: A Postfunctionalist Theory of Governance, Vol. III, with Gary Marks, Tobias Lenz, Jeanine Bezuijen, Besir Ceka, Svet Derderyan. Oxford: OUP.
- 2016. Community, Scale, and Regional Governance: A Postfunctionalist Theory of Governance, Vol. II, with Gary Marks. Oxford: Oxford University Press. Voted “Book of the Summer” at MLGwatch.org.
- 2016. Measuring Regional Authority: A Postfunctionalist Theory of Governance, Vol.I, with Gary Marks, Arjan H. Schakel, Sara Niedzwiecki, Sandra Chapman Osterkatz, and Sarah Shair-Rosenfield. Oxford: Oxford University Press.
- 2013. The European Commission of the 21st Century, with Michael Bauer, Sara Connolly, Renaud Dehousse, Hussein Kassim, John Peterson, and Andrew Thompson. Oxford: OUP.
- 2010. The Rise of Regional Authority: A Comparative Study of 42 Democracies, with Gary Marks and Arjan H. Schakel.
- 2002. The European Commission and The Integration of Europe: Images of Governance
- 2001. Multi-Level Governance and European Integration, with Gary Marks. Lanham, M.D.: Rowman & Littlefield
- 1996. Cohesion Policy and European Integration. Building Multilevel Governance (edited)
- 1989. Separatisme: Conflict Tussen Twee Projecten voor Natievorming (PhD. dissertation)
