= Sara Hobolt =

Danish political scientist (born 1977)

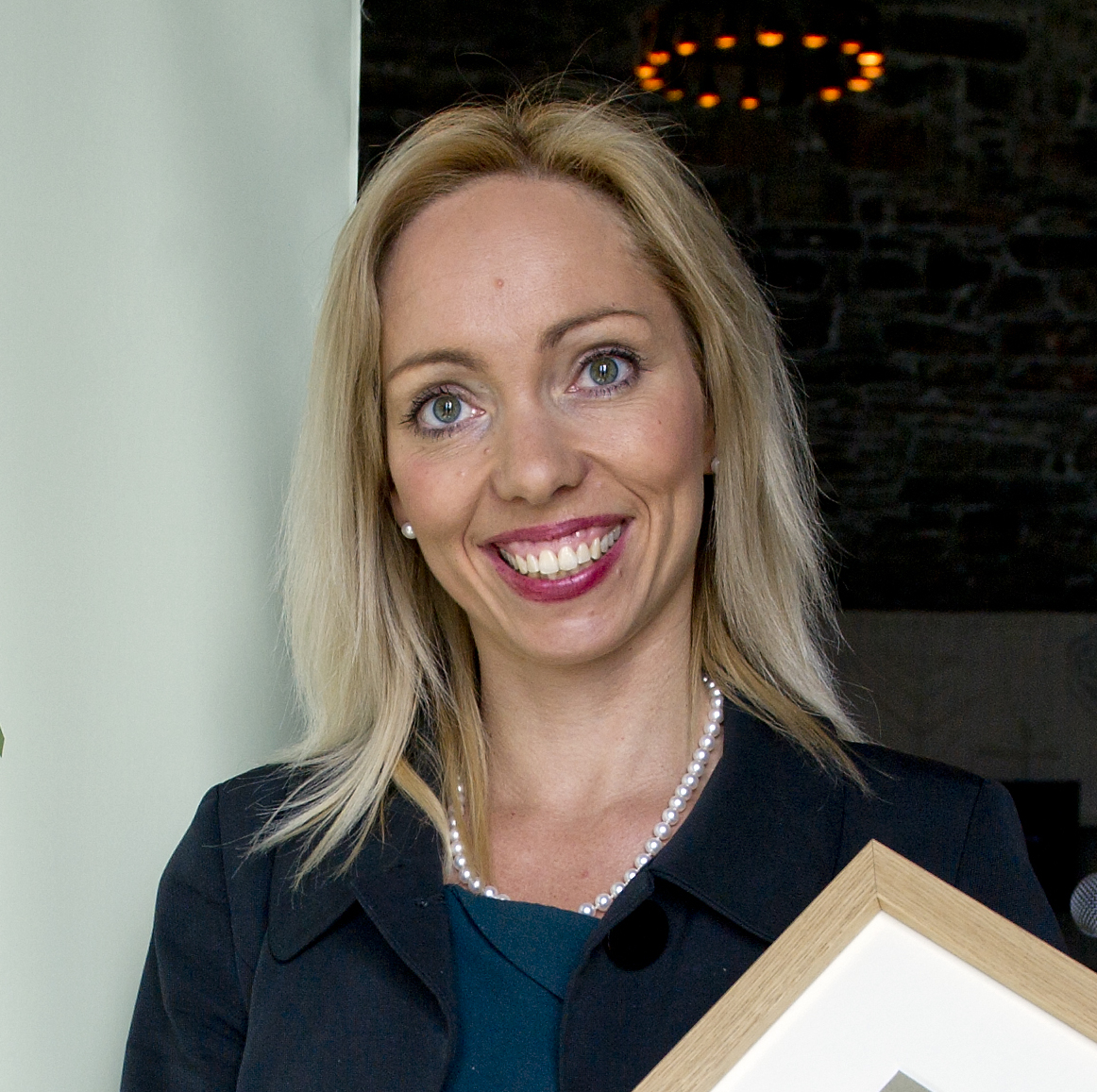
- Hobolt in 2012
- Born: 1977 (age 48–49)

Academic background
- Education: St John's College, Cambridge

Academic work
- Discipline: Political science
- Sub-discipline: European politics; electoral behaviour
- Institutions: London School of Economics and Political Science

Sara Binzer Hobolt, FBA (born 1977) is a Danish political scientist, who specialises in European politics and electoral behaviour. She holds the Sutherland Chair in European Institutions at the London School of Economics and Political Science.

== Early life and education ==
Hobolt was born in 1977. She graduated with a first class honours Bachelor of Arts (BA) degree in economics, politics and public policy in 2001. She undertook postgraduate studies in political science at the University of Cambridge, graduating with a Master of Philosophy (MPhil) degree in 2002 and completing her Doctor of Philosophy (PhD) degree in 2005. Her doctoral thesis was titled "Europe in question: the role of political information in referendums on European integration". While at Cambridge, she was a member of St John's College.

== Academic career ==
Hobolt began her academic career at the University of Oxford. She was a postdoctoral fellow at Nuffield College, Oxford from 2005 to 2006, and a fellow of Lincoln College, Oxford from 2006 to 2011. She was additionally a lecturer in comparative European politics in the Department of Politics and International Relations between 2006 and 2011. In 2009, she became an associated member of Nuffield College, Oxford, and an honorary professor in political science at the University of Southern Denmark. Since 2012, she has held the Sutherland Chair in European Institutions at the London School of Economics.

== Honours ==
In July 2017, Hobolt was elected a Fellow of the British Academy (FBA), the United Kingdom's national academy for the humanities and social sciences.

In 2011, Hobolt was awarded the EUSA "Award for Best Book Published in 2009 or 2010" for her book Europe in Question: Referendums on European Integration. In 2012, she was awarded the Nils Klim Prize; this prize is awarded "to Nordic scholars under the age of 35, for outstanding contributions within the arts and humanities, social sciences, law or theology".

== Selected works ==
- Sara B. Hobolt (2009). Europe in Question: Referendums on European Integration. Oxford: Oxford University Press. ISBN 978-0-19-954994-8.
- Sara B. Hobolt; James Tilley (2014). Blaming Europe?: Responsibility Without Accountability in the European Union. Oxford: Oxford University Press. ISBN 978-0-19-966568-6.
- Olaf Cramme; Sara B. Hobolt, eds. (2015). Democratic Politics in a European Union Under Stress. Oxford: Oxford University Press. ISBN 978-0-19-872448-3.
- de Vries, Catherine E.; Hobolt, Sara (2020). Political Entrepreneurs: The Rise of Challenger Parties in Europe. Princeton and Oxford: Princeton University Press. ISBN 978-0691194752.
