= Gary Marks =

American-based academic

- Born: 1952 (age 73–74); London, UK
- Education: Birmingham University; University of California, Santa Barbara; Stanford University
- Occupation: Academic
- Spouse: Liesbet Hooghe

Gary Marks (born 1952 in London) is an American-based academic and an expert on multilevel governance and the European Union. He is a Burton Craige Distinguished Professor of Political Science at the University of North Carolina at Chapel Hill. He is also a recurring Research Fellow at the Robert Schuman Centre, EUI, Florence. Marks developed the concept of "multilevel governance.”

== Early life ==
Gary Marks was born in 1952 in London, UK. He completed a B.Soc.Sc. at Birmingham University in England and received his M.A. in political science from University of California, Santa Barbara in 1974. In 1982 he received his PhD in political science from Stanford University. He was a student of Seymour Martin Lipset and Gabriel Almond.

== Academic career ==
Marks took up a tenure-track position at the University of Virginia in 1982. In 1986 Marks moved to UNC-Chapel Hill where he became Associate Professor in 1989, Full Professor in 1994 and Burton Craige Distinguished Professor in 2004. From 2004 to 2016 Marks was also chair in Multilevel Governance at the VU University Amsterdam.

Gary Marks has been a visiting fellow/professor at the Center for Advanced Study in the Behavioral Sciences, Stanford; Pompeu Fabra in Barcelona; the University of Twente, Enschede; Sciences Po, Paris; the Higher Institute of Sciences in Vienna; the WZB in Berlin; the Hanse wissenschaftskolleg in Delmenhorst; the Free University of Berlin; and the EUI, Florence. He was recipient of an Advanced European Research Council Grant (2010–2015) for a research program titled "Causes and Consequences of Multilevel Governance". In 2011, he was awarded the Humboldt Research Prize for his contributions to political science. In 2017, he was awarded the Daniel J. Elazar Distinguished Federalism Award from the American Political Science Association.

=== Publications and leadership ===
Marks has published multiple books, several special issues and he has authored or co-authored many articles. From 1997 to 1999, Marks was the Chair of the European Union Studies Association. At the University of North Carolina in Chapel Hill he was the founding Director of the Center for European Studies and the European Union Center for Excellence at UNC-CH, which he led from 1994 to 2006.

=== Multilevel governance ===
Multilevel governance (MLG) can be described as the dispersion of authority away from central states to subnational and supranational levels. Marks developed this concept to characterize the European Union decision-making dynamics in a 1993 publication. Since then, the concept has been featured in the titles of many articles and several dozen books. Marks’ research over the past decade has sought to theorize the causes and consequences of MLG and systematize information about governance at the subnational and international levels; to analyze preferences and conflicts over multilevel governance, especially in Europe; to understand the causality of multilevel governance in a broad comparative frame, drawing on literature in political science, history, economics, and sociology; and to generate data that is suitable for testing expectations in these fields.

In a 1996 Journal of Common Market Studies article, Marks and co-authors develop the concept of multilevel governance and contrast it with intergovernmentalism.

“Instead of the two-level game assumptions adopted by state centrists, MLG theorists posit a set of overarching, multi-level policy networks… The presumption of multi-level governance is that these actors participate in diverse policy networks, and this may involve sub-national actors — interest groups and subnational governments — dealing directly with supranational actors.”

In their 2003 American Political Science Review article Marks and Hooghe conceptualize two ideal-types of MLG, general purpose (or Type I) and task-specific (or Type II) governance, with the goal of theorizing the "unraveling of the state" in Europe and beyond.

Type I governance, predominant within states, roots jurisdictions around human communities at differing scales. These jurisdictions—international, national, regional, meso, local—are general-purpose. They bundle multiple functions, including a range of policy responsibilities, and in many instances, a court system and representative institutions. The boundaries of such jurisdictions do not intersect. The result is an elegant system of jurisdictions nested across levels and non-overlapping at any particular level.

Type II governance, predominant above states, conceives of jurisdictions built around policy problems. Governance is fragmented into functionally specific pieces—specialised jurisdictions. Each makes a delimited set of authoritative decisions on a particular problem, task, or issue. Jurisdictions are problem-encompassing; each jurisdiction specialises in one or a few governance functions; the number of such jurisdictions is potentially huge, and the scales at which they operate vary finely. The jurisdictions overlap, intersect, and rarely co-ordinate.

== Personal life ==
Marks is married to fellow political scientist Liesbet Hooghe.

== Works ==
- Marks, Gary (1989). Unions in Politics: Britain, Germany, and the United States in the Nineteenth and Early Twentieth Centuries. Princeton, New Jersey: Princeton University Press. ISBN 9780691078014. OCLC 18381346.
- Lemke, Christiane; Marks, Gary, eds. (1992). The Crisis of Socialism in Europe. Durham, North Carolina: Duke University Press. ISBN 9780822311973. OCLC 23462173.
- Diamond, Larry; Marks, Gary, eds. (1992). Reexamining Democracy: Essays in Honor of Seymour Martin Lipset. Sherman Oaks, California: SAGE Publications. ISBN 9780803946415. OCLC 25874129.
- Marks, Gary; Scharpf, Fritz W.; Schmitter, Philippe C.; Streeck, Wolfgang, eds. (1996). Governance in the European Union. Thousand Oaks, California: SAGE Publications. ISBN 9781849207041. OCLC 464670698.
- Kitschelt, Herbert; Lange, Peter; Marks, Gary; Stephens, John D., eds. (1999). Continuity and Change in Contemporary Capitalism. Cambridge, UK: Cambridge University Press. ISBN 9780521624466. OCLC 39007182.
- Lipset, Seymour Martin; Marks, Gary (2000). It Didn't Happen Here: Why Socialism Failed in the United States. New York: W.W. Norton & Co. ISBN 9780393040982. OCLC 43403442.
- Hooghe, Liesbet; Marks, Gary (2001). Multi-level Governance and European Integration. Lanham, Maryland: Rowman & Littlefield Publishers. ISBN 9780742510197. OCLC 44750667.
- Marks, Gary; Steenbergen, Marco R., eds. (2004). European Integration and Political Conflict. Cambridge, UK: Cambridge University Press. ISBN 9780511186547. OCLC 560090522.
- Hooghe, Liesbet; Marks, Gary; Schakel, Arjan H. (2010). The Rise of Regional Authority: A Comparative Study of 42 Democracies. 9780415578363. OCLC 461895849.
- Hooghe, Liesbet, Gary Marks, Arjan Schakel, Sara Niedzwiecki, Sandra Chapman Osterkatz, Sarah Shair-Rosenfield (2016). Measuring Regional Authority: A Postfunctionalist Theory of Governance, Vol.I. Oxford: Oxford University Press.
- Hooghe, Liesbet and Gary Marks (2016). Community, Scale and Regional Governance: A Postfunctionalist Theory of Governance, Vol. II. Oxford: Oxford University Press.
- Hooghe, Liesbet, Gary Marks, Tobias Lenz, Jeanine Bezuijen, Besir Ceka, Svet Derderyan (2017). Measuring International Authority: A Postfunctionalist Theory of Governance, Vol. III. Oxford: Oxford University Press.
- Hooghe, Liesbet, Tobias Lenz, Gary Marks (2019). A Theory of International Organization: Postfunctionalist Theory of Governance, Vol. IV. Oxford: OUP. In print.
