= James Tilley (political scientist) =

James Tilley is a Professor of Politics at the University of Oxford and a Fellow of Jesus College, Oxford. He is a specialist in the study of public opinion and electoral behaviour.

== Bibliography ==
- Sara Hobolt and James Tilley (2026), Tribal Politics: How Brexit divided Britain (Oxford: Oxford University Press). ISBN 978-0-19-891171-5
- Geoff Evans and James Tilley (2017), The New Politics of Class: The political exclusion of the British working class (Oxford: Oxford University Press). ISBN 978-0-19-875575-3
- Sara Hobolt and James Tilley (2014), Blaming Europe? Responsibility without accountability in the European Union (Oxford: Oxford University Press). ISBN 978-0-19-966568-6

== Broadcasts ==
- BBC Radio 4 (Currently): Ten years after Brexit: Tribal
- BBC Radio 4 (Currently, five part series): The kids are alt-right?
- BBC Radio 4 (Analysis): What's the point of protest?
- BBC Radio 4 (Analysis): Personality politics
- BBC Radio 4 (Analysis): Do voters need therapy?
- BBC Radio 4 (Analysis): Conspiracy politics
- BBC Radio 4: Let's raise the voting age!
- BBC World Service (The Inquiry): How do dictators survive so long?
- BBC Radio 4 (Analysis): The dictator's survival guide
- BBC World Service (The Why Factor): What can chimps teach us about politics?
- BBC Radio 4 (Analysis): Primate politics
