= Swimmer's itch =

Itchy skin lesions due to infection by water-borne parasitic flatworms

- Other names: Schistosome dermatitis
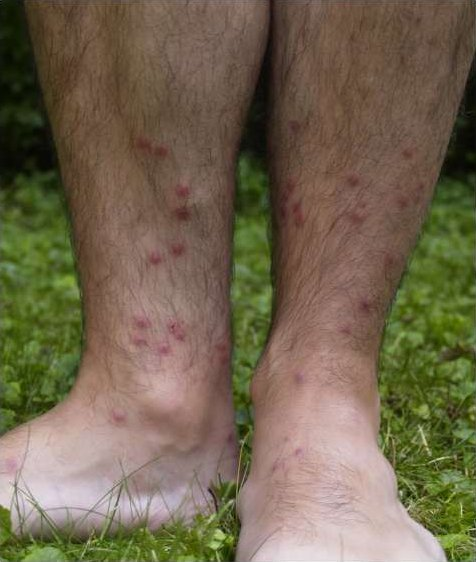
- Cercarial dermatitis on lower legs, four days after spending a day in the shallows of a lake
- Specialty: Infectious diseases

Swimmer's itch, cercarial dermatitis or schistosome dermatitis is a short-term allergic contact dermatitis occurring in the skin of humans that have been infected by water-borne schistosomes, a type of flatworm. It is common in freshwater, brackish and marine habitats worldwide. The incidence of the condition may be increasing, although that might be attributed to better monitoring and reporting. Nevertheless, the condition is considered to be an emerging infectious disease.

The main symptom is itchy papules (raised skin) that commonly occur within two days of infection. Initially, wheals develop quickly, then turn into maculae in about half an hour. Within 10–12 hours they turn into very itchy papules that reach their worst by the second or third day. The papules disappear in one or two weeks but secondary effects from scratching can continue longer. The intense itching, which peaks after 48–72 hours, is associated with pain and swelling of the affected areas. People repeatedly exposed to cercariae develop heavier symptoms with faster onset.

There are no permanent effects to people from this condition. Orally administered hydroxyzine, an antihistamine, is sometimes prescribed to treat swimmer's itch and similar dermal allergic reactions. In addition, bathing in oatmeal, baking soda, or Epsom salts can also provide relief of symptoms.

== Cause ==
Swimmer's itch was known to exist as early as the 19th century, but it was not until 1928 that a biologist found that the dermatitis was caused by the larval stage of a group of flatworm parasites in the family Schistosomatidae. The genera most commonly associated with swimmer's itch in humans are Trichobilharzia and Gigantobilharzia. It can also be caused by schistosome parasites of non-avian vertebrates, such as Schistosomatium douthitti, which infects snails and rodents. Other taxa reported to cause the reaction include Bilharziella polonica and Schistosoma bovis. In marine environments, especially along the coasts, swimmer's itch can occur as well.

These parasites use both freshwater snails and vertebrates as hosts in their parasitic life cycles as follows:

1. Once a schistosome egg is immersed in water, a short-lived, non-feeding, free-living stage known as the miracidium emerges. The miracidium uses cilia to follow chemical and physical cues thought to increase its chances of finding the first intermediate host in its life cycle: a freshwater snail.
2. After infecting a snail, it develops into a mother sporocyst, which in turn undergoes asexual reproduction, yielding large numbers of daughter sporocysts, which asexually produce another short-lived, free-living stage, the cercaria.
3. Cercariae use a tail-like appendage (often forked in genera causing swimmer's itch) to swim to the surface of the water; and use various physical and chemical cues in order to locate the next and final (definitive) host in the life cycle: a bird. These larvae can accidentally come into contact with the skin of a swimmer. The cercaria penetrates the skin and dies in the skin immediately. The cercariae cannot infect humans, but they cause an inflammatory immune reaction. This reaction causes initially mildly itchy spots on the skin. Within hours, these spots become raised papules which are intensely itchy. Each papule corresponds to the penetration site of a single parasite.
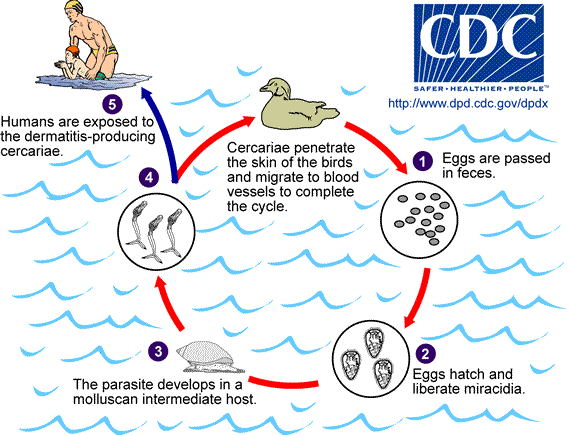
  Life-cycle of swimmers itch
4. After locating a bird, the parasite penetrates through the skin (usually the feet), dropping the forked tail in the process. Inside the circulatory system, the immature worms (schistosomula) develop into mature male and female worms, mate and migrate through the host's circulatory system (or nervous system in case of T. regenti) to the final location (veins feeding the gastrointestinal tract) within the host body. There they lay eggs in the small veins in the intestinal mucosa from which the eggs make their way into the lumen of the gut, and are dumped into the water when the bird defecates. One European species, Trichobilharzia regenti, instead infects the bird host's nasal tissues and larvae hatch from the eggs directly in the tissue during drinking/feeding of the infected birds.

== Risk factors ==
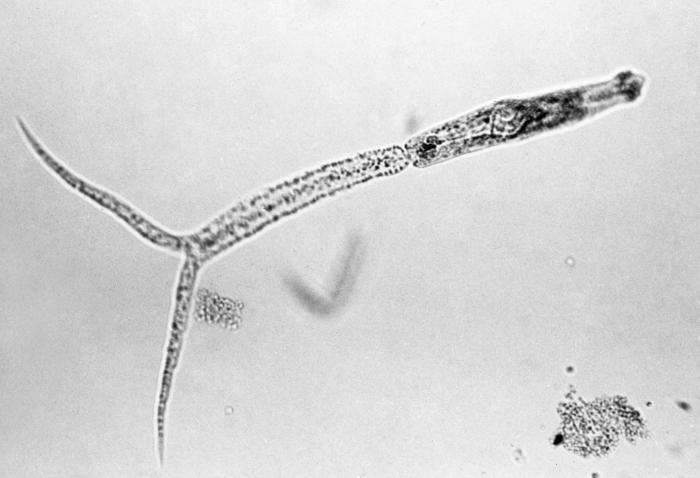
Image of infectious cercariae

Humans usually become infected after swimming in slow-moving rivers, lakes or ponds. Some laboratory evidence indicates snails shed cercariae most intensely in the morning and on sunny days, and exposure to water in these conditions may therefore increase risk. Duration of swimming is correlated with increased risk of infection in Europe and North America, and shallow inshore waters may harbour higher densities of cercariae than open waters offshore. Onshore winds are thought to cause cercariae to accumulate along shorelines. Studies of infested lakes and outbreaks in Europe and North America have found cases where infection risk appears to be evenly distributed around the margins of water bodies as well as instances where risk increases in endemic swimmer's itch "hotspots". Children may become infected more frequently and more intensely than adults but this probably reflects their tendency to swim for longer periods inshore, where cercariae also concentrate.

== Control ==
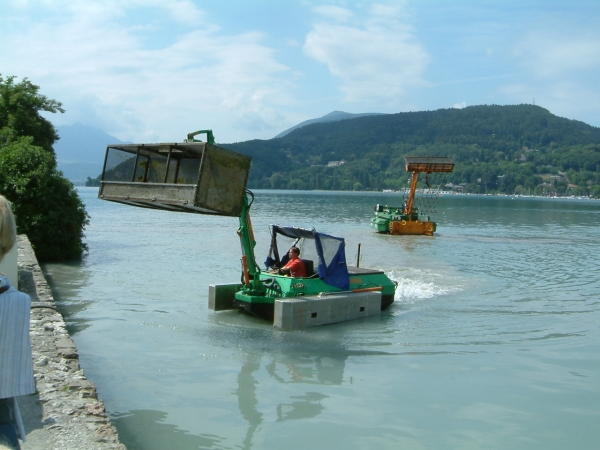
Mechanical removal of snails in Lake Annecy, France

Various strategies targeting the mollusc and avian hosts of schistosomes have been used by lakeside residents in recreational areas of North America to deal with outbreaks of swimmer's itch. In Michigan, for decades, authorities used copper sulfate as a molluscicide to reduce snail host populations and thereby the incidence of swimmer's itch. The results with this agent have been inconclusive, possibly because:

- Snails become tolerant
- Local water chemistry reduces the molluscicide's efficacy
- Local currents diffuse it
- Adjacent snail populations repopulate a treated area

More importantly, perhaps, copper sulfate is toxic to more than just molluscs, and the effects of its use on aquatic ecosystems are not well understood.

Another method targeting the snail host, mechanical disturbance of snail habitat, has been also tried in some areas of North America and Lake Annecy in France, with promising results. Some work in Michigan suggests that administering praziquantel to hatchling waterfowl can reduce local swimmer's itch rates in humans. Work on schistosomiasis showed that water-resistant topical applications of the common insect repellent DEET prevented schistosomes from penetrating the skin of mice. Public education of risk factors, a good alternative to the aforementioned interventionist strategies, can also reduce human exposure to cercariae.

== See also ==
- Sea louse
