= Jim Tilley =

American poet

- Born: 1950 (age 75–76); Montreal, Quebec, Canada
- Occupation: poet
- Website: jimtilley.net

Jim Tilley (born 1950), Canadian-born and a physicist by education, is an American poet who previously worked at senior management levels in the insurance and investment banking businesses.

== Business career ==
Jim Tilley was born in Montreal, Quebec, Canada in 1950. He graduated from St. Johns High School in St. Jean, Quebec in 1967 and from McGill University in 1971 with a First-Class Honors degree in Physics, winning the Anne Molson Gold Medal for Mathematics and Natural Philosophy. He earned a Ph.D. in Physics from Harvard University in 1975 and then joined Sun Life Financial at its U.S. headquarters in Wellesley, Massachusetts, qualifying as a Fellow of the Society of Actuaries in 1977. Tilley worked at John Hancock Financial in Boston from 1978 to 1981 when he moved to New York in the Group Pensions Department of Equitable Life Assurance.

In 1983, Tilley joined the Wall Street firm, Morgan Stanley, where he remained until his retirement in 2001. While at Morgan Stanley, he headed Worldwide Fixed Income Research and ended his career as Institutional Securities’ Chief Information Officer.

During his careers in the insurance industry and on Wall Street, Tilley wrote many pioneering research papers and was twice awarded the Society of Actuaries’ Annual Prize and also the Triennial Prize. His papers have also won awards from the Institute for Quantitative Research in Finance and the Casualty Actuarial Society. In 2008, he was named to receive the International Insurance Institute’s Founders’ Award for his seminal work in the field of asset liability management.

Tilley has served on the board of the Society of Actuaries, as chair of The Actuarial Foundation, on the board of the Presbyterian Church (U.S.A.) and as chair of its investment committee. He was the chair of the International Actuarial Association’s finance and investments section (AFIR). Tilley was a keynote speaker on the application of modern techniques in investments and finance to the management of insurance and pension funds at the 1988 International Congress of Actuaries in Helsinki.

== Career as a poet ==
After his retirement from Morgan Stanley in 2001, Tilley started writing poetry. Over 40 of his poems have been published in literary journals and magazines such as Southwest Review, Southern Review, Alaska Quarterly Review, Sycamore Review, Tar River Poetry, Southern Poetry Review, Atlanta Review, Florida Review and New Delta Review.

Tilley won the Sycamore Review’s Wabash Prize for Poetry, the New England Poetry Club’s Firman Houghton Award, and the Editors’ Choice Award from Rhino. Four of Tilley's poems have been nominated for a Pushcart Prize.

== Poetry ==
Jim Tilley's work appears in the college textbook anthology "Literature to Go" (Bedford/St. Martin’s), edited by Michael Meyer. His first book of poetry, "In Confidence," was published in January 2011 by Red Hen Press. His poems range from lyric to narrative, and while he generally writes in free verse, about half the poems in the book are in the form of sonnets.

=== Peer Reviews ===
Of Jim Tilley’s book, "In Confidence," Billy Collins, U.S. Poet Laureate from 2001–2003, writes:

"Jim Tilley does confide in his readers here as he explores a refreshing variety of subjects—everything from the complexity of father-son and husband-wife relations to the more solvable problems of dark matter and the origins of the cosmos. But what wins our confidence is not his range but his steady hand on the poem and his steady gaze at the world."
