= Sara Wallace Goodman =

American political scientist

- Born: 1979 (age 46–47); Beachwood, Ohio, USA
- Spouse: Adam Goodman (m. 2007)

Academic background
- Education: BA, Political Science, 2003, Miami University; MA, 2005, PhD, Government, 2009, Georgetown University
- Thesis: Civic integration requirements and the transformation of citizenship (2009)

Academic work
- Institutions: University of California, Irvine

Sara Wallace Goodman (born 1979) is an American political scientist. She is an associate professor of Political Science at the University of California, Irvine.

== Early life and education ==
Wallace Goodman was born in 1979 to Roni and Benjamin Wallace in Beachwood, Ohio. She earned her Bachelor of Arts degree at Miami University and her Master's degree and PhD at Georgetown University. While completing her PhD, Wallace Goodman married computer security specialist Adam Goodman in 2007.

== Career ==
Upon receiving her PhD, Wallace Goodman spent six months in the Netherlands completing a post-doctoral fellowship at Maastricht University. She returned to North America and accepted an assistant professor position at University of California, Irvine's (UCI) political science department. During the 2013–14 academic year, Wallace Goodman earned UCI's Social Sciences Assistant Professor Research Award and UCI's Hellman Fellowship. She also received an Israel Institute Grant to study citizenship and immigrant integration. Following these grants, she published her first book titled Immigration and membership politics in Western Europe which won the 2015 Best Book Award from the European Politics & Society section of the American Political Science Association.

As of 2020, Wallace Goodman also sits on the Editorial Board of the International Studies Quarterly. During the COVID-19 pandemic in North America, she collaborated with Shana Kushner Gadarian and Thomas Pepinsky to survey "3,000 Americans on a wide range of health behaviors, attitudes, and opinions about how to respond to the crisis." They continued to survey Americans during the pandemic to see if their beliefs and attitudes had changed. By July, Wallace Goodman and her research team found that there were "growing partisan gap in terms of fear of the disease, perceived safety of different behaviors, and preferred policy solutions."

== Publications ==
=== Books ===
- Immigration and membership politics in Western Europe, Cambridge University Press, October 2014

=== Articles ===
- Integration requirements for integration's sake? Identifying, categorising and comparing civic integration policies, Journal of Ethnic and Migration Studies, May 27, 2010
