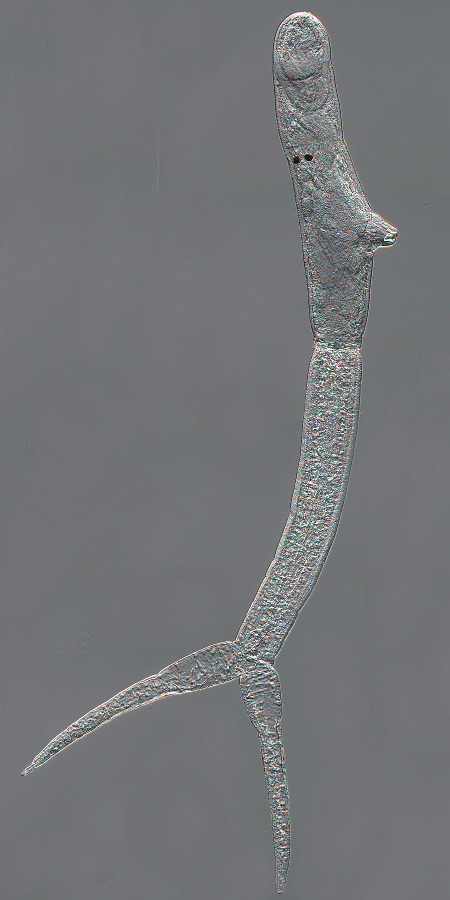
- Trichobilharzia regenti

Scientific classification
- Kingdom: Animalia
- Phylum: Platyhelminthes
- Class: Trematoda
- Order: Diplostomida
- Family: Schistosomatidae
- Subfamily: Schistosomatinae
- Genus: Trichobilharzia; Skrjabin & Zakharow, 1920

= Trichobilharzia =

Genus of flukes

Trichobilharzia is a genus of trematodes in the family Schistosomatidae. They are worldwide distributed parasites of anatid birds and causative agents of human cercarial dermatitis.

== General life cycle ==
The genus Trichobilharzia has a similar life cycle to that compared to the genus Schistosoma. The life cycle involves a one intermediate host, a water snail, and one final host, a bird. One singular egg is produced at a given time in the fertilized female. The deposition of this egg can vary depending on species.

=== Visceral Trichobilharzia vs. Nasal Trichobilharzia Egg depositation ===
Visceral Trichobilharzia species the egg is deposited in the capillaries of the bird while for nasal Trichobilharzia, the eggs are deposited in the nasal mucosa.

Once the miracidium exits the egg, whether that be in the surrounding water or the nasal passages, it seeks out the intermediate host, the snail. Once it enters the snail, and develops into a mother sporocyst it begins to reproduce daughter sporocysts asexually. With further migration from the foot of the snail to the hepatopancreas, it results in cercariae. The cercariae then exit the snail to seek out its final host, the bird. Once it finds the final host, the cercariae pierces the skin, and later develops into schistosomula.

=== General Visceral Trichobilharzia vs. Nasal Trichobilharzia Migration. ===
The schistosomula then migrates to particular species desired location where it will later reach sexual maturation and lay eggs starting they cycle over again.

For Visceral Trichobilharzia species, migration will occur through the blood circulation to the intestinal veins. The eggs then leave the final host through defecation.

For Nasal Trichobilharzia species, migration will occur through the nervous tissue to the soft nasal tissue. The eggs are then deposited with nasal secretions.

== Species ==
- Trichobilharzia ocellata (La Valette, 1855)
- Trichobilharzia regenti Horák, Kolářová & Dvořák, 1998
- Trichobilharzia franki Müller & Kimmig, 1994
