= Immunoglobulin Y =

Type of immunoglobulin

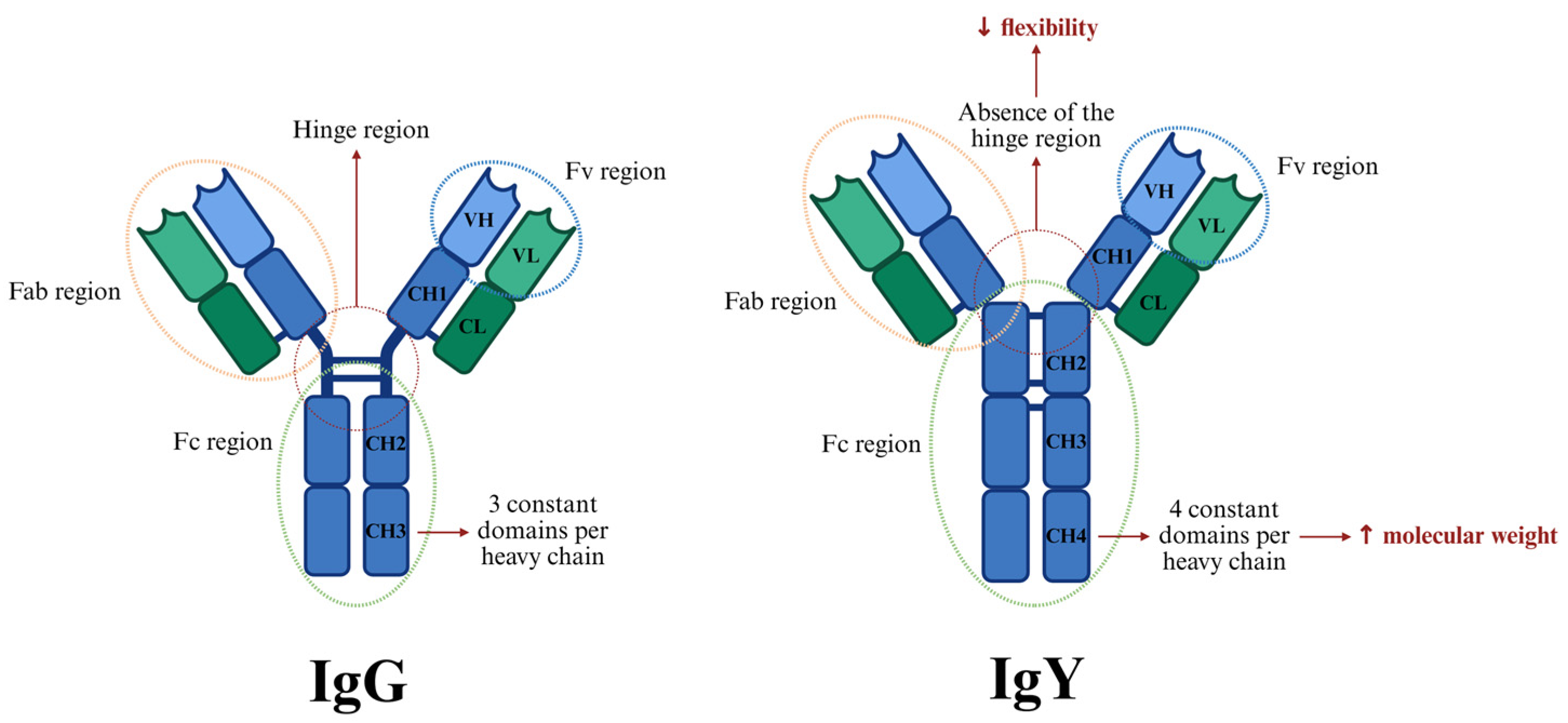
Structural comparison between immunoglobulin G (IgG) and immunoglobulin Y (IgY)

Immunoglobulin Y (abbreviated as IgY) is a type of immunoglobulin which is the major antibody in amphibian, bird, reptile, and lungfish blood. It is also found in high concentrations in chicken egg yolk. As with the other immunoglobulins, IgY is a class of proteins which are formed by the immune system in reaction to certain foreign substances, and specifically recognize them.

IgY is often mislabelled as immunoglobulin G (IgG) in older literature, and sometimes even in commercial product catalogues, due to its functional similarity to mammalian IgG and immunoglobulin E (IgE). However, this older nomenclature is obsolete, since IgY differs both structurally and functionally from mammalian IgG, and does not cross-react with antibodies raised against mammalian IgG.

Since chickens can lay eggs almost every day, and the yolk of an immunized hen's egg contains a high concentration of IgY, chickens are gradually becoming popular as a source of customised antibodies for research. (Usually, mammals such as rabbits or goats are injected with the antigen of interest by the researcher or a contract laboratory.)

== Characteristics ==
In chickens, immunoglobulin Y is the functional equivalent to immunoglobulin G (IgG). Like IgG, it is composed of two light and two heavy chains. Structurally, these two types of immunoglobulin differ primarily in the heavy chains, which in IgY have a molecular mass of about 65,100 daltons (Da), and are thus larger than in IgG. The light chains in IgY, with a molar mass of about 18,700 amu, are somewhat smaller than the light chains in IgG. The molar mass of IgY thus amounts to about 167,000 amu. The steric flexibility of the IgY molecule is less than that of IgG.

Functionally, IgY is partially comparable to immunoglobulin E (IgE), as well as to IgG. IgY is a fully functional antibody isotype for the species that make them. It binds to their own Fc receptors for IgY called FcRY and activates their complement systems.

=== Distribution ===
IgY is found in all groups of tetrapods except the marsupial and placental mammals, indicating that its absence in mammals is a derived trait. Phylogenetic trees show that IgY is likely the evolutionary precursor of both IgG and IgE. Monotremes such as the duck-billed platypus have IgY/O (hinged), IgE, and IgG.

Amphibians have another group of Igs called IgF. Its heavy chain arose by duplication of the IgY heavy chain, followed by loss of a few domains to form a "hinge".

=== Species-specific features ===
Ducks produce a truncated form of IgY which is missing part of the Fc region. As a result, it cannot bind complement or be picked up by macrophages.

IgY has also been analyzed in the Chinese soft-shelled turtle, Pelodiscus sinensis.

=== Laboratory aspects ===
In contrast to IgG, IgY does not bind to protein A, to protein G, or to mammalian Fc receptors. Furthermore, IgY does not activate the mammalian complement system. These are useful lab methods to demonstrate their difference from mammalian IgG and are not to be burdened with any biological meaning.

The name immunoglobulin Y was suggested in 1969 by G.A. Leslie and L.W. Clem, after they were able to show differences between the immunoglobulins found in chicken eggs, and immunoglobulin G. Other synonymous names are Chicken IgG, Egg Yolk IgG, and 7S-IgG.

== Bioanalytic applications ==
As compared to mammalian antibodies, IgY offers various advantages for the targeted extraction of antibodies and their application in bioanalysis. Since the antibodies are extracted from the yolks of laid eggs, the method of antibody production is non-invasive. Thus, no blood must be taken from the animals for the extraction of blood serum.

The available quantity of a given antibody is considerably increased through repeated egg laying from the same hen. The cross-reactivity of IgY with proteins from mammals is also markedly less than that of IgG. Furthermore, the immune response against certain antigens in chickens is more strongly expressed than in rabbits or other mammals.

Of the immunoglobulins arising during the immune response, only IgY is found in chicken eggs. Thus, in preparations from chicken eggs, there is no contamination with Immunoglobulin A (IgA) or Immunoglobulin M (IgM). The yield of IgY from a chicken egg is comparable to that of IgG from rabbit serum.

One disadvantage of IgY, as compared to mammalian antibodies, is that the isolation of IgY from egg yolk is more difficult than the isolation of IgG from blood serum. This is due in large part to the fact that IgY cannot be bound with Protein A and Protein G. Thus, it cannot be separated from other components of the assay, for example from other proteins. Additionally, the egg yolk's rich store of lipids and lipoproteins must be removed. Antibody-containing blood serums, on the other hand, can sometimes be directly used in bioanalysis, i.e., without complicated isolation steps.

== Utilization in foods ==
Particularly in Asian countries, IgY has been clinically tested as a food supplement and preservative. For example, yogurt products containing pathogen specific IgY, have been tested for their ability to reduce Helicobacter pylori in the stomach by hindering the attachment of the bacterium to the stomach lining. The IgY used for this purpose is extracted from the eggs of immunized hens. Antibodies against Salmonella and other bacteria, as well as against viruses, are produced in this manner, and employed as a nutritional component for protection against these pathogens. The Food Safety Lab of Ocean University of China has experimented with using IgY specific to the bacteria Shewanella putrefaciens and Pseudomonas fluorescens as a food preservative for fish. The shelf life of fish treated with the IgY was extended from 9 days to 12–15 days demonstrating a significant antimicrobial activity to the specific bacteria.

Anti-Fel d1 egg IgY immunoglobulin has been successfully tested to reduce active Fel d1 in cats saliva in order to lower allergenic potential of treated cats.

== Literature ==
- Rüdiger Schade, Irene Behn, Michael Erhard: Chicken Egg Yolk Antibodies, Production and Application. Springer-Verlag, Berlin 2001, ISBN 3-540-66679-6
- G.A. Leslie, L.W. Clem: Phylogeny of immunoglobulin structure and function. 3. Immunoglobulins of the chicken. In: Journal of Experimental Medicine. 130(6)/1969. Rockefeller University Press, S. 1337-1352, ISSN 0022-1007
- A. Polson, M.B. von Wechmar, M.H. van Regenmortel: Isolation of viral IgY antibodies from yolks of immunized hens. In: Immunological Communications. 9(5)/1980. Dekker New York, S. 475-493, ISSN 0090-0877
- A. Polson, M.B. von Wechmar, G. Fazakerley: Antibodies to proteins from yolk of immunized hens. In: Immunological Communications. 9(5)/1980. Dekker New York, S. 495–514, ISSN 0090-0877
