= Transnational governance =

Concept in transnationalism

Transnational governance refers to governance that applies beyond the boundaries of sovereign states while stopping short of full integration at the global level, or global governance. The state remains a key player in transnational governance but other actors from business, civil society, academia, amongst others, can play key roles in the development of global and regional policies as well as building structures of transnational administration. Within a European Union framework, it is both a subset of governance in general and an application of it to situations outside its usual limits of corporate or governmental hierarchies, whether regional or national. When such disparate hierarchies within the EU find common goals, typically within a conterminous geographic area, they seek to achieve them by integrating their various policies and activities. The goals of transnational governance, especially for areas previously divided by the Iron Curtain or pre-EU barriers to free trade and movement of peoples, is to foster economic and social development.

== Background ==
The economic development could be defined as the increase of wealth of a country or a region and the social development could be loosely defined as the improvements of quality of living for the population. Economic and social are, or at least should be, inseparable concepts. Why reach a high economic development if the inhabitants living in the area don't see any benefits of that improvement?

In the current global political and economic landscape, particularly within the backdrop of globalization, there is an increase in privatization. This means that business has started to play an important role in the international order. A related phenomenon called public-private partnerships (PPPs) is seen as an offshoot of this development.

Critics, however, cite that a dominance of the private sector and the global capital in the world today is dangerous since it tends to undermine international cooperation and equity among states. There is global consensus, therefore, regarding the need for transnational governance that can regulate and address the gaps on global issues and crises like poverty, climate change, disease, terrorism, and financial crises, among others. The state-centric Westphalian international order is unable to cope with these transnational threats, calling for multilateral collaboration that does not only involve states but also other international actors such as non-governmental organizations and multinational companies.

=== Social and economic impact ===
Reach social and economic developments are already a challenge but it's even more challenging in a transnational area such as the greater region. Some projects were created in order to foster these developments. The operational program Interreg IV A, “grande region” has for main objectives to make the greater region more attractive, encourage innovation, improve the numbers of high quality jobs, etc.

The improvement of the economic and social situation could be analysed through the example of the Vienna-Bratislava-Györ triangle which is a cross border area including three countries (Slovakia, Austria and Hungary) that were once part of the same empire. Good governance could lead to the adoption of a common identity which could lead to mutual support between people, companies or authorities sharing this common identity. Concretely, we observe a high amount of Foreign direct investments (FDI) coming from Austria in order to develop the general situation of Slokia and Hungary. This is very well descriptor in this citation of Tatzberger (2007) : “Foreign direct investments (FDI) play an important role in restructuring and improving the competitiveness of industry and manufacturing by helping to raise productivity and to expand exports. It has been one of the driving forces behind industrial restructuring in Hungary and Slovakia”.

However, it has to be said to huge economic and social disparities could be seen a real threat to the process leading to the creation of a common identity. For instance, the migration of workers stays underdeveloped because of Austrian fears and restrictions. On one side workers mobility is seen as an important force in enhancing economic integration of the region but on the other side it could lead to real changes in the social structure especially in Austria due to the migration of very low qualified workers. An important brain drain could also appear which will make highly decrease the number of educated people who could have been able to develop and teach regional strategic development plan.

== See also ==
- Governance
