= Network governance =

Organizational form

In business, non-profit and public sector settings, network governance is a form of interfirm or inter-agency coordination where "organic or informal" relationships are more dominant than the internal structures within organizations or their formalised contractual relationships. Network governance constitutes a "distinct form of coordinating economic activity" (Powell, 1990:301) which contrasts and competes with markets and hierarchies.

== Definition ==
Network governance involves a select, persistent, and structured set of autonomous firms (as well as nonprofit agencies) engaged in creating products or services based on implicit and open-ended contracts adapt to environmental contingencies and to coordinate and safeguard ex-changes. These contracts are socially—not legally—binding. As such, governance networks distinguish themselves from the hierarchical control of the state and the competitive regulation of the market in at least three ways:

1. In terms of the relationship between the actors, governance networks can be described as a pluricentric system as opposed to the unicentric system. Governance networks involve a large number of interdependent actors who interact with each other in order to produce an outcome.
2. In terms of decision-making, governance networks are based on negotiation rationality as opposed to the substantial rationality that governs state rule and the procedural rationality that governs market competition.
3. Compliance is ensured through trust and political obligation which, over time, becomes sustained by self-constituted rules and norms.

As a concept, network governance explains increased efficiency and reduced agency problems for organizations existing in highly turbulent environments. On the one hand, the efficiency is enhanced through distributed knowledge acquisition and decentralised problem-solving; on the other, the effectiveness is improved through the emergence of collective solutions to global problems in different self-regulated sectors of activity. Due to the rapid pace of modern society and competitive pressures from globalization, transnational network governance has gained prominence.

Network governance first depends on the comprehension of the short- and long-term global business risks. It is based on the definition of the IT key objectives and their influence on the network. It includes the negotiation of the satisfaction criteria for the business lines and integrates processes for the measurement and improvement of the global efficiency and end user satisfaction. Beyond that, it allows the constitution and piloting of internal teams and external partners as well as the setting up of a control system enabling to validate the performance of the whole. Finally, it ensures permanent communication at all the various management levels.

In the public sector, network governance is not universally accepted as a positive development by all public administration scholars. Some doubt its ability to adequately perform as a democratic governance structure while others view it as phenomenon that promotes efficient and effective delivery of public goods and services. Examining managed networks in health care, Ferlie and colleagues suggest that networks may be the 'least bad' form of governance addressing wicked problems, such as providing health care for the increasing number of older people.

== Types ==
Provan and Kenis categorize network governance forms along two different dimensions:

- Network governance may or may not be brokered. They refer to a network whose organizations interact with every other organization to decentralizedly govern the network "shared governance". At the other extreme a network may be highly brokered via centralized network brokers with only few and limited direct organization-to-organization interactions.
- Network may be participant governed or externally governed.

=== Participant-governed networks ===
In participant governance a network is governed by its members themselves.

They call such networks that involve most or all network members interacting on a relatively equal basis in the process of governance "shared participant governance".

=== Lead organization-governed networks ===
More centralized networks may be governed by and through a lead organization that is a network member.

== Examples of network governance ==
=== In history ===
- From the 10th to 13th centuries, merchants in Cairo begin forming a network of merchants who report to each other the intents and information on agents working for them, and collectively inflict sanctions on agents that perform poorly. This leads to a hub of trading formed in Cairo and Aden – this makes the information on the market conditions, and the reputation of various agents easier to access for the good of the whole.
- By the 12th century, Venice provides its merchants with an improved flow of information regarding the market conditions they face, as well as information on the practices of individual agents. This recording of information helps merchants make more informed business decisions.
- The formation of the English and Dutch East India companies formed a cooperation between merchants and companies to better regulate and inform others on the reputations of trading actors in London, Amsterdam and ports in East Africa and Arabia. This is a collective movement by governments and companies to raise capital for both the country and businesses.

Ron Harris, in his article "Reputation at the Birth of Corporate Governance", writes: "The questions of who had a good reputation and who had a bad one, whom one could trust and entrust money to, were unaltered, but the relationships to which they applied changed, as did the institutions that provided answers to these questions."

=== Modern examples ===
- Amber alert – In 1996 the Amber alert system was established in the United States after nine-year-old Amber Hagerman was kidnapped and murdered in Arlington, Texas. Media networks, in collaboration with law enforcement, joined a grassroots movement to spread the cause in establishing a network to aid in broadcasting alerts in an effort to prevent future crimes. This movement has grown to include all fifty states, and spread alerts across state lines. The Amber alert system has since been widely accepted as the first-response program for missing persons nationwide.
- Homeland Security Fusion Centers – After the September 11th attacks, the United States endeavoured to improve the coordination between national and local organizations concerned with security. The Department of Homeland Security and a Director of National Intelligence were implemented at the federal level in response to this problem. Soon after, states began creating their own networks to share information pertinent to homeland security. As a result, fusion centers have popped up in almost every state, as well as many regions. These fusion centers provide a hub for law enforcement agencies to collaborate on national security measures in an effort to promote transparency across agencies, whether it be at the state, local or federal level.
- In academic work concerning the construction industry, Eccles speaks of "quasi-firms", and draws on Williamson's transaction cost economics to consider how "a contracting mode intermediate between the relational contracting modes of bilateral governance (obligational contracting) and unified governance (internal organization)" can be "the preferred mode" for inter-firm governance in this industrial context.
- Leading European business schools joined with more than sixty multinationals to launch the Academy of Business in Society, the mission of which is to push CSR to the forefront of business practice. Their main activities in pursuing this goal are: 1) developing 'best-in-class' training practices and learning resources for businesses and corporate academies, 2) including the changing role of business in society in business education and 3) creating a global research bank on the role of business in society and delivering interdisciplinary research on CSR. This is an example of network governance using education to improve corporate social responsibility. Use of organization of networks in today's society is a valid means of moving forward in preserving the environment.

== Importance of governmental relations ==
Relationships among governing positions and governing institutions are absolutely vital for the success of the internal workings of the governments that aid the public. While federal, state, and local governments differ in their policies, they all work in coherence in order for the foundations to work efficiently. "Checks and balances" is a prime synonym when referring to intergovernmental relations. All participating parties of the government must adhere to specific guidelines in order to cultivate a fair and even playing field that is both beneficial and just to the population it affects. A primary principal in governmental relationships is the balance of power between the parties. The federal government has a large amount of control in terms of national security, national finances and foreign affairs. However, in order to balance that control, state-level governments have a significant voice in intrastate politics. Specific examples of state-level policies include topics such as state highways, borderlines, and state parks. This allows states to still have flexibility while bonding to national policy.

Unfortunately, creating relationships among different level governments and government agencies is a complicated, and often grueling process. However, many agencies make deals or compromise within the party in order to further benefit both institutions. For example, a state may fund a county in order to better the county roads because it could be a direct reflection of the state. Intra-governmental relations between agencies, state-level, local-level, and federal-level government must work together in order to prosper and create policies or laws that are beneficial to both the agencies and the public.

== Role in environmental governance ==
In the wake of apparent failures to govern complex environmental problems by the central state, "new" modes of governance have been proposed in recent years. Network governance is the mode most commonly associated with the concept of governance, in which autonomous stakeholders work together to achieve common goals.

The emergence of network governance can be characterised by an attempt to take into account the increasing importance of non-governmental organizations (NGOs), the private sector, scientific networks and international institutions in the performance of various functions of governance. Embedding interventions to make society better and to transform conflicts within "relational webs" can ensure better coordination with existing initiatives and institutions and greater local acceptance and buy-in, which makes the intervention more sustainable. Prominent examples of such networks that have been instrumental in forming successful working arrangements are the World Commission on Dams, the Global Environmental Facility and the flexible mechanism of the Kyoto Protocol. Another ongoing effort is the United Nations Global Compact, which combines multiple stakeholders in a trilateral construction including representatives from governments, private sector and the NGO community.

One main reason for the proliferation of network approaches in environmental governance is their potential to integrate and make available different sources of knowledge and competences and to encourage individual and collective learning. Currently, environmental governance faces various challenges that are characterised by complexities and uncertainties inherent to environmental and sustainable problems. Network governance can provide a means to address these governance problems by institutionalising learning on facts and deliberation on value judgements. For example, in the realm of global chemical safety, transnational networks have formed around initiatives by international organisations and successfully developed rules for addressing global chemical issues, many of which have been implemented by national legislations. Most notably, these transnational networks made it possible to avoid the institutional apathy that is typically found in political settings with many actors of conflicting interests, especially on a global level.

Through integration of actors from different sectors, governance networks are able to provide an innovative environment of learning, laying the way for adaptive and effective governance. One particular form of networks important to governance problems is epistemic communities in which actors share the same basic casual beliefs and normative values. Although participation in these epistemic communities requires an interest in the problem at stake, the actors involved do not necessarily share the same interest. In general, the interests are interdependent but can also be different or sometimes contesting, stressing the need for consensus building and the development of cognitive commodities.

The main argument in the literature for the advantage of network governance over traditional command and control regulation or, alternatively, recourse to market regulation, is its capacity to deal with situations of intrinsic uncertainty and decision-making under bounded rationality. This is typically the case in the field of global environmental governance where one has to deal with complex and interrelated problems. In these situations, network institutions can create a synergy between different competences and sources of knowledge allowing dealing with complex and interlined problems.

== Enhancement of corporate social responsibility ==
As increasing amounts of scientific data validate concerns about the deterioration of our environment, the role of non-governmental organizations (NGOs) in network governance is being utilized in ever-increasing ways to halt or at least slow this deterioration. One of the ways they are accomplishing this is by directing their activities to focus on improving corporate social responsibility (CSR). As a concept, CSR has existed since the first business was formed in civilization. The French philosopher Rousseau described it as the "social contract" between business and society. As theories about CSR have evolved in keeping with their times, today it is increasingly associated with sustainable practices and development, meaning that businesses have a "moral responsibility" to conduct their operations in an ecologically sustainable manner. It is no longer acceptable for corporations just to grow "the bottom line" and increase profits for their shareholders. Businesses remain free to pursue profits but are increasingly obligated to minimize their negative impact on the environment.

Network governance, in the form of NGOs, is effectively bringing to light "bad practices" by corporations, as well as highlighting those actively working to reduce their carbon footprints. Private governance networks such as CSRHUB and the Carbon Disclosure Project (CDP) are entities that hold corporations accountable for their amount of corporate social responsibility. Founded to accelerate solutions to climate change and water management, the CDP discloses information and data on water management, greenhouse gas emissions, and climate change strategies on over 3,000 companies worldwide. It is the only global climate change reporting system and encourages corporations to engage in "best practices" regarding environmental impact by making their formerly private or unknown environmental impact information available to anyone, including the general public. This information can be used (by a variety of entities) to make consumer purchase and investment decisions, formulate governmental as well as corporate policy, educate people, develop less harmful business methods for corporations and formulate action plans by environmental advocacy groups, to name a few. Lord Adair Turner, Chairman of the UK Financial Services Authority, explains how network governance enhances CSR: "The first step towards managing carbon emissions is to measure them because in business what gets measured gets managed. The Carbon Disclosure Project has played a crucial role in encouraging companies to take the first steps in that measurement and management path".

== See also ==
- Cyber manufacturing
- Multi-level governance
- Netocracy
- Network society
- Network economy
- Policy network analysis
- Social peer-to-peer processes
- Sharing economy
