= European Union Studies Association =

The European Union Studies Association (EUSA), founded 1988, is a scholarly and professional association with its focus on the European Union studies, the processes of European integration, and its transatlantic relations.

It notes valuable contributions to European Studies via various prizes including the EUSA Award for Lifetime Achievement in European Studies.

== Leadership ==
=== 2021-2023 Executive Committee ===
- Sara Wallace Goodman Chair
- Elaine Fahey
- Stephanie Hofmann
- Dan Kelemen (Chair 2024-2025)
- Sophie Meunier (Chair 2023-2024)
- Kaija Schilde
- Milada Vachudova
- Jae-Jae Spoon ex officio

=== EUSA Chairs from Inception to Present ===
- Glenda G. Rosenthal 1989–1990
- Roy H. Ginsberg 1990–1992
- Pierre-Henri Laurent 1992–1993
- Alberta Sbragia 1993–1995
- James A. Caporaso 1995–1997
- Gary Marks 1997–1999
- Vivien A. Schmidt 1999–2001
- Martin A. Schain 2001–2003
- George Ross 2003–2005
- John T.S. Keeler 2005–2007
- Liesbet Hooghe 2007–2009
- Adrienne Héritier 2009-2011
- Amie Kreppel 2011-2013
- Michelle Egan 2013-2015
- Alasdair Young 2015-2017
- Abe Newman 2017-2019
- Matthias Matthijs 2019-2021
- Sara Wallace Goodman 2021-2023
- Sophie Meunier 2023-2024
- Dan Kelemen 2024-2025

== Lifetime Achievement in European Studies Award winners ==
- 2023 Brigid Laffan
- 2021 Helen Wallace
- 2019 Vivien Schmidt
- 2017 George Ross
- 2015 James Caporaso
- 2013 Alberta Sbragia
- 2011 Jeremy Richardson
- 2009 Philippe C. Schmitter
- 2007 Fritz W. Scharpf
- 2005 Eric Stein
- 2001-2003 Stanley Hoffmann
- 1999-2001 Leon Lindberg
- 1997-1999 Ernst B. Haas
