= Old Slovakia =

1923 book

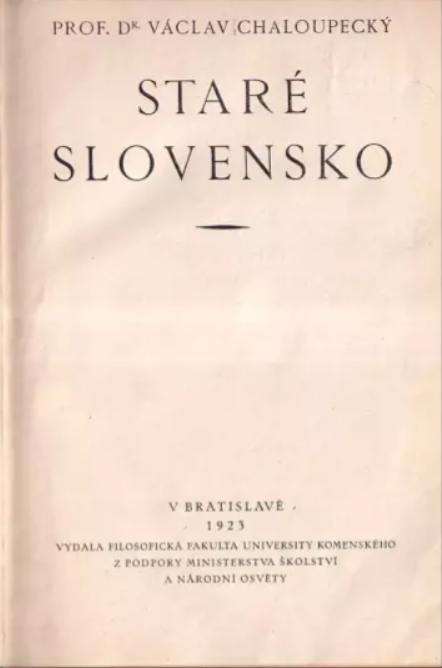
- Author: Václav Chaloupecký
- Original title: Staré Slovensko
- Language: Czech
- Genre: Non-fiction
- Publication date: 1923

Old Slovakia (Czech: Staré Slovensko, Slovak: Staré Slovensko) is a 1923 historic book about the early history of present-day Slovakia by prominent Czechoslovak historian Václav Chaloupecký. The book, especially his view on the early settlement structure, raised the most notable scholar dispute in interwar Slovakia.

== Background and content ==
The professional Slovak national historiography was de facto established only in the 20th century, after the foundation of Czechoslovakia. The first generation of professional historians came from the Czech lands because the school system in Slovakia was negatively affected by previous Magyarization. Czech scientists helped to establish Slovak academic institutions and to educate the first Slovak professional historians. On the other hand, they often supported the idea of Czechoslovakism what influenced also their professional views. In 1923, a prominent Czech historian Václav Chaloupecký published his work Old Slovakia. The book was the most extensive study about the history of present-day Slovakia between the 11th and the 13th century, when the territory belonged to the Kingdom of Hungary. Chaloupecký described its political development, the formation of administrative units, church institutions and monasteries. These research results were largely accepted also by later science.

Chaloupecký also described his views on the settlement of "Old Slovakia". The historic core of Old Slovakia, the Váh and Nitra valleys, was inhabited by "Czechs, it means Slavic tribes speaking the same language as was spoken in Bohemia and Moravia". (Note: One of arguments was a statement in Gesta Hungarorum about Boemi et Sclavi. This was interpreted by Chaloupecký as "Slavic Czechs" or "Czech Slavs".) The people living in the whole Western Slovakia were considered to be Czechs throughout the Middle Ages even though their language had some regional differences. The Eastern Slovakia was inhabited probably by Bulgarian Slavs, resp. by "Russians" (Eastern Slavs). The Central Slovakia was uninhabited until the colonization in the 13th century. Slovak dialects began to emerge only from the 13th century from a mixture of Slavic incomers - the region was colonized from the west, north and east by "Czechoslovak", Polish, "Russian" (Eastern Slavic) and Romanian population, respectively, in addition to German miners. His opinions about sparse settlement of Slovakia, size of continuous forest areas and ethnic identity of the population was later seen problematic from several perspectives.

== Dispute about Old Slovakia ==
Since the professional research in Slovakia was at the beginning, a qualified criticism of the study was missing. In 1930, Alexander Húščava published a work about colonization of Liptov in the 13th-14th centuries. According to Húščava who was influenced by his teacher Chaloupecký, Liptov was covered by deep forests and settled only in the 13th century. In 1933, Vladimír Šmilauer questioned the theory of Chaloupecký, because it was not compliant with his own research of toponymes. He found out that while Polish and Russian place names in Central Slovakia are missing, the names in the whole Slovakia (Western, Central and Eastern) are phonologically unified. He also observed that the Eastern and Western Slovak dialect were largely uniform in the 13th century what was unlikely to achieve in a short period. More, the adoption of Slavic place names by Hungarians could be explained easier and more naturally, if they came to the land already settled by the Slavs.

Chaloupecký a Húščava were then criticized by Daniel Rapant. His answer started the biggest scholar dispute in Slovakia ever. The disputes about the early settlement of Liptov, but also whole northern and central Slovakia became known as The Dispute about Old Liptov (Spor o starý Liptov) and The Dispute about Old Slovakia (Spor o staré Slovensko). The discussion involving other prominent historians and linguists have taken place in several journals in 1932–1934. Rapant, accused of national bias, was a strong supporter of Czech-Slovak collaboration and Czechoslovak state. However, he saw counterproductive to misinterpret the history in the name of Czechoslovakism and he rather preferred scientific objectivity. Rapant proved with the same material they had used that their views are untenable and even the contemporary state of research confirms that the situation in settlement was different. Chaloupecký's opinions were completely refuted by later historic, linguistic and archaeologic research. Already before the end of the 20th century (1996), 11 sites of fortified settlements and 38 other settlements from the 9th century have been unveiled on allegedly uninhabited territory along with another 40 linguistically reconstructed.
