= CNC (disambiguation) =

CNC typically refers to computer numerical control, the automated control of machining tools by computer.

CNC or cnc may also refer to:

== Companies ==
- China Netcom, a Chinese telecommunications provider
- China Xinhua News Network Corporation, state-run television news channel in China aimed at a foreign audience
- Community Newspaper Company, a former Massachusetts newspaper chain now part of GateHouse Media
- Corbeau News Centrafrique, a newspaper in the Central African Republic

== Government ==
- Cadet Nurse Corps, a World War II-era United States government program to train nurses
- Cantabrian Nationalist Council, a nationalist/left-wing party in Cantabria, Spain
- Centre national du cinéma et de l'image animée, a cinema regulatory agency under the French Ministry of Culture
- Ceylon National Congress, a former political party in Ceylon
- Chaldean National Congress, Iraqi political party
- Civil Nuclear Constabulary, a UK police force that guards nuclear installations
- National Congress of the Canaries, known in Spanish as Congreso Nacional de Canarias

== Education ==
- Centre for Neuroscience and Cell Biology, a bioscience and biomedicine research institute of the University of Coimbra
- Colegio Nacional de la Capital, a public high school in Asuncion, Paraguay
- College of New Caledonia, a post-secondary educational institution that serves the residents of the Central Interior of British Columbia
- Chippewa Nature Center, a private non-profit educational facility in Midland, Michigan

== Sports ==
- Haas CNC Racing, the original name of Stewart Haas Racing
- Collegiate National Championship (disambiguation)

== Other ==
- Cancer (constellation), astronomical constellation (IAU abbreviation Cnc)
- City Nature Challenge, an urban bioblitz competition
- Configurable Network Computing, a JD Edwards client-server architecture
- Consensual non-consent, a BDSM practice
- Crown Nominations Commission, a body involved in the appointment of Church of England bishops
- Czech National Corpus, a corpus of Czech language
- Coconut Island Airport, IATA airport code "CNC"

== See also ==
- C&C (disambiguation)
