= Anna Masaryková =

Czech art historian (1911–1996)

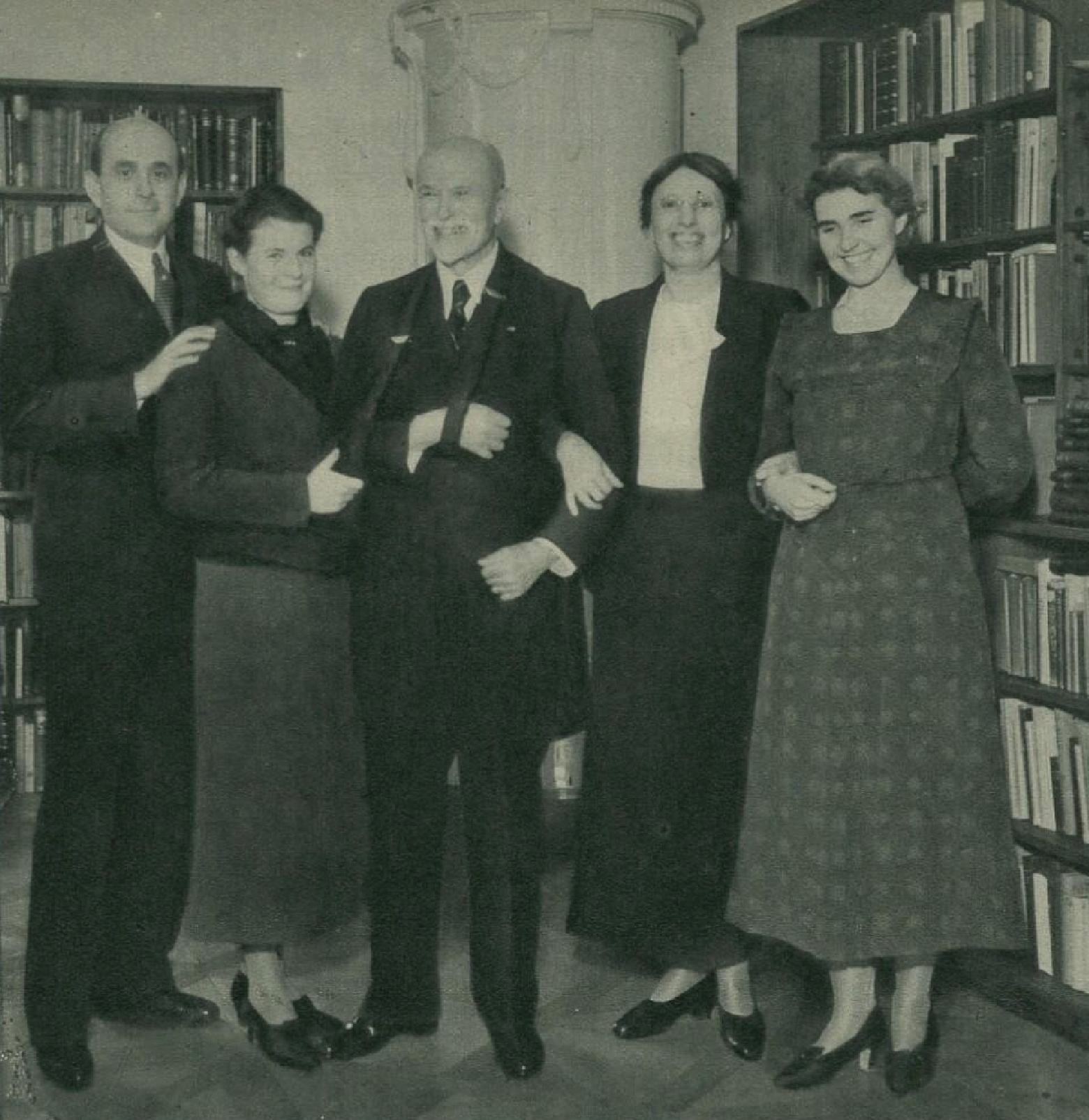
- from the left: Jan Masaryk, Anna Masaryková, Tomáš Masaryk, Alice Masaryková, and Olga Masaryková
- Born: 3 April 1911; Prague, Bohemia, Austria-Hungary
- Died: 18 March 1996 (aged 84); Prague, Czech Republic
- Burial place: Olšany Cemetery
- Education: Faculty of Arts, Charles University
- Occupations: art historian, archivist
- Partner: Herbert Masaryk (father)
- Honours: Honorary citizen of Prague

Anna Masaryková (3 April 1911 – 18 March 1996) was a Czech art historian and art critic. She was a long-time staff member of the National Gallery Prague.

== Early life and education ==
Masaryková was born on 3 April 1911 in Prague. After graduating from a grammar school in Prague (1930), she enrolled in the Faculty of Arts at Charles University. There, she studied Czechoslovak history under Josef Pekař, Josef Šusta, and Josef Václav Šimák; archaeology under Růžena Vacková; and comparative literary history. She also pursued studies in the humanities under Václav Matějka and V. Birnbaum. In 1936, she defended her comprehensive doctoral thesis titled: Druhé rokoko v Čechách (The Second Rococo in Bohemia).

== Career ==
Masaryková worked as an archivist at the Mánes Union of Fine Arts (1937–1942) and as a secretary at Volné směry. During the World War II, she published her work under the pseudonym Anna Briničová. From 1945 to 1970, she was employed at the National Gallery Prague; from 1945 to 1949, she served as the head of the Modern Art Department, until she was transferred to the archives in 1949 for political reasons. Following the Warsaw Pact invasion of Czechoslovakia, she worked only as an occasional, part-time assistant at the National Gallery between 1971 and 1984. In her attic apartment on Silná Street, she amassed a large collection of books primarily in the field of art history, her area of study. From the late 1980s and especially after 1989 she was actively involved in reviving the legacy of her grandfather Tomáš Masaryk.

== Work ==
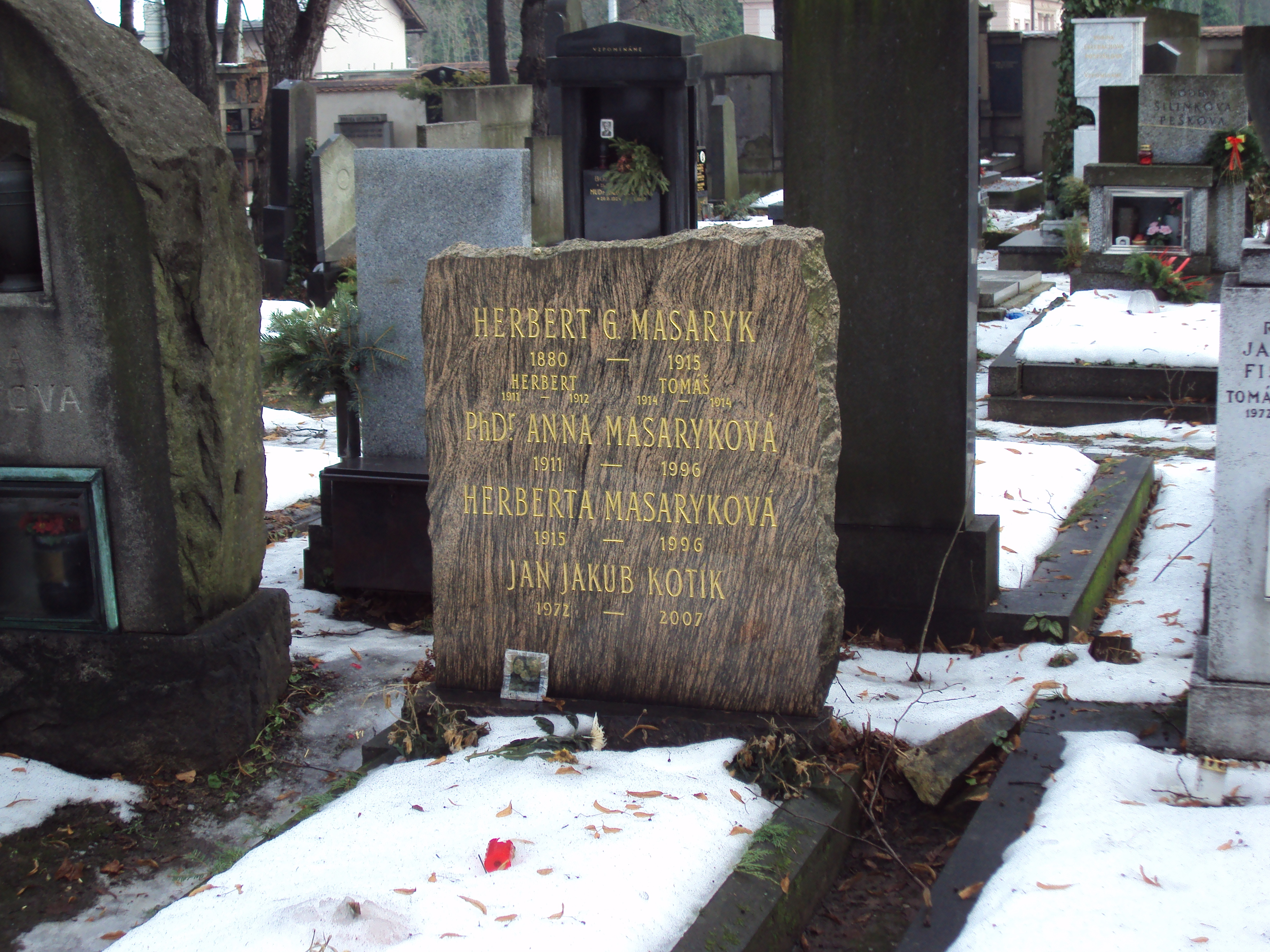
The Masaryk grave with father Herbert, sister Herberta, and her grandson J. J. Kotík

She authored, among other works, monographs on Jan Slavíček (1946) and Josef Mařatka (1958), and compiled a number of catalogs to which she also contributed theoretical studies (National Gallery, 5th Department: Czech Sculpture of the 19th and 20th Centuries, 1963). Her contribution to the understanding of female artists throughout history is significant.

=== Selected works ===
- Corot, Prague 1937
- Národní muzeum v Praze, Prague 1940
- Nové mlýny na Novém Městě pražském, Prague 1941
- Antonín Hudeček, Prague 1942 (under pseudonym A. Brynychová)
- Jan Slavíček, Prague 1946
- Delacroix, Prague 1947
- Josef Mařatka, Prague 1958
