= Czech Historical Review =

Scientific journal

- Discipline: History
- Language: English
- Edited by: Martin Holý

Publication details
- History: Since 1895
- Publisher: Institute of History of the Czech Academy of Sciences (Czech Republic)
- Frequency: Quarterly
- Open access: Yes

Standard abbreviations
- ISO 4: Czech Hist. Rev.

Indexing
- ISSN: 0862-6111 (print); 2570-9208 (web)

Links
- Journal homepage

The Czech Historical Review (Český časopis historický) is a peer-reviewed academic journal, publishing academic work in Czech, Slovak, and English. Its contributions feature studies in the field of Czech, Central European, and world history and occasionally interdisciplinary works with other sciences used also to study historical topics like archaeology. The journal also focuses on new theoretical and methodological approaches to the study of the past and includes a large book review and literature report section, focusing on the field's developments. All of the journal's issues from the year 2012 until present operate as open access and can be read in an online archive. Older issues can be found in the digital library of the Czech Academy of Sciences.

== History ==
The journal was established in 1895 by Jaroslav Goll and Antonín Rezek and was first published by the Czech Charles-Ferdinand University and Czech Academy of Sciences and Arts. The founders were also the journal's first editors-in-chief. Some other significant Czech historians and editors-in-chief of the Czech Historical Review included Josef Pekař and František Šmahel. After the Second World War, the ongoing existence of the journal was supported by the Czechoslovak Ministry of Education, Sciences and Arts. In 1953 the publication of the journal (then named Czechoslovak Historical Review/Československý časopis historický) recovered after three year long break and was assumed by the Institute of History of Czechoslovak Academy of Sciences, named the Institute of Czechoslovak and world history after its involvement in the Prague Spring. In 1993, following the Czechoslovakia split, the institution publishing the journal obtained its current name – the Institute of History of Czech Academy of Sciences.

== Publishing information ==
The journal publishes four issues per year. Every study is peer-reviewed using double-blind review approach. The journal is indexed in databases, such as Scopus. As of 2025, the editor-in-chief is Martin Holý (Institute of History of the Czech Academy of Sciences).
