= Zoe Hauptová =

Czech slavicist

- Born: 9 February 1929; Brno, Czechoslovakia
- Died: 23 January 2012 (aged 82); Prague, Czech Republic
- Education: Charles University
- Known for: Old Church Slavonic Dictionary
- Spouse: Petra Fisherová
- Scientific career
- Fields: Linguistics, Slavic studies
- Workplaces: Charles University, Jan Evangelista Purkyně University in Ústí nad Labem

Zoe Hauptová (9 February 1929 – 23 January 2012) was a Czech slavicist, palaeologist, editor, translator, lecturer and editor of the Old Church Slavonic Dictionary (from 1973, its chief editor).

== Early life and education ==
Hauptová was born in Brno and lived for a few years in Moravské Budějovice, before moving with her mother to Prague. She attended a French grammar school there, from which she graduated in 1948. She then began studying Czech and Polish at the Faculty of Arts, Charles University, before expanding her studies to Slavic philology in general, and particularly Old Slavonic, under the influence of linguistics professors Bohuslav Havránek, Vladimír Skalička, Vladimír Šmilauer and others who taught in the faculty at that time. She also studied at the Linguistic Institute of the Hungarian Academy of Sciences in Budapest. She earned a PhD in 1951, and a Candidate of Sciences in 1958.

== Career ==
In 1952, Hauptová was appointed as a researcher in the Slavonic Linguistics Department of the Slavonic Institute of the Academy of Sciences of the Czech Republic, and began working on the Old Church Slavonic Dictionary, published as separate volumes, totalling more than 3,000 pages, between 1966 and 1997. She became its chief editor in 1972. She also worked on the Old Slavonic Etymological Dictionary and the Old Church Slavonic Monuments. From 1995 to 2003, she was president of the Commission for Church Slavonic Dictionaries within the International Committee of Slavicists.

She lectured in paleoslavic and comparative Slavonic linguistics at the Pedagogical Faculty of the Jan Evangelista Purkyně University in Ústí nad Labem, where she obtained habilitation in 1990. She also taught at the Charles University in Prague. Two anthologies she co-edited, The Golden Age of Bulgarian Literature and The Writing of the Russian Middle Ages, are still indispensable for students of Slavic studies.

Among her research interests were general and comparative Slavonic studies; grammatical, lexicographic and textological studies of Old Church Slavonic; Slavic-Hungarian language relations, and Slavic history.

== Selected publications ==
- 1961 Hauptová, Zoe; Bechyňová, Věnceslava. Korespondence Pavla Josefa Šafaříka s Františkem Palackým. (Pavel Josef Safarik's correspondence with Frantisek Palacky.) Prague: Czechoslovak Academy of Sciences. OCLC 504371785
- 1980 Hauptová, Zoe. Byzantské legendy – výběr textů ze 4.–12. století. (Byzantine Legends - selection of texts from the 4th to the 12th century.) Prague.
- 1982 Hauptová, Zoe; Bechyňová, Věnceslava. Zlatý věk bulharského písemnictví (výbor textů od 10. do počátku 15. století). (The Golden Age of Bulgarian Literature (an anthology of texts from the 10th to the beginning of the 15th century).) Praha: Vyšehrad. OCLC 20496300
- 1989 Hauptová, Zoe; Bláhová, Emilie; Konzal, Václav. Písemnictví ruského středověku – Od křtu Vladimíra Velikého po Dmitrije Donského (výbor textů 11.–14. století). (The Writing of the Russian Middle Ages - From the Baptism of Vladimir the Great to Dmitry Donski (Anthology of 11th-14th Century Texts).) Praha: Vyšehrad. ISBN 9788070210161 OCLC 85648680
- 1997 Hauptová, Zoe; Večerka, Radoslav. Staroslověnská čítanka. (Reader in Old Church Slavonic.) Prague: Karolinum, Charles University. ISBN 9788024604787 OCLC 977377559

== Awards and recognition ==
- 1999 Paleoslovenica : in honorem Zoe Hauptová (Paleoslovenica: in honor of Zoe Hauptová), edited by Emilie Bláhová and Eva Šlaufová OCLC 320380506 ISBN 9788085494532
- Josef Dobrovský Medal, awarded by the Academy of Sciences of the Czech Republic, for her contribution to the development of Slavic philology

== Personal life ==
Her partner was painter and graphic artist Petra Fisherová. Hauptová sometimes worked as a lay preacher in the Czech Brethren church in Nejdek near Karlovy Vary. She died in Prague.
