= Centre for Medieval Studies, Prague =

Czech research centre

Centre for Medieval Studies
- Centrum medievistických studií
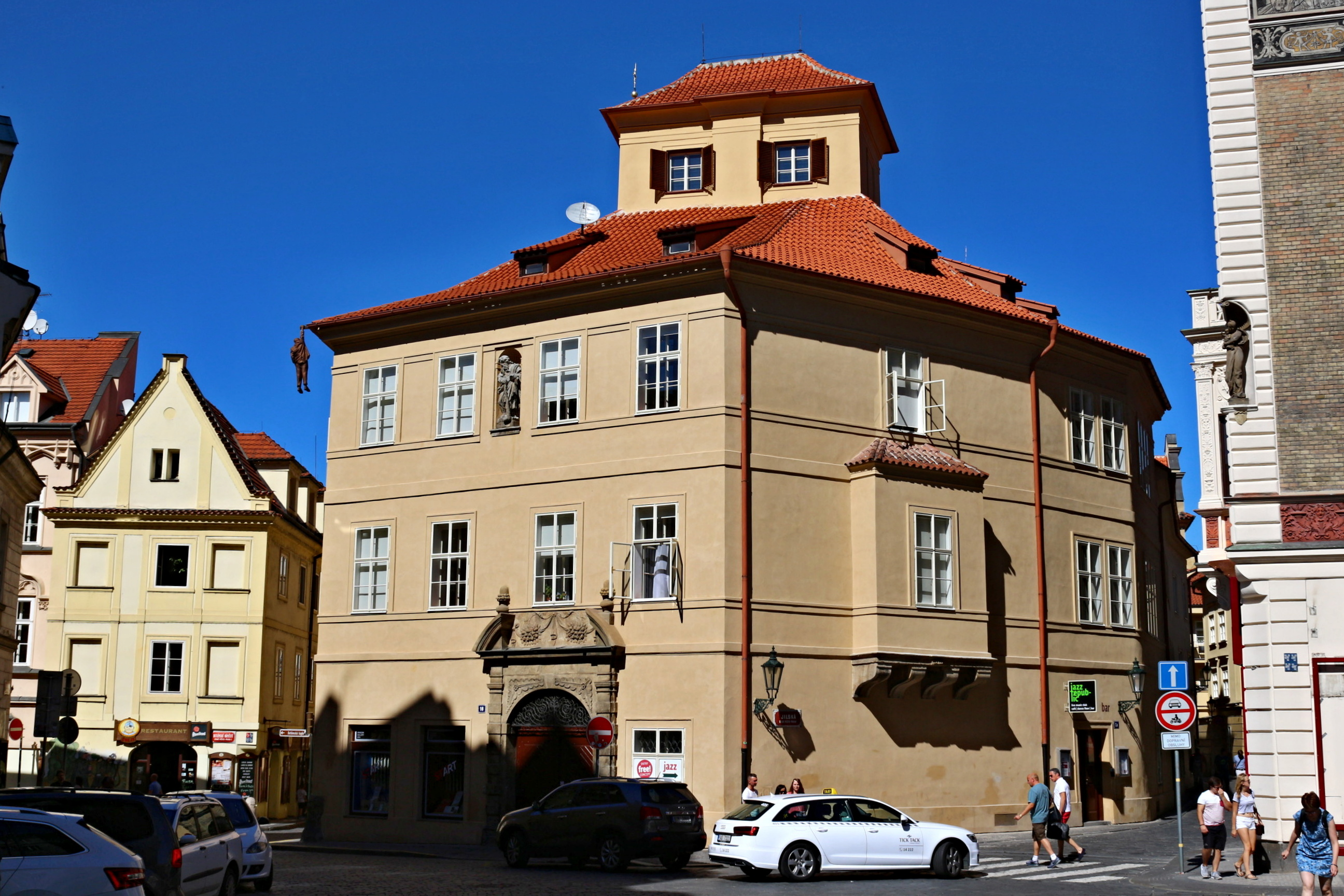
- Building housing the Centre for Medieval Studies in Prague's Old Town
- Type: Research institute
- Established: 1998
- Affiliations: Czech Academy of Sciences; Charles University
- Director: Pavel Soukup
- Location: Prague, Czech Republic
- Website: cms.flu.cas.cz

The Centre for Medieval Studies in Prague (Czech: Centrum medievistických studií; CMS) is a joint workplace of the Czech Academy of Sciences and Charles University located in Jilská 1 in the Old Town of Prague near St. Giles' Church.

== History and activities ==
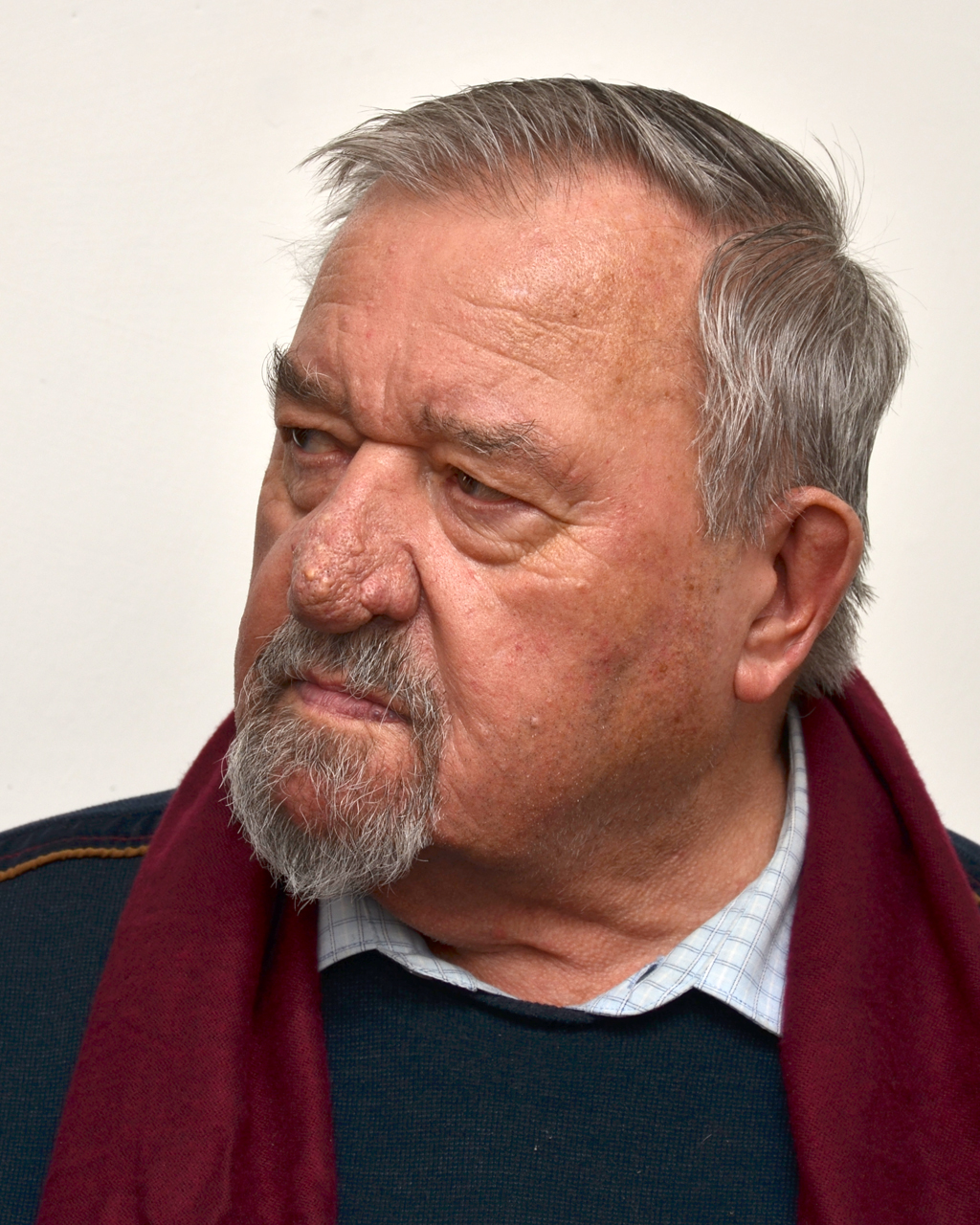
František Šmahel, the cofounder of CMS and its first director

The main objective of the Centre for Medieval Studies as laid down by its statute is to provide highly qualified support to doctoral and post-graduate students in all disciplines of the Medieval Studies, from general history to medieval archaeology, the auxiliary historical sciences, legal history, the history of philosophy, theology, literary history, and the art history, as well as in specialist philological and other disciplines.

A no less serious responsibility of the centre is represented by research and publication projects of an interdisciplinary nature, necessitating the pulling together of top professionals, specialised equipment and financial resources. It organises internal meetings and workshops with guests from the Czech Republic and abroad, and meetings for young scholars with an interdisciplinary orientation towards unconventional projects and approaches to research.

The library is open to all interested students and researchers. The Centre runs the Czech Medieval Sources online project which makes available editions of primary sources important for Czech medieval history for internet users. Since 2009, it publishes Studia Mediaevalia Bohemica (SMB), a biannual journal open to scholarly contributions in all fields related to the Middle Ages in Central Europe written in Czech, Slovak, English, German, Polish, or French.

== Directors ==
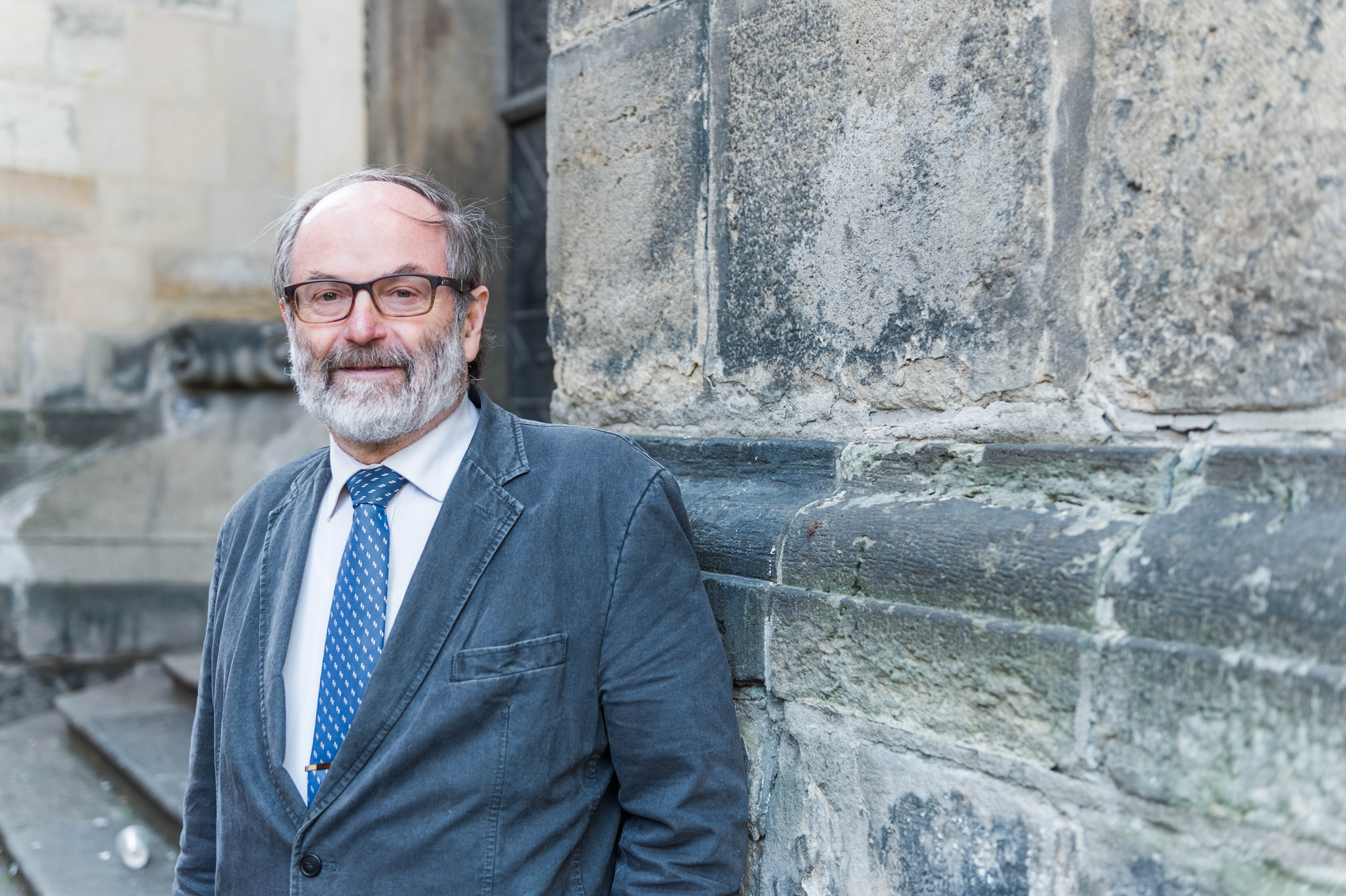
Petr Sommer, the cofounder of CMS and its second director

- František Šmahel (1998–2004)
- Petr Sommer (2004–2019)
- Pavel Soukup (current)
