= Privilegium pro Slavis =

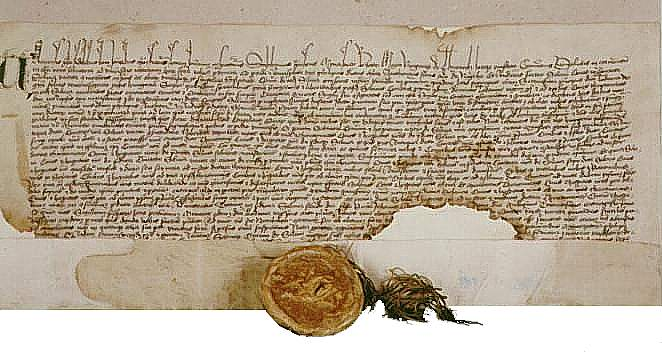
Privilegium pro Slavis

The Privilegium pro Slavis ("Privilege for the Slavs" (Note: Privilegium pro Slavis is not the contemporary name, but the term introduced to historiography by Czech historian Václav Chaloupecký. The Latin language does not distinguish between Slavs and Slovaks and both translates as S(c)lavi. In this case, the privilege was granted to the Slovak citizens of Žilina.)) is a privilege granted to the Slovaks in Žilina. (German: Sillein; Hungarian: Zsolna), Kingdom of Hungary, by the King Louis I during his visit there in 1381. According to this privilege, Slovaks and Germans each occupied half of the seats in the city council and the mayor should be elected each year, alternating between those nationalities. It was issued after the complaints of Slovak citizens that the Germans refused to respect this old custom. The privilege was preserved from duplication in 1431.

== Bibliography ==
- Kirschbaum, Stanislav J. (1995). A history of Slovakia : the struggle for survival. New York: St. Martin’s Press. ISBN 978-0-312-16125-5.
- Marsina, Richard (2002). "Žilina vo víre dejín" [Žilina in the turbulence of history]. In Marsina, Richard; Štanský, Peter (eds.). Žilina v slovenských dejinách (in Slovak). Žilina: Knižné centrum. ISBN 80-8064-158-7.
- Bartl, Július (2002). "K postaveniu Žiliny ako mesta na kráľovskej pôde" [To the position of Žilina - as the town built on royal land]. In Marsina, Richard; Štanský, Peter (eds.). Žilina v slovenských dejinách (in Slovak). Žilina: Knižné centrum. ISBN 80-8064-158-7.
