= Josef Beneš =

Czech linguist

Josef Beneš (11 January 1902 – 17 December 1984) was a Czech linguist, specialising in anthroponymy and onomastics.

== Life ==
Beneš was born on 11 January 1902 in Prachatice, Bohemia, Austria-Hungary. He was born into a family of opticians and initially trained as an optician. However, his parents allowed him to study at the gymnasium in Prachatice. In 1926–1930, he studied Bohemistics and Germanistics at the Charles University in Prague. Later, he worked in several places as a teacher in schools providing secondary education, including Prachatice, Mukachevo, Soběslav, Kladno and Prague.

After World War II, Beneš briefly worked at the Ministry of Education, then returned to teaching. From the beginning of the 1960s, he lectured at pedagogic institutes in Liberec and Ústí nad Labem. After 1968, as a result of normalization and changing political conditions in Czechoslovakia, he was forced to retire. Beneš died on 17 December 1984 in Prague.

Beneš belongs, together with Vladimír Šmilauer, Jan Svoboda and Antonín Profous, among the founders of Czech anthroponymy and onomastics.

== Selected works ==
Since 1933, Beneš published articles about Czech surnames in specialised journals (as Naše řeč or Zpravodaj místopisné komise ČSAV, ZMK). In 1962 he published book About Czech Surnames. His daughter, Dobrava Moldanová (born 1936), collected many of his articles into book Our Surnames (1983). Posthumously German Surnames of Czechs was published in 1998, with Marie Nováková as an editor.

- O českých příjmeních ('About Czech Surnames'), Prague, 1962 and 1970
- Naše příjmení ('Our Surnames'), edited by Dobrava Moldanová, 1983, Mladá fronta, Prague. Reprint in 2004, ISBN 80-86781-03-8.
- Německá příjmení u Čechů ('German Surnames of Czechs'), by Jan Evangelista Purkyně University in Ustí nad Labem, Ústí nad Labem, 1998, ISBN 80-7044-212-3
