= Milada Paulová =

Czech historian, Byzantologist and professor (1891 –1970)

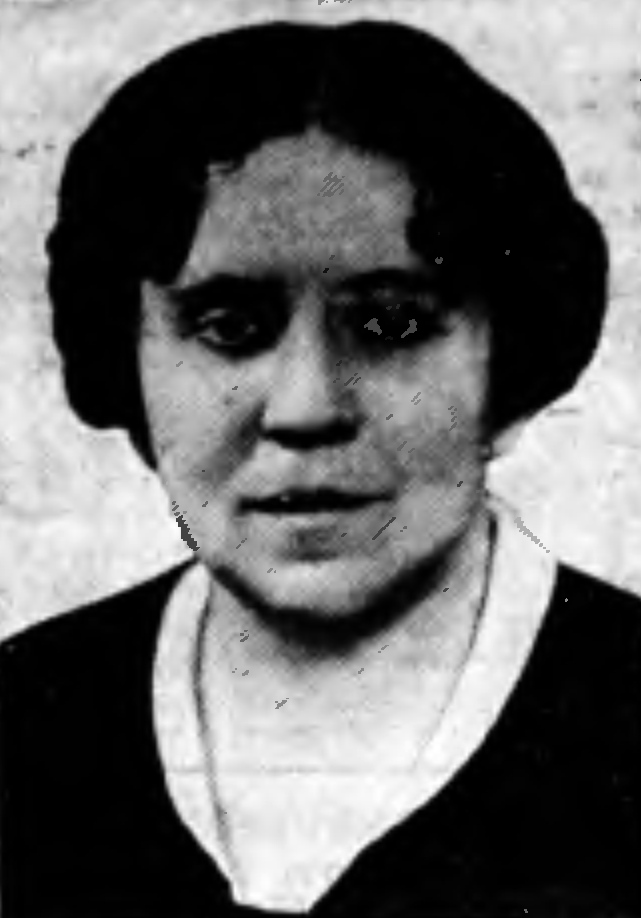
Milada Paulová

Milada Paulová (2 November 1891 – 17 January 1970) was a Czech historian and Byzantologist, and the first female professor at Charles University, Prague.

== Early life and education ==
Paulová was born in Loukov in Bohemia. Her mother died when she was three years old, and her father was the director of a sugarcane factory. When the factory went bankrupt, the family moved to Prague, where she completed her education at the teachers' school for girls. As the leaving exam for this school was not recognized by the university, she studied independently to take the final exam for Prague Grammar School, which she passed.

She studied History and Geography at the Faculty of Arts at Charles University, graduating in 1918 with a doctorate in philosophy. She was the second woman to receive this degree, after Alice Masaryková.

== Career ==
After graduating, Paulová worked at the Faculty of Arts, Charles University as an academic assistant, the first woman to hold this position, and in this role she travelled to Yugoslavia to collect documentation regarding the role of Yugoslav and Czech émigrés in World War I. In 1919, she also joined the National Library of the Czech Republic, where she continued to work until 1935.

In 1925, Paulová was made assistant professor of History of Eastern Europe and the Balkans, the first woman in Czechoslovakia to achieve this title. She was appointed Special Professor in 1934 and Regular Professor in 1945.

Paulová spent much of her time on research trips to Yugoslavia, France and the United Kingdom. She was the author of several books on the history of Yugoslavia, the Czechoslovak-Yugoslavian relations, and Byzantium. Paulová was the editor-in-chief of the journal Byzantinoslavica from 1946 until 1953.

== Awards and honours ==
Paulová was the first woman to be elected as an extraordinary member of the Royal Bohemian Society of Sciences (1929) and the Czech Academy of Sciences and Arts (1946). At the 12th Congrès International des Études Byzantines in 1961, Paulová was named honorary vice-president of the Association Internationale des Études Byzantines.

An exhibition on Paulová's career was held at the National Library of the Czech Republic in 2012 to mark 120 years since her birth.

The Milada Paulová Award is given out by the Czech Ministry of Education, Youth and Sports in recognition of the lifelong achievements of women researchers in the Czech Republic.
