= Faculty of Arts, Charles University =

Faculty of Charles University in Prague

Faculty of Arts
- Filozofická fakulta
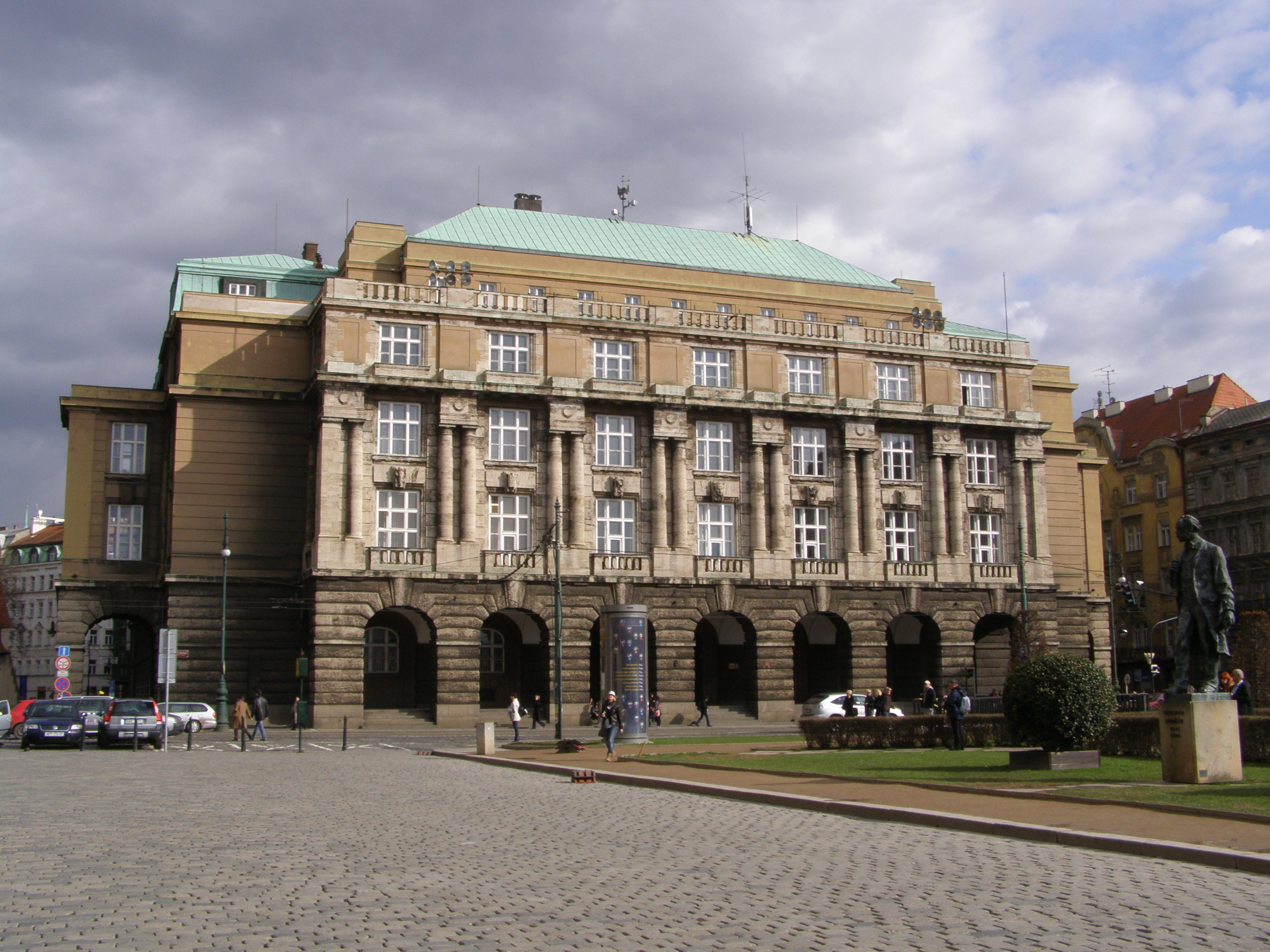
- The main building of the Faculty of Arts in the Old Town of Prague.
- Former name: Artistická fakulta
- Type: Faculty
- Established: 1348
- Affiliations: Charles University in Prague
- Dean: Eva Lehečková
- Students: ca. 9,000 (ca. 13,500 including U3A and other courses)
- Undergraduates: ca. 5,000
- Postgraduates: ca. 2,200
- Doctoral students: ca. 1,500
- Location: Prague, Bohemia, Czech Republic
- Website: www.ff.cuni.cz

The Faculty of Arts, Charles University (Czech: Filozofická fakulta Univerzity Karlovy), is one of the original four faculties of Charles University in Prague. When founded, it was named the Faculty of the Liberal Arts or the Artistic Faculty. The faculty provides lectures in the widest range of fields of the humanities in the Czech Republic, and is the only university faculty in Europe which provides studies in all the official languages of the European Union. The faculty has around 1,000 members of staff, over 9,000 students, and a flexible system of more than 700 possible double-subject degree combinations.

== History ==
The faculty was founded as the Faculty of Liberal Arts of Charles University by Emperor Charles IV on April 7, 1348, part of the emperor's attempt to establish the Kingdom of Bohemia as the permanent centre of the Holy Roman Empire and to place greater emphasis on the development of learning and culture in Prague. At that time, students attended the Faculty of Liberal Arts to receive education primarily in rhetorics and philosophy, later going on to pursue other subjects. The Faculty of Liberal Arts soon became the largest part of the university. In 1366, Emperor Charles IV endowed it with the first Prague college, the Collegium Carolinum; as part of the college, the first library of the artistic faculty was established, of manuscripts donated by the king.

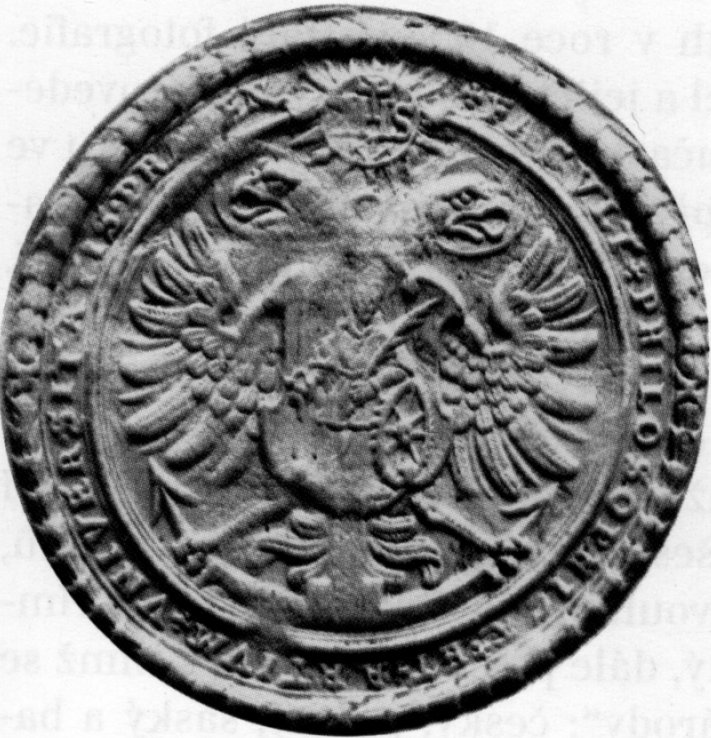
Seal of the Faculty of Arts from the second half of the 17th century

Following the Hussite wars, the Faculty of Liberal Arts became the nucleus of the university for two centuries. From the 17th century, the faculty was known as the Faculty of Arts and, until the middle of the 19th century, its programme served as a compulsory preparatory higher education for future students of all the other faculties.

From the 18th century, as well as philosophy, the faculty offered programmes in aesthetic theory, pedagogy, mathematics, astronomy, natural sciences, engineering sciences, economy, and history. These were complemented in the 19th century by oriental studies, archaeology, religious studies, and philology. Study of languages such as Czech, Italian, French, and Hebrew, and their respective literature and culture, also began to develop. Following the liberalization of the academic environment in the second half of the 19th century, the faculty started to accept women students in 1897.

The faculty was divided into Czech and German parts in 1882, and the Faculty of Natural Sciences became a separate institution between 1920 and 1939. In 1939, the school was closed by the occupying forces of Nazi Germany, and brutal persecution of teachers and students followed. Following the end of the occupation in 1945, the Faculty of Arts flourished again for a few years; this was forcibly terminated in 1948 by the Communist coup in 1948. The prestige of the faculty rapidly decreased as a result of the forced departure of numerous respected teachers and the introduction of Marxist–Leninist studies. In the 1960s, the faculty slowly began to open to prominent thinkers of the time, but this trend was reversed by the Soviet occupation in 1968, which Jan Palach, a student of the faculty, protested against by setting himself on fire. After the end of the Communist regime in Czechoslovakia in 1989, and the departure of its representatives in the faculty, it was re-established as one of the country's most highly regarded university institutions.

On 21 December 2023, a mass shooting occurred at the faculty claiming 15 lives including the perpetrator, David Kozák.

== Organization of study ==
=== Degree programmes ===
All study programmes comply with the Bologna system and are structured into the BA, MA and doctoral (Ph.D.) stages. Study programmes may be in single-subject or double-subject form, some are available in either single-subject or double-subject form. The standard length of study is 3–4 years in the BA programme and 2–3 years in the follow-up MA programme. After finishing their MA studies, graduates may apply for a doctoral study programme. The doctoral study programme which offers the award of Ph.D. requires completion of a doctoral programme, Ph.D. finals and dissertation defence.

=== Other programmes ===
Beside the degree programmes, the Faculty offers a number of short-term courses or summer schools and long-lasting education to its students, visiting students or the general public. For example, the East and Central European Studies Programme (ECES) is a semester-long programme with instruction in English, designed for international students of the Faculty of Arts. The Faculty also organises the Summer School of Slavonic Studies.

== Faculty activities ==
As of 2008, the total number of students is over 8,000; 7,040 studying for Master or bachelor's degrees, and 1,701 for a doctoral degree. The faculty is composed of 46 basic working units and six specialized working units, as well as two scholarly research institutes (the Czech Institute of Egyptology and the Institute of the Czech National Corpus). Each year authors of the faculty publish an average of 35 book titles.

The faculty participates in a number of international exchange programmes, including LLP Erasmus, the Central European Exchange Program for University Studies (CEEPUS), AKTION, exchange programmes under the auspices of the Visegrad Fund, and governmental scholarships. The number of visiting students within the LLP Erasmus programme was 280 in 2008.

=== Philology ===
Courses at the faculty are offered in more than 50 languages, as well as the literature, history, and cultural background associated with them. These include:

- Albanian
- Akkadian
- Arabic
- Armenian
- Avestan
- Azerbaijani
- Basque
- Bengali
- Bulgarian
- Catalan
- Church Slavonic
- Croatian
- Czech (for Czechs; as a foreign language; for the hearing-impaired)
- Chinese language(s)
- Danish
- Dutch
- Eblaite
- Ancient Egyptian
- English
- Finnish
- French
- German
- Gothic
- Greek (Ancient, Modern)
- Hebrew (Biblical, Medieval, Modern)
- Hindi
- Hittite
- Hungarian
- Icelandic
- Irish
- Italian
- Japanese
- Korean
- Latin
- Lithuanian
- Latvian
- Lusatian Sorbian
- Macedonian
- Mongolian
- Norwegian
- Old Irish
- Old Norse
- Persian
- Polish
- Portuguese
- Romani (North Central, Vlax)
- Romanian
- Russian
- Sanskrit
- Slovak
- Slovenian
- Serbian
- Spanish
- Swedish
- Tamil
- Tocharian
- Tibetan
- Turkish
- Ugaritic
- Ukrainian
- Vietnamese
- Yiddish

== Notable alumni and academics ==
=== Alumni ===
- Michal Ajvaz (born 1949), writer
- Edvard Beneš (1884–1948), president of Czechoslovakia (1935–38; 45–48)
- Anna Binder-Urbanová (1912–2004), rescuer of Jews, awarded "Righteous Among the Nations"
- Bernard Bolzano (1781–1848), Bohemian mathematician and theologian
- Karel Čapek (1890–1938), Czech writer and journalist, who first used the word robot to denote fictional automata
- Václav Černý, Czech literary historian and theorist, specialising in romance and Czech studies
- Ladislav Fuks (1923–94), writer
- Tomáš Garrigue Masaryk (1850–1937), founding president of Czechoslovakia (1918–35)
- Jaroslav Goll, Czech historian
- Zoe Hauptová, Czech slavicist, palaeologist, translator, lecturer and chief editor of the Old Church Slavonic Dictionary
- Bohuslav Havránek (1893–1978), literary theorist of the Prague Linguistic Circle
- Jaroslav Heyrovský (1890–1967), chemist, inventor of the polarographic method, and Nobel laureate in Chemistry 1959
- Bedřich Hrozný (1879–1952), Czech archaeologist and language scholar who deciphered Hittite cuneiform
- Jan Hus (c.1370-1415), 15th-century Czech religious reformer
- Alois Jirásek (1851–1930), writer
- Josef Jungmann (1773–1847), linguist, and one of the creators of modern Czech language
- Milan Machovec (1925–2003), philosopher, organized international Christian-Marxist dialogue at the Faculty in the 1960s
- Alice Masaryková (1879–1966), sociologist and politician, founder of social education in Czechoslovakia
- Zdeněk Matějček (1922–2004), psychologist, author of ground-breaking studies in children's psychology
- Vilém Mathesius (1882–1945), literary theorist of the Prague Linguistic Circle
- Jan Mukařovský (1891–1975), literary theorist of the Prague Linguistic Circle
- Jan Palach (1948–69), student who immolated himself in protest against the Soviet invasion of 1968
- Jan Patočka (1907–77), philosopher and intellectual leader of the Charter 77 protest movement
- Milada Paulová (1891–1970), historian and Byzantologist, first female professor at Charles University
- Josef Pekař, Czech historian
- Vladimír Skalička (1909–1991), literary theorist of the Prague Linguistic Circle
- Josef Škvorecký (1924–2012), writer
- Milan Rastislav Štefánik (1880–1919), politician
- Růžena Vacková (1901–82), art historian and archaeologist
- René Wellek (1903–1995), literary theorist of the Prague Linguistic Circle
- Anna Masaryková (1911–1996), art historian

=== Academics ===
- Tomáš Halík, professor of sociology, priest and writer, awarded the Andrew Elias Human Tolerance Award "for outstanding services towards propagating the values of tolerance and freedom of spirit and thought" In June 2002
- Martin Hilský MBE, writer and translator of Shakespeare's plays and poems into Czech. In 2002 he was awarded the Tom Stoppard Prize for his essays on Shakespeare
- Petr Sommer, archaeologist and historian of the Middle Ages.
- Miroslav Verner, archaeologist, Egyptologist and epigrapher, member of the UNESCO committee for ancient Egyptian antiquities, of the German Archaeological Institute and of the directorial board of the International Association of Egyptologists.
