= Loukovec =

- Municipality
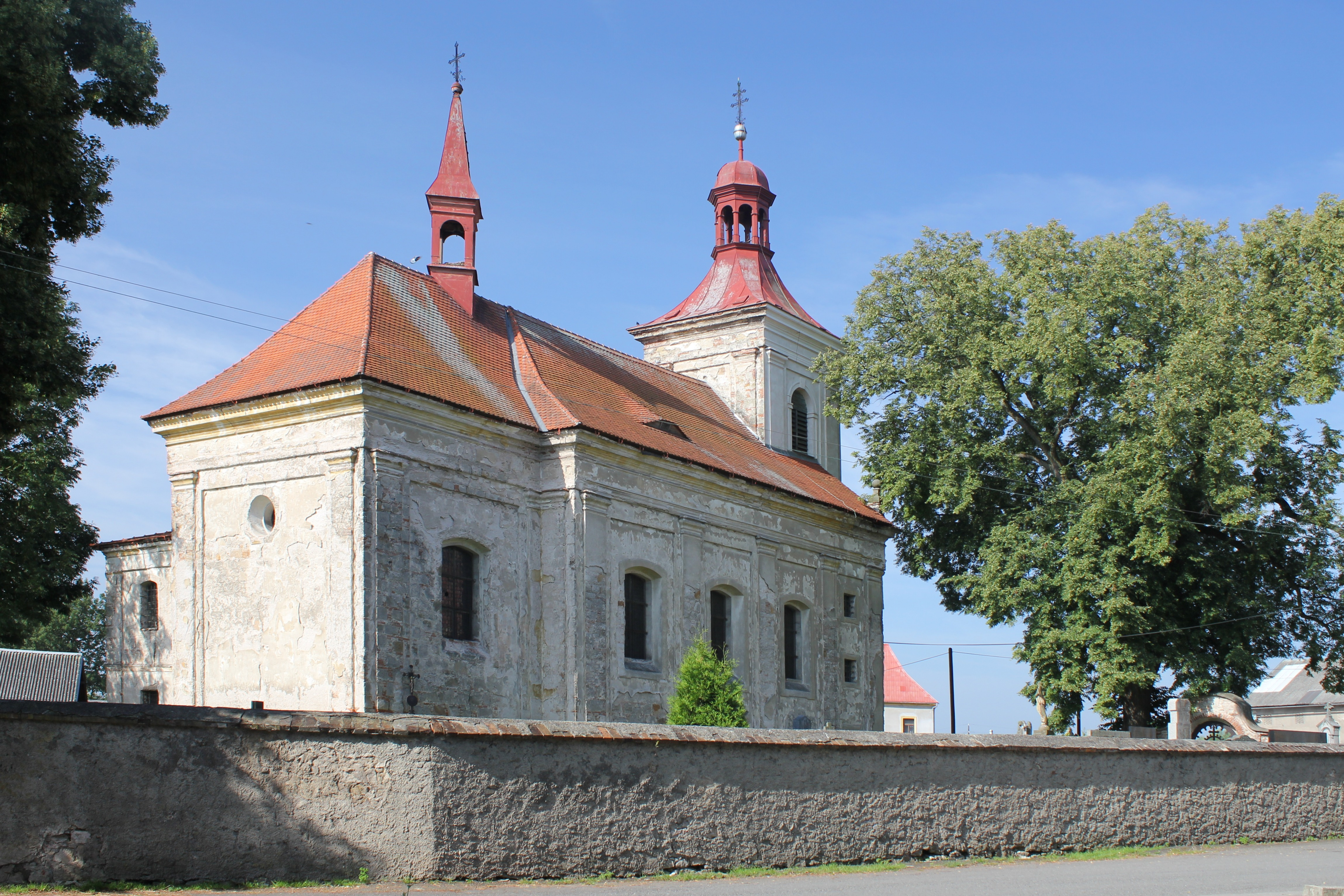
- Church of the Exaltation of the Holy Cross

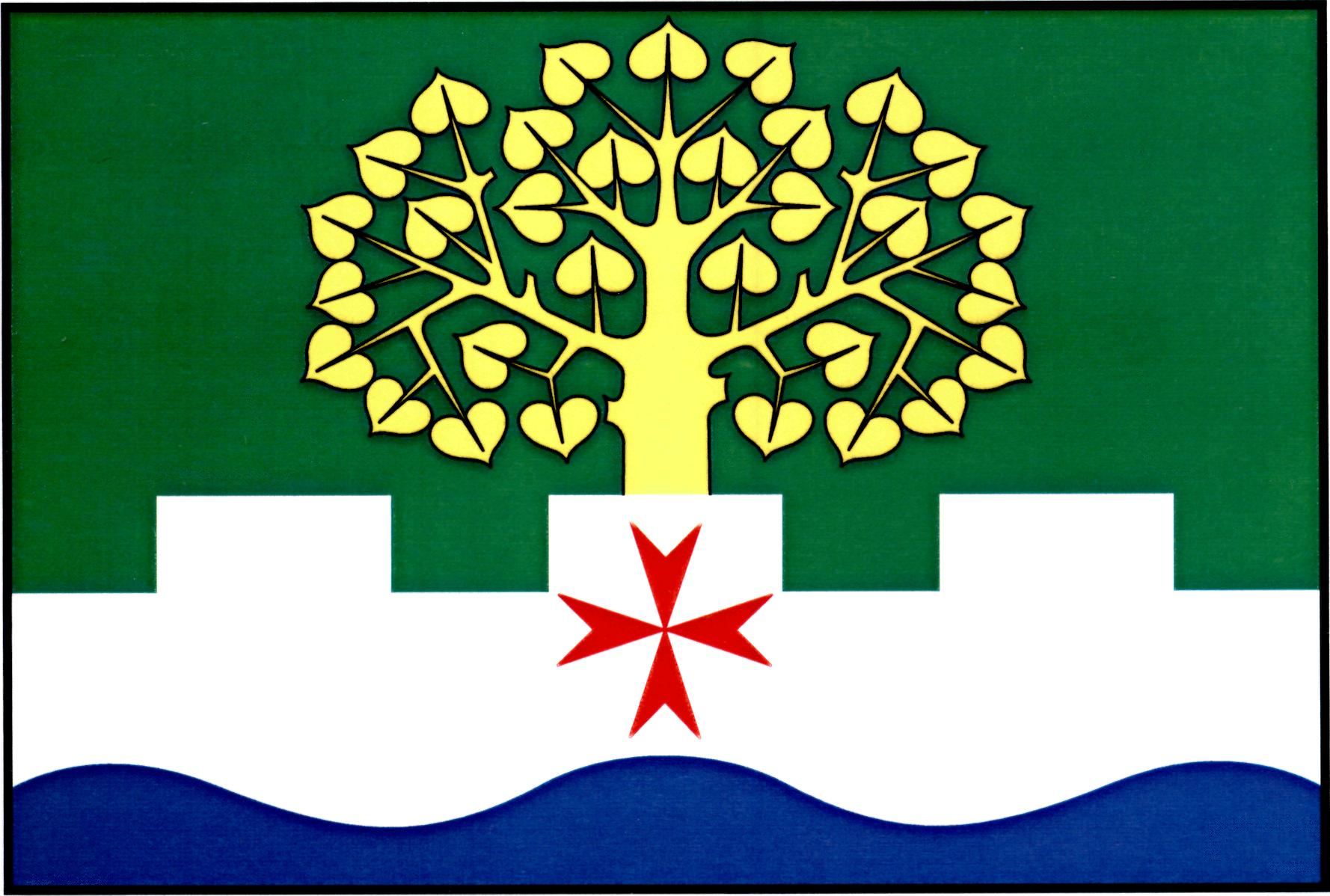
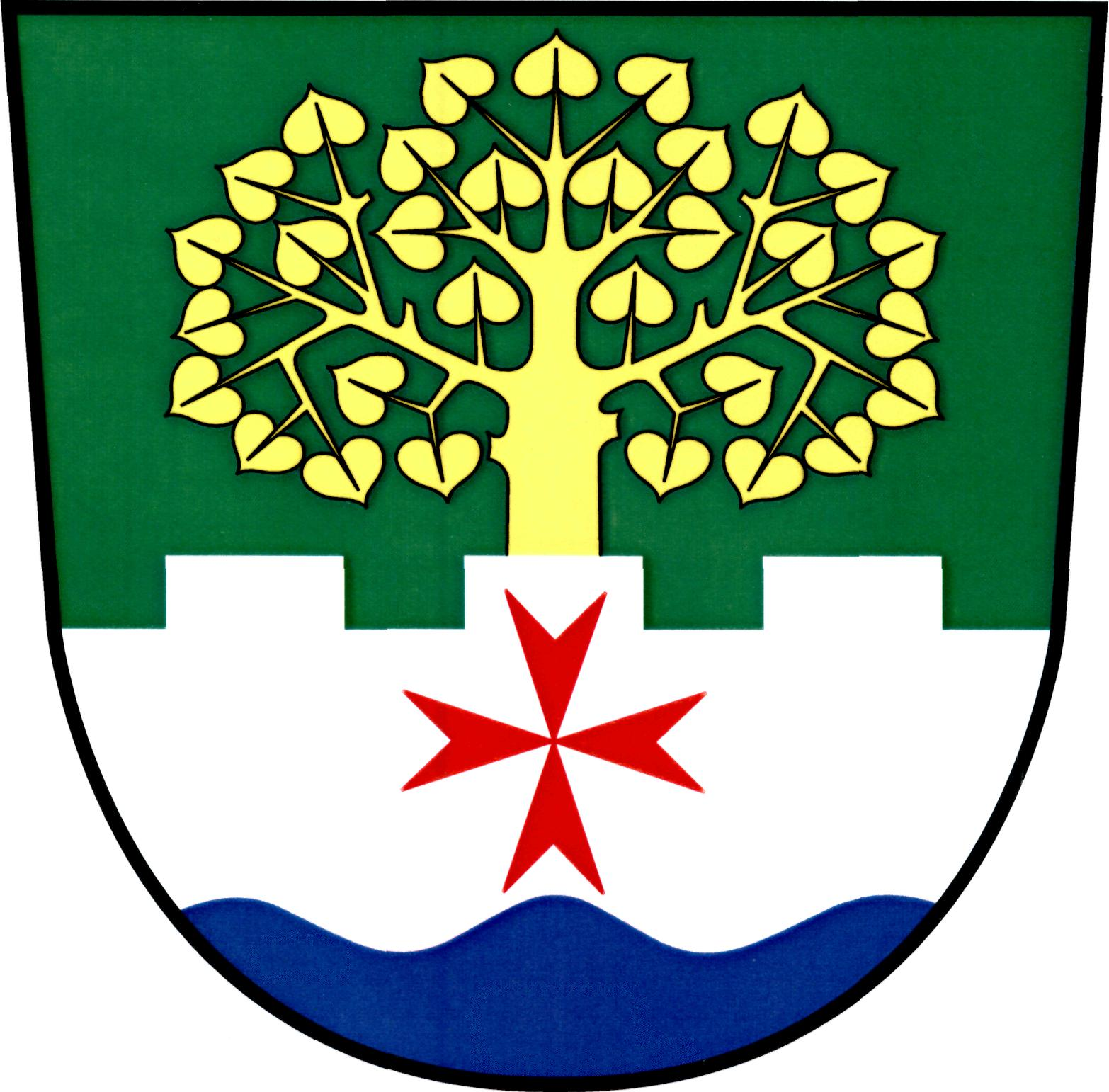
- Flag Coat of arms

- Location in the Czech Republic
- Coordinates: 50°33′43″N 15°0′57″E
- Country: Czech Republic
- Region: Central Bohemian
- District: Mladá Boleslav
- First mentioned: 1225

Area
  - Total: 2.86 km^{2} (1.10 sq mi)
- Elevation: 267 m (876 ft)

Population (2026-01-01)
  - Total: 398
  - Density: 139/km^{2} (360/sq mi)
- Time zone: UTC+1 (CET)
  - Summer (DST): UTC+2 (CEST)
- Postal code: 294 11
- Website: loukovec.cz

Loukovec is a municipality and village in Mladá Boleslav District in the Central Bohemian Region of the Czech Republic. It has about 400 inhabitants.

== Administrative division ==
Loukovec consists of two municipal parts (in brackets population according to the 2021 census):

- Loukovec (320)
- Hubálov (41)

== Etymology ==
The name is a diminutive form of Loukov. The name Loukov was derived from the personal name Louka (in old Czech written as Lúka), meaning "Louka's/Lúka's (court)".

== Geography ==
Loukovec is located about 17 kilometres (11 mi) north of Mladá Boleslav and 22 km (14 mi) south of Liberec. It lies in the Jičín Uplands. The highest point is at 275 m (902 ft) above sea level. The municipality is situated on an elevated plateau on the right bank of the Jizera River.

== History ==
The first written mention of Loukovec is from 1225. Among the most important owners of the village were the Berka of Dubá family, who owned Loukovec from 1541 to 1640, and the Waldstein family, who ruled the village from 1721 to 1820.

== Demographics ==
Historical population

Year	Pop.	±%
1869	505	—
1880	467	−7.5%
1890	477	+2.1%
1900	473	−0.8%
1910	522	+10.4%

Year	Pop.	±%
1921	448	−14.2%
1930	459	+2.5%
1950	346	−24.6%
1961	336	−2.9%
1970	319	−5.1%

Year	Pop.	±%
1980	293	−8.2%
1991	252	−14.0%
2001	271	+7.5%
2011	250	−7.7%
2021	361	+44.4%

Source: Censuses

== Transport ==
There are no railways or major roads passing through the municipality.

== Sights ==
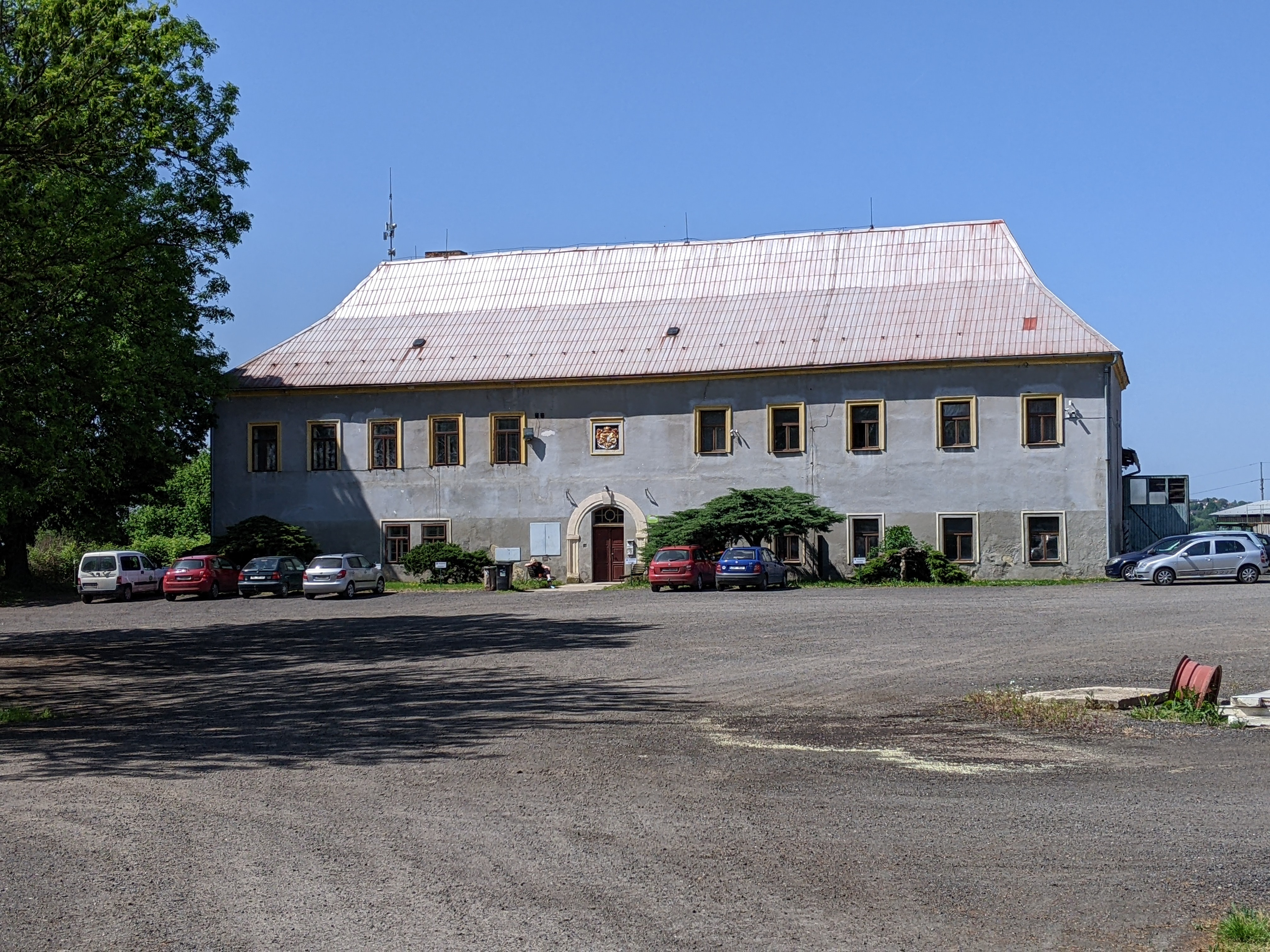
Loukovec Castle

The main landmark of Loukovec are the castle and the church. The Loukovec Castle was originally a medieval fortress, rebuilt into the Renaissance castle. At the end of the 17th century, it was modified in the Baroque style. Today the building is privately owned and inaccessible to the public.

The Church of the Exaltation of the Holy Cross is located next to the castle. It was built in the Baroque style in 1726.
