= Václav Chaloupecký =

Czech historian (1882-1951)

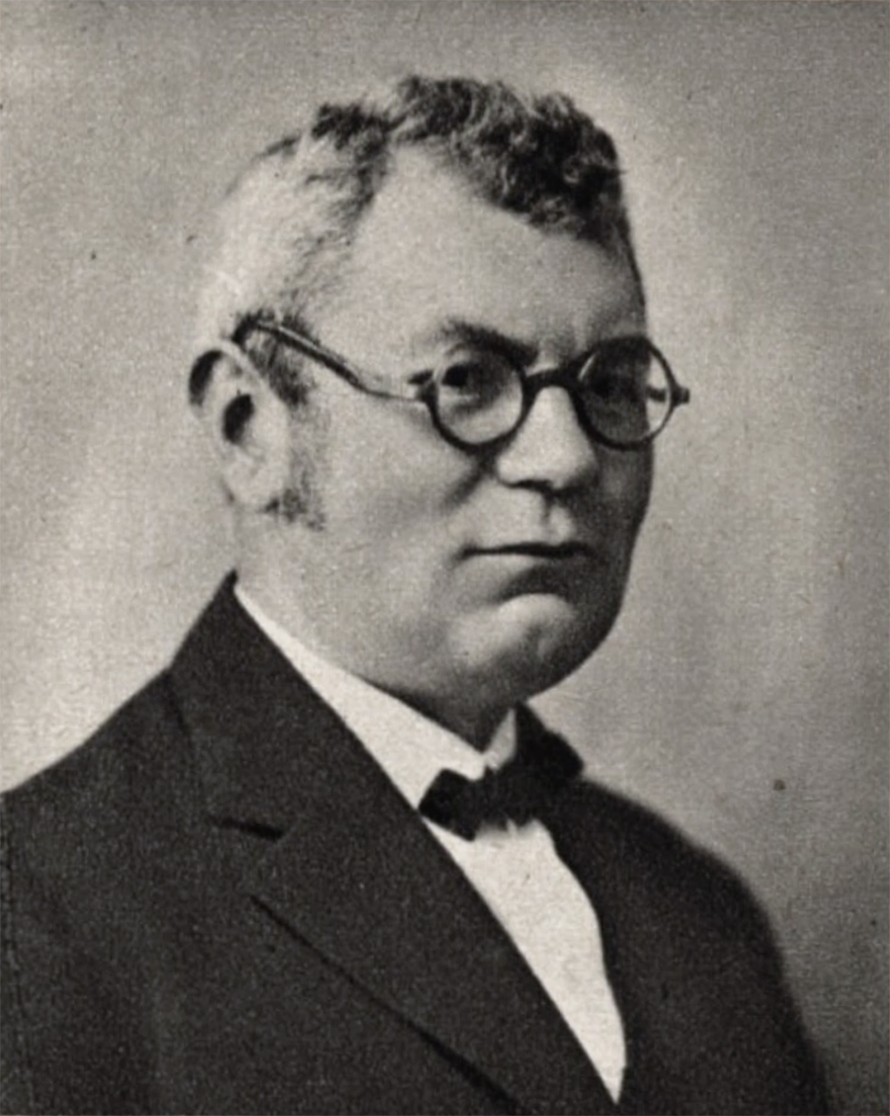
- Chaloupecký in 1928
- Born: 12 May 1882; Dětenice, Austria-Hungary
- Died: 22 November 1951 (aged 69); Dětenice, Czechoslovakia
- Occupations: Historian; professor; archivist

Academic background
- Education: Charles University

Academic work
- Discipline: History
- Institutions: Comenius University

Václav Chaloupecký (12 May 1882 Dětenice, Austria-Hungary – 22 November 1951 Dětenice, Czechoslovakia) was a Czech historian, a student of prominent Czech historian Josef Pekař and the main representative of historians in mid-war Slovakia.

== Life ==
He had studied at the Faculty of Arts, Charles University in Prague (1903–1907). Then he had worked as an archivist and librarian in Roudnice nad Labem (1907–1919). In 1919, he became a state inspector of Slovak archives and libraries (1919–1938). In the same time, he was also a docent (1922) and professor (1922–1938) of the Czechoslovak history at Comenius University. He held several academic positions e.g. dean (1929–1930) and vice-dean (1930–1931) of the Faculty of Arts, rector (1937–1938) and vice-rector (1938–1939) of the university. In 1939 he became an extraordinary professor at the Faculty of Arts in Prague where he had lectured until 1951 (except WWII). A member of the Scholastic Society of Šafárik.

== Work ==
- Jan IV. z Dražic, poslední biskup pražský (1908)
- František Palacký (1912)
- Dvě úvahy o národním probuzení na Slovensku (1920)
- K nejstarším dějinám Bratislavy (1922)
- Československé dějiny (1922)
- Staré Slovensko (Sp. fil. fak. Brat. 1923)
- Unsere Grenze gegen Ugarn (1923)
- Das historische recht der magyarischen Nation auf die territoriale Integrität (1923)
- Na úsvitě křesťanství (1924)
- Dvě studie k dějinám Podkarpatska (1925)
- Padělky staroslovenských zpěvů historických (1925)
- K dějinám valdenských v Čechách před hnutím husitským (1925)
- Česká hranice východní koncem XI. století (1926)
- Slovenské diaecese a tak řečená apoštolská práva uherská (1928)
- Martinská deklarace a její politické osudy (1928)
- O znaku Slovenska (1929)
- Nitra a počátky křesťanství na Slovensku (1930)
- Zápas o Slovensko – 1918 (1930)
- Der modus vivendi und die Slowakei (1931)
- Kniha Žilinská (1934)
- Svatý Vojtěch a slovanská liturgie (1934)
- Universita Petra Pázmánya a Slovensko (1935)
- Středověké listy ze Slovenska. Sbierka listov a listín písaných jazykom národným z rokov 1462-1490 (1937)
- Počátky státu českého a polského (1937)
- Svatováclavský sborník (1939)
- Arnošt z Pardubic: první arcibiskup pražský (1346-1364) (1941)
- Na úsvitě křesťanství (1942)
- Odkaz minulosti české (1946)
- Valaši na Slovensku (1947)
- Karlova universita v Praze 1348 až 1409 (1948)
- Středověké legendy pyearopské : jejich historický rozbor a texty (1953)
