= František Šmahel =

Czech historian (1934–2025)

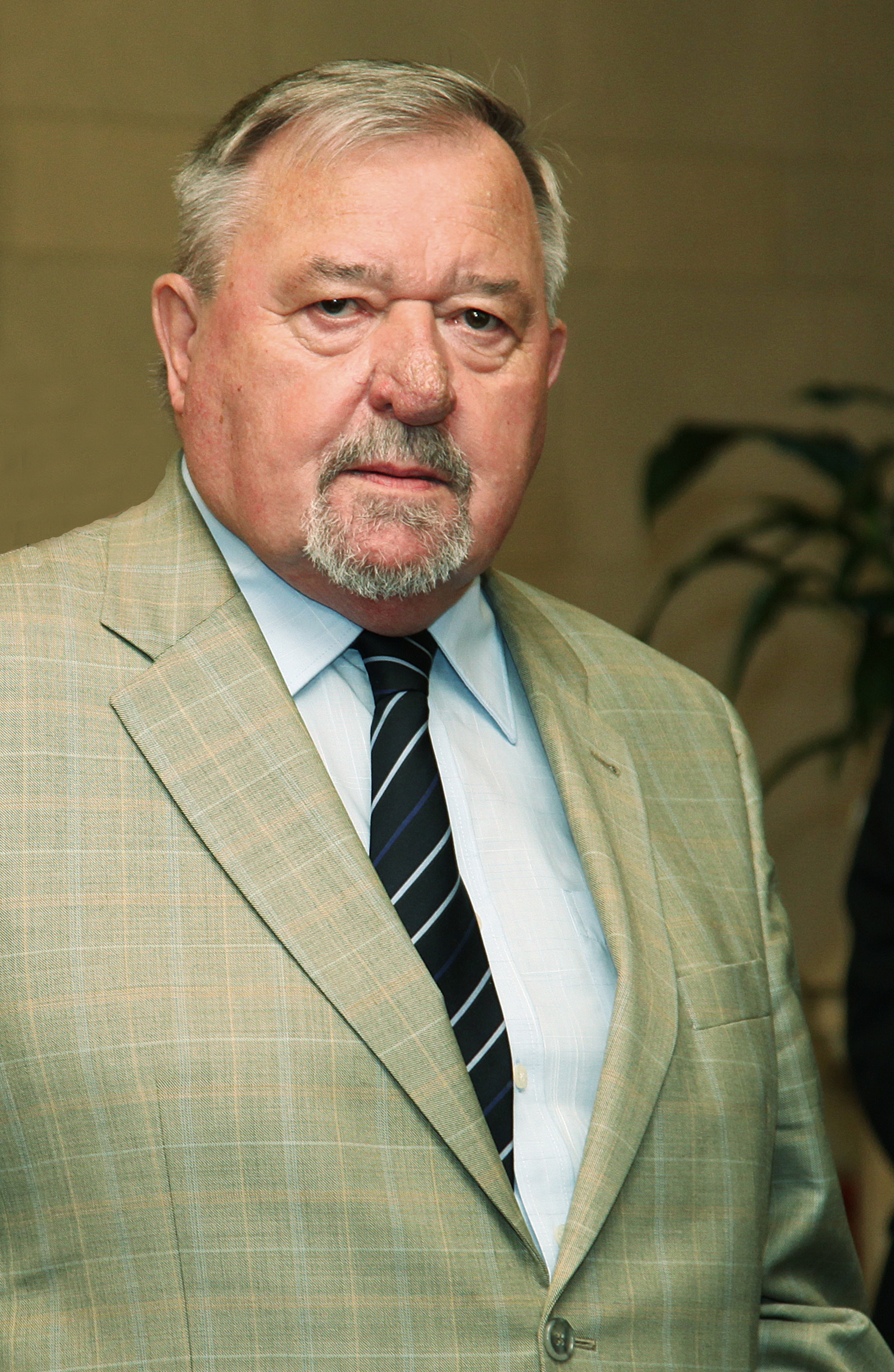
- Šmahel in 2011
- Born: 17 August 1934; Trhová Kamenice, Czechoslovakia
- Died: 5 January 2025 (aged 90); Písek, Czech Republic
- Occupation: Historian

František Šmahel (17 August 1934 – 5 January 2025) was a Czech historian of medieval political and intellectual history, known for his works about Hussitism, universities in the Middle Ages, humanism, and Monarch representation in the Middle Ages. He was a globally-recognized expert on the Bohemian Reformation and the medieval Prague University. His scholarly activities were diverse, covering historical figures (Jan Hus, Jerome of Prague), university texts, political history, research into rituals, and the publication of source editions.

After the Velvet Revolution in 1989, Šmahel was head of the Historical Institute of the Czech Academy of Sciences for eight years. Together with Petr Sommer, he initiated the foundation of the Centre for Medieval Studies in Prague and he became its first director in 1998–2004. In 1996, Šmahel was awarded the Hans Sigrist Prize. He was a member of many prestigious scholarly associations and was the recipient of a number of foreign and Czech honours, including the Česká hlava National Prize for Science (2013). He died in the Písek hospital on 5 January 2025, at the age of 90.
