= Petr Sommer =

Czech historian and archaeologist (1949–2023)

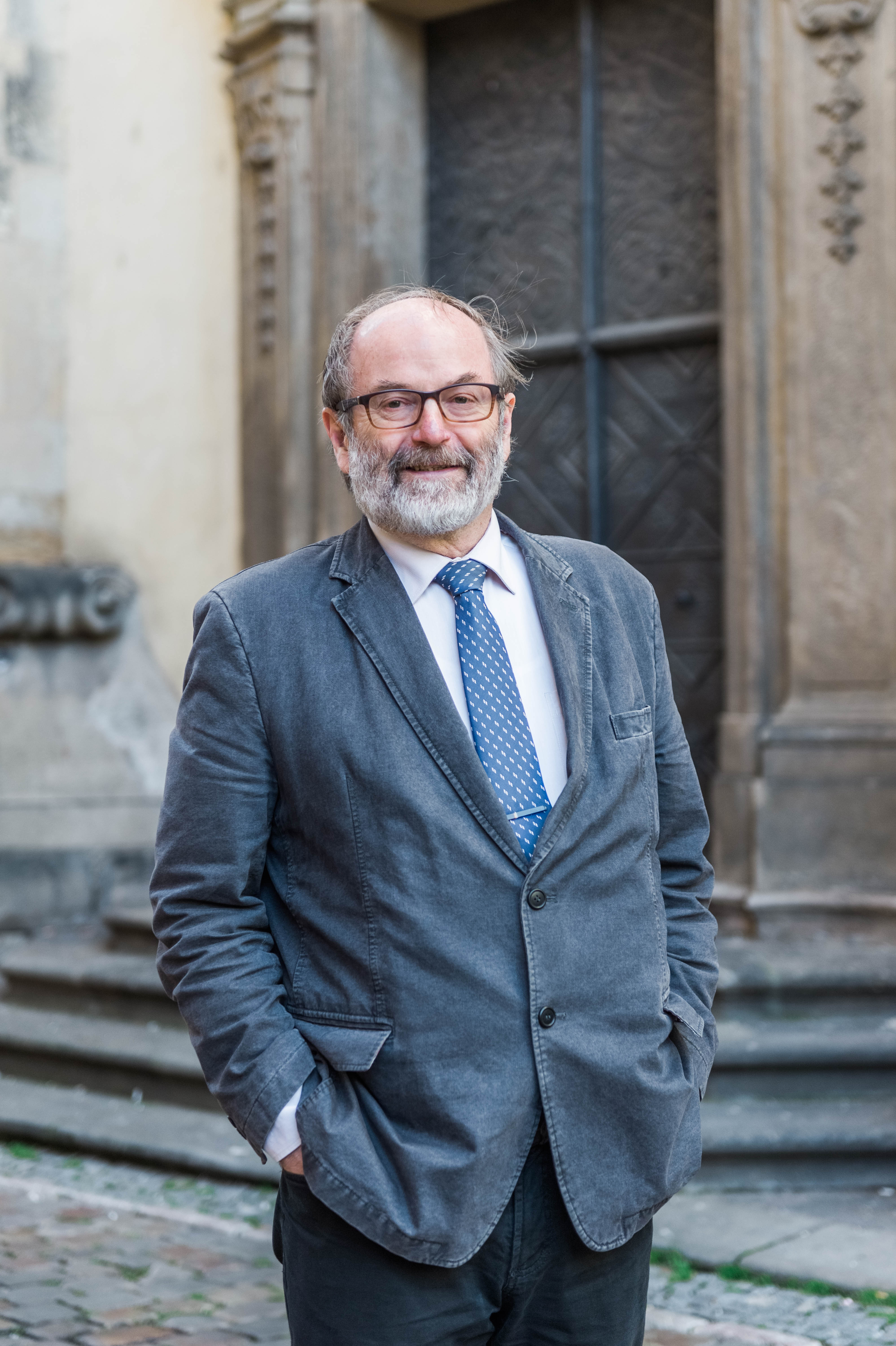
Sommer in front of St. Giles' Church in Prague, 2017

Petr Sommer (30 November 1949 – 12 August 2023) was a Czech historian and archaeologist. He focused on church archaeology, spiritual culture of the Middle Ages and its reflection in archaeological sources.

== Life and research ==
Petr Sommer was born in Rakovník. He studied history and prehistory at the Faculty of Arts of Charles University in Prague and later he worked as archaeologist for the Museum of East Bohemia in Pardubice and for the City of Prague Museum. In 1976, he started to work for the Institute of Archaeology of the Czechoslovak Academy of Sciences and he became its director (then already part of Czech Academy of Sciences) in 1993–1998. Then, he was the deputy director of the Centre for Medieval Studies in Prague (since its founding in 1998) and became the head in 2004.

In his research, he studied the Christianisation of Přemyslid Bohemia, monastic architecture, and life in monasteries in the early medieval period. He led research into the oldest Czech monasteries (Břevnov, Strahov, Ostrov near Davle, Beroun, Sázava). His work demonstrates his understanding of medieval studies as an interdisciplinary cooperation, in this case a cooperation between archaeologists, historians, and art historians in interpreting the arrival of Christianity to the Czech lands, and the related activities of the oldest monastic communities. He focused special attention on the medieval Sázava Abbey and the associated figure of St. Procopius.

Sommer was recognised for his work many times, latterly receiving the Česká hlava National Prize for Science (2017).

Petr Sommer died on 12 August 2023, at the age of 73.

== Selected bibliography ==
- Krypta kláštera v Břevnově – Krypta des Klosters in Břevnov – The Crypt of Břevnov Convent – Krypta monastyrja v Brževnove. Praha 1985 (with Dana Stehliková).
- Sázavský klášter. Praha : Unicornis, 1996. 62 s.
- Začátky křesťanství v Čechách : Kapitoly z dějiny raně středověké duchovní kultury. Praha : Garamond, 2001. 174 s. ISBN 80-86379-28-0.
- České země v raném středověku. Praha : Nakladatelství Lidové noviny, 2006. 243 s. ISBN 80-7106-855-1. (editor)
- Svatý Prokop : Z počátku českého státu a církve. Praha : Vyšehrad, 2007. 337 s. ISBN 978-80-7021-732-0.
- Přemyslovci : Budování českého státu. Praha : Nakladatelství Lidové noviny, 2009. 778 s. ISBN 978-80-7106-352-0. (with Dušan Třeštík and Josef Žemlička)
- Kostely na Sedlčansku. Sedlčany : Městské muzeum Sedlčany, 2011. 165 s. ISBN 978-80-903679-6-8.
