= Alexander Húščava =

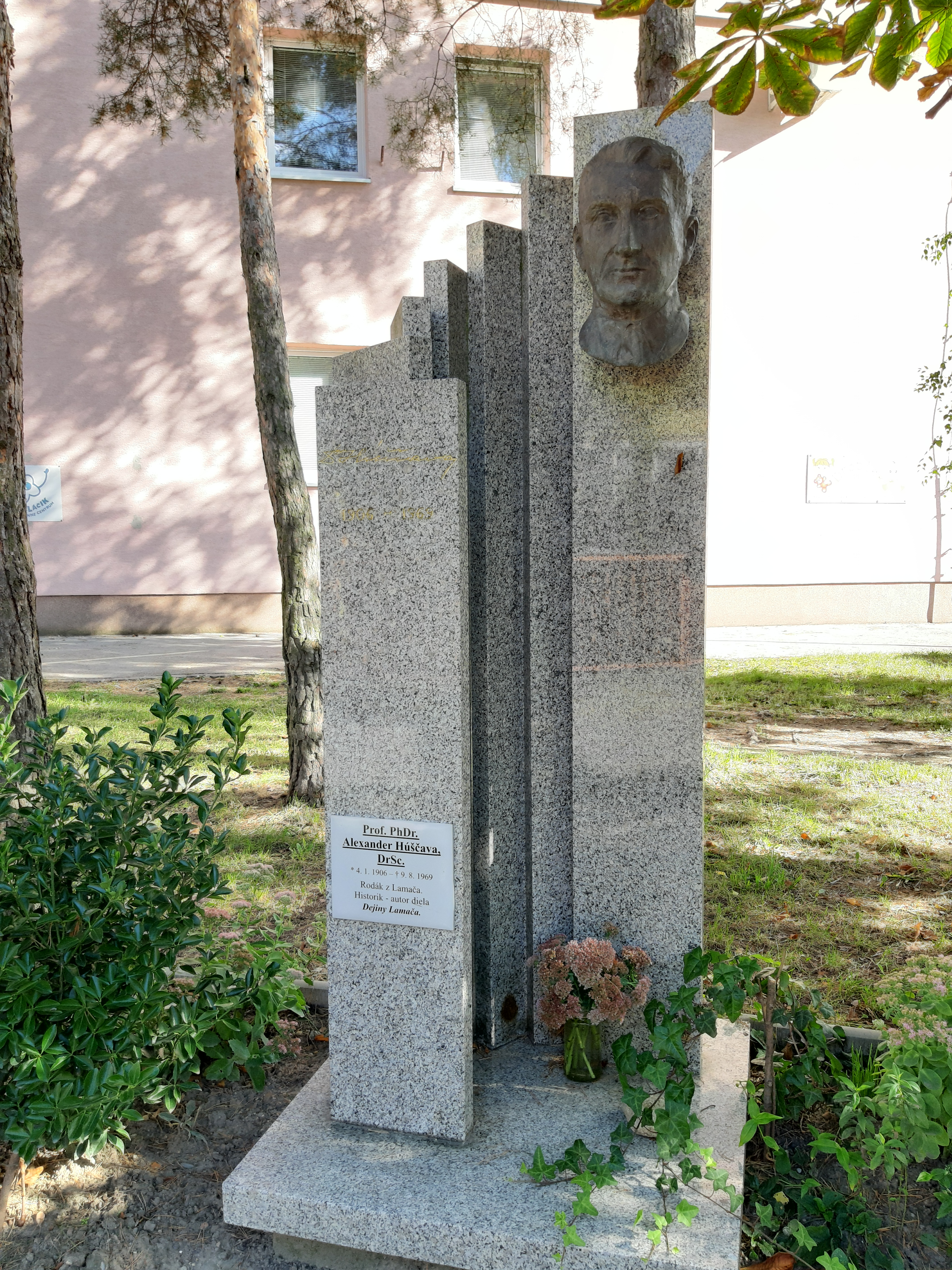
- Born: 4 January 1906; Lamač, Austria-Hungary (now Slovakia)
- Died: 9 August 1969 (aged 63); Lamač, Czechoslovakia (now Slovakia)
- Occupations: historian, archivist, university teacher

Alexander Húščava (4 January 1906, Lamač – 9 August 1969, Lamač) was a Slovak historian, pioneer in auxiliary sciences of history in Slovakia, founder of the department of archival studies at the Faculty of Arts of Comenius University at Bratislava.

== Life ==
He studied at the Faculty of Arts of Comenius University in Bratislava and habilitated in 1929. Then, he had worked at the Provincial Archive and pursued studies at the State Archivist School in Prague. In 1931, he was sent to study Slovak-related documents in Vatican Archives. In 1937, he became a docent in auxiliary sciences of history. In 1939, he became an extraordinary professor. From 1940, he was an ordinary professor.

He was the first scientist in Slovakia who systematically studied and taught auxiliary sciences of history. In the school year 1950/51, he succeeded in establishing a professional study of archival science at the Faculty of Arts of the Comenius University, led by him until his death.

== Selected works ==
- Kolonizácia Liptova do konca XIV. storočia. The Colonisation of Liptov to the 14th century (Bratislava 1930)
- Ján Literát a liptovské falzá. [Ján Literát and the False Documents From Liptov] (Bratislava 1936)
- Archív zemianskeho rodu z Okoličného. [The Archive of Lower Noblemen From Okoličné] (Bratislava 1943)
- Dejiny Lamača. [A History of Lamač] (Bratislava 1948, reed. 1998)
- Dejiny a vývoj nášho písma. [A History and Evolution of Our Writing] (Bratislava 1951)
- Poľnohospodárske miery na Slovensku. [Agricultural Measures in Slovakia] (Bratislava 1972)
