= C&C =

C&C may refer to:

- C&C Group (formerly Cantrell and Cochrane), a consumer goods group based in Ireland
- C&C Yachts, sailboat builder
- C+C Music Factory, an American dance-pop and hip hop group
- Cambridge & Coleridge Athletic Club, based in Cambridge, United Kingdom
- Castles & Crusades, a role-playing game
- Chris & Cosey, an industrial music project of Throbbing Gristle members
- City and Colour, acoustic project from musician Dallas Green
- Coheed and Cambria, a rock band from Nyack, New York, formed in 1995
- Chocolate and Cheese, album by Ween
- Codes and ciphers, see Cryptography
- Cookies and cream, an ice cream variety flavored with chocolate sandwich cookies
- Command and control, the exercise of authority by a commanding officer over military forces in the accomplishment of a mission
- Command and control (management), an approach to decision making in organizations
- Command and control (malware), a control mechanism for botnets
- Command & Conquer, a real-time strategy video game series
- Contraction and Convergence, an approach to limiting carbon dioxide emissions globally
- Cycle & Carriage, a Malaysian assembler and distributor of motor vehicles
