= Collegiate National Championship =

Collegiate National Championship, Collegiate National Championships or CNC may refer to any college championship event held at the national level.

Some Collegiate National Championships include;

- ACUI Collegiate National Championship, an Association of College Unions International tournament
- CPT Collegiate National Championship, Championship event for the United States College Pickleball Tour
  - DUPR Collegiate National Championship, previous name of the CPT Collegiate National Championship
- IRA National Championship Regatta, the United States collegiate national championship of men's rowing
- Philippine Collegiate Champions League
- USA Rugby Sevens Collegiate National Championships
