= Vladimír Skalička =

- Born: 19 August 1909; Prague, Austria-Hungary
- Died: 17 January 1991 (aged 81); Prague, Czechoslovakia
- Education: Charles University in Prague
- Known for: Morphological typology
- Spouse: Alena Skaličková
- Scientific career
- Fields: Linguistics
- Workplaces: Charles University in Prague

Vladimír Skalička (19 August 1909 – 17 January 1991) was a Czechoslovak professor, linguist, translator, and polyglot. A member of the influential Prague School of linguists and literary critics and a corresponding member of the Czechoslovak Academy of Sciences, he is credited with further developing morphological typology.

== Life and work ==
Skalička was born on 19 August 1909 in Prague, then part of Austria-Hungary. His grandfather was Czech painter Josef Mánes. He became associated with the Prague School while studying at Charles University in Prague, at which he habilitated in 1935, writing on Finno-Ugric linguistics. He remained at the university, and in 1946 was appointed professor there, founding the department of linguistics and phonetics. He continued to write until late into his life in a number of languages, collaborating with a number of other linguists including his wife, Alena Skaličková.

Skalička was an active communist and influenced some of his students in politics. In 1951–1952 he was the dean of the Faculty of Arts of Charles University. In 1960 he was awarded the degree of Doctor of Sciences. Two years later he became a correspondent member of the Czechoslovak Academy of Sciences.

After 1968 during the so called era of "normalization" he was expelled from the Communist Party and sidelined within academia, however he continued to publish his works.

His work included translation and comparative studies of languages, and was reported to have a basic understanding of approximately 1200 languages and dialects.

He developed morphological typology into five categories, classifying languages into isolating, agglutinating, inflectional, introflectional, and polysynthetic.
