= Růžena Vacková =

Czech art historian, art theoretician, theatre critic and pedagogue (1901–1982)

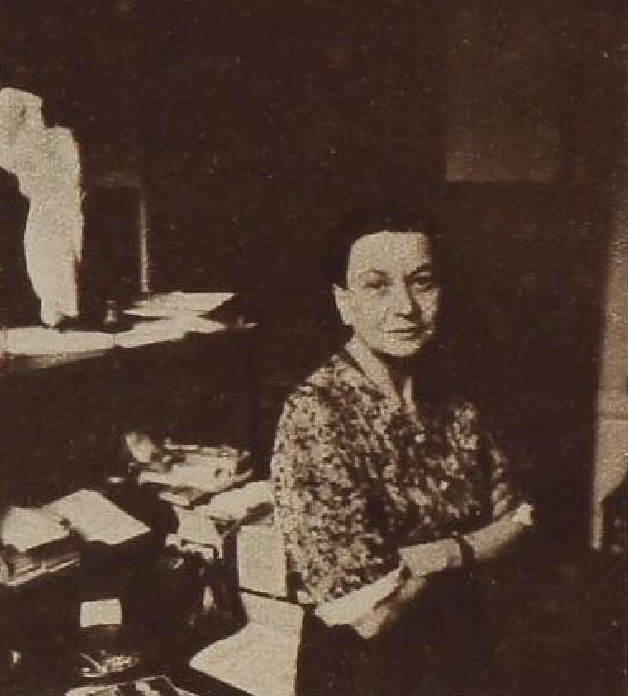
Vacková in 1947

Růžena Vacková (23 April 1901 Velké Meziříčí – 14 December 1982 Prague) was a Czech art historian, art theoretician, theatre critic and pedagogue. She also engaged in archaeology.

== Life ==
Her father was a doctor and a co-founder of the Czech Red Cross. She studied a classic grammar school in Vyškov and graduated from Gymnázium třída Kapitána Jaroše in Brno in 1920. Later she attended lectures of classical archaeology (professor Hynek Vysoký), history of art and esthetic (prof. Vojtěch Birnbaum) and history of theatre at the Faculty of Arts of Charles University in Prague. After getting her degree she gave lectures as a private associate professor of classical archaeology. She obtained her professor degree in 1946.

Between 1934 and 1942, she published articles on theatre criticism in Národní střed.

Between 1943 and 1945, she was imprisoned by the Czech Nazi puppet government. At that time, she also converted to Catholicism and after World War II she participated in the activities of the Czech catholic circles, inspired by the Croatian Jesuit Tomislav Kolakovic. She co-worked with active Czech Catholics Oto Mádr, Josef Zvěřina and others. In February 1948, she attended, as the only one of the Charles University pedagogues, the student march to Prague Castle. As this was to support the president Edvard Beneš, it brought her the negative attention of the Czech communists. At the first after-February meeting of the professors of the Faculty of Arts she was again the only one who protested against expulsion of the students who had participated in the march from school. She proclaimed:

I agree with the Dean as to the events of the past days. However, I missed the statement that each community is based on its moral code. I judge the moral code by its criteria. I wonder about the criteria that led to the expulsion of the professors and even students. If I witnessed and participated in the manifestations, I proclaim, that these were true manifestations and not demonstrations, as the slogans I heard were of neither political nor of economic character. On the contrary, they were of moral character. If the participation in the march was the reason for the expulsion of the students, then I wish to share their fate.

After the University banned her from lecturing at the beginning of the 1950s, she continued her activities. She was arrested in 1951 and in 1952 she was sentenced to 22 years of jail for espionage and high treason during the process of Ota Mádr and his associates. The State Court in Brno was chaired by Jaroslav Novák, the state prosecution was led by JUDr. Karel Čížek. The process was public and there were about 1,500 people in the audience.

Růžena Vacková spent in jail almost 16 years (including the custody). In prison she organised lectures for her fellow prisoners. Immediately after she was released she renewed her activities and contacts with Zvěřina and Mádr.

She was rehabilitated in 1969; two years later, her rehabilitiation was cancelled. Later she signed Charter 77. During the Normalization period, she organised home seminars for mainly young people and gave lectures on spirituality and art history. She died in 1982.

== Work ==
- Sokrates, vychovatel národa, 1939
- Výtvarný projev dramatický, 1948
- Věda o slohu, 1993
- Ticho s ozvěnami (lectures from the prison 1952-1967), 2011
- Vězeňské přednášky (lectures from the prison, archive of the Charles University,1999)
