= Dětenice =

- Municipality
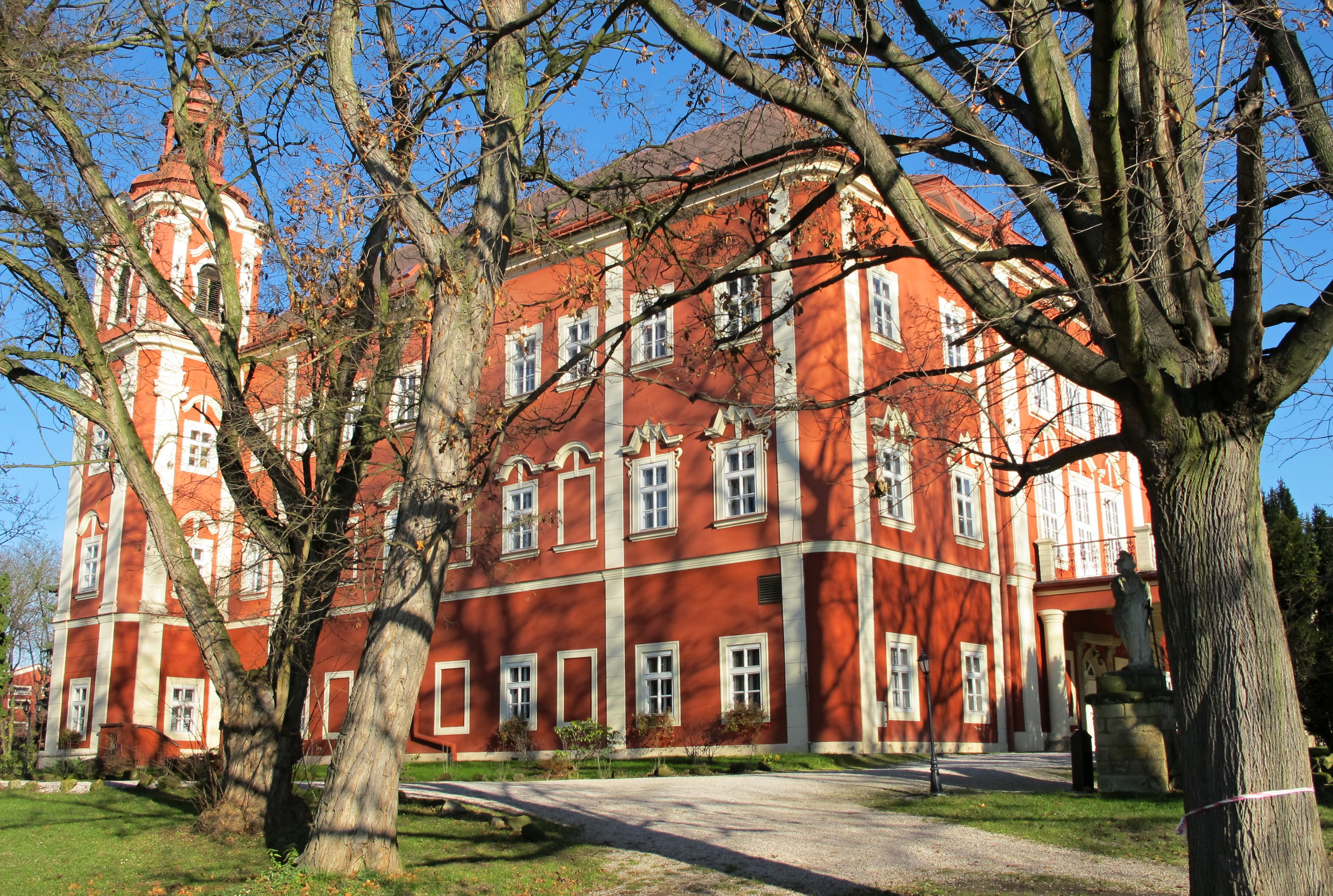
- Dětenice Castle

- Location in the Czech Republic
- Coordinates: 50°22′5″N 15°10′14″E
- Country: Czech Republic
- Region: Hradec Králové
- District: Jičín
- First mentioned: 1052

Area
  - Total: 17.69 km^{2} (6.83 sq mi)
- Elevation: 224 m (735 ft)

Population (2026-01-01)
  - Total: 759
  - Density: 42.9/km^{2} (111/sq mi)
- Time zone: UTC+1 (CET)
  - Summer (DST): UTC+2 (CEST)
- Postal codes: 507 23, 507 24
- Website: www.obecdetenice.cz

Dětenice is a municipality and village in Jičín District in the Hradec Králové Region of the Czech Republic. It has about 800 inhabitants.

== Administrative division ==
Dětenice consists of three municipal parts (in brackets population according to the 2021 census):

- Dětenice (353)
- Brodek (124)
- Osenice (214)

== Etymology ==
The initial name of the village was Dětynice. The name was derived from the personal name Dětyně, meaning "the village of Dětyně's people".

== Geography ==
Dětenice is located about 15 kilometres (9 mi) southwest of Jičín and 56 km (35 mi) northeast of Prague. It lies mostly in the Central Elbe Table. The northernmost part of the municipal territory belongs to the Jičín Uplands and includes the highest point of Dětenice at 346 m (1,135 ft) above sea level.

== History ==
The first written mention of Dětenice is from 1052, when Duke Bretislav I donated the village to the collegiate church in Stará Boleslav. Then the village was divided into two parts; one was acquired by the Prague bishopric and one was owned by various noblemen. Beneš Markvartic (1269–1318) founded here a fortress.

After the Hussite Wars, the village was united. In 1503, the Dětenice estate was bought by the Lords of Křinec. Their properties were confiscated after the Battle of White Mountain in 1620 and Dětenice was then acquired by Albrecht von Wallenstein. The Waldstein family owned Dětenice until the mid-18th century.

== Demographics ==
Historical population

| Year | Pop. | ±% |
|---|---|---|
| 1869 | 1,354 | — |
| 1880 | 1,401 | +3.5% |
| 1890 | 1,489 | +6.3% |
| 1900 | 1,486 | −0.2% |
| 1910 | 1,491 | +0.3% |

| Year | Pop. | ±% |
|---|---|---|
| 1921 | 1,427 | −4.3% |
| 1930 | 1,346 | −5.7% |
| 1950 | 1,119 | −16.9% |
| 1961 | 1,062 | −5.1% |
| 1970 | 949 | −10.6% |

| Year | Pop. | ±% |
|---|---|---|
| 1980 | 868 | −8.5% |
| 1991 | 799 | −7.9% |
| 2001 | 733 | −8.3% |
| 2011 | 695 | −5.2% |
| 2021 | 691 | −0.6% |

Source: Censuses

== Transport ==
There are no major roads passing through the municipality. The railway that runs through Dětenice is unused.

== Sights ==
The most important monument is the Dětenice Castle. It was originally a medieval fortress, rebuilt in the Renaissance style at the end of the 16th century. In 1762–1765, the fortress was rebuilt into the late Baroque castle. Today the castle is privately owned and is open to the public.

The Church of the Nativity of the Virgin Mary is located in Osenice. It was built in the Neo-Renaissance and Neo-Baroque style in 1863–1865.

== Notable people ==
- Miloš Hájek (1921–2016), historian, politician and resistance fighter
