= St. Giles' Church (Prague) =

- Kostel svatého Jiljí
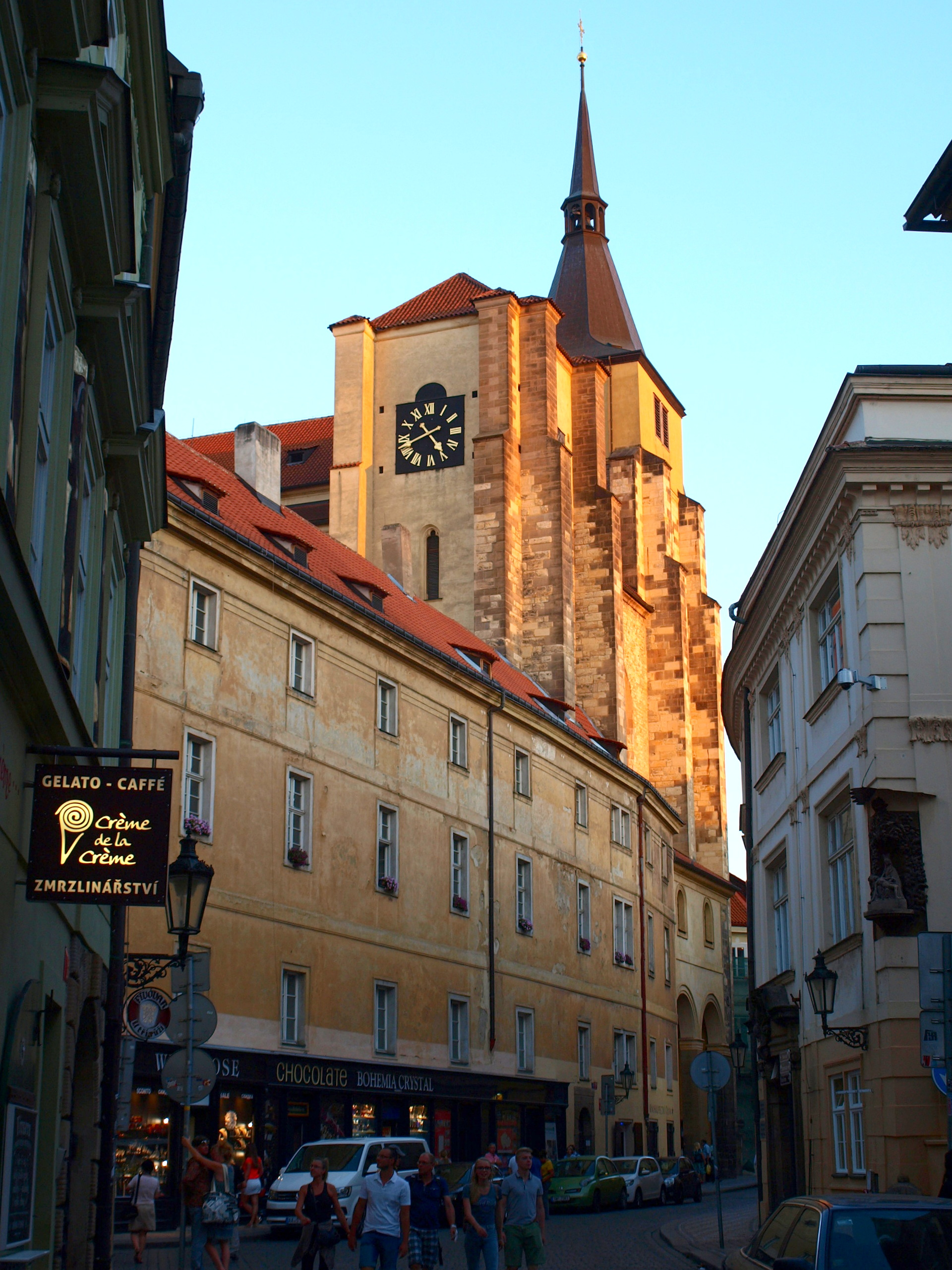
- The church's exterior, 2015
- St. Giles' Church
- 50.0844°N 14.4182°E
- Location: Prague
- Country: Czech Republic

The Church of Saint Giles (Czech: Kostel svatého Jiljí) is a church in Prague, Czech Republic. This monumental three-aisled church was built on the foundations of a Romanesque church. Subsequently, numerous reconstructions took place during the 12th to 14th century. The Church of St. Giles in Prague was consecrated on 4 May 1371. In 1625, the church was donated to the Dominican order, which has served here and in the adjacent monastery ever since. The church was remodeled in Baroque style.
