= Loukov (Mladá Boleslav District) =

- Municipality
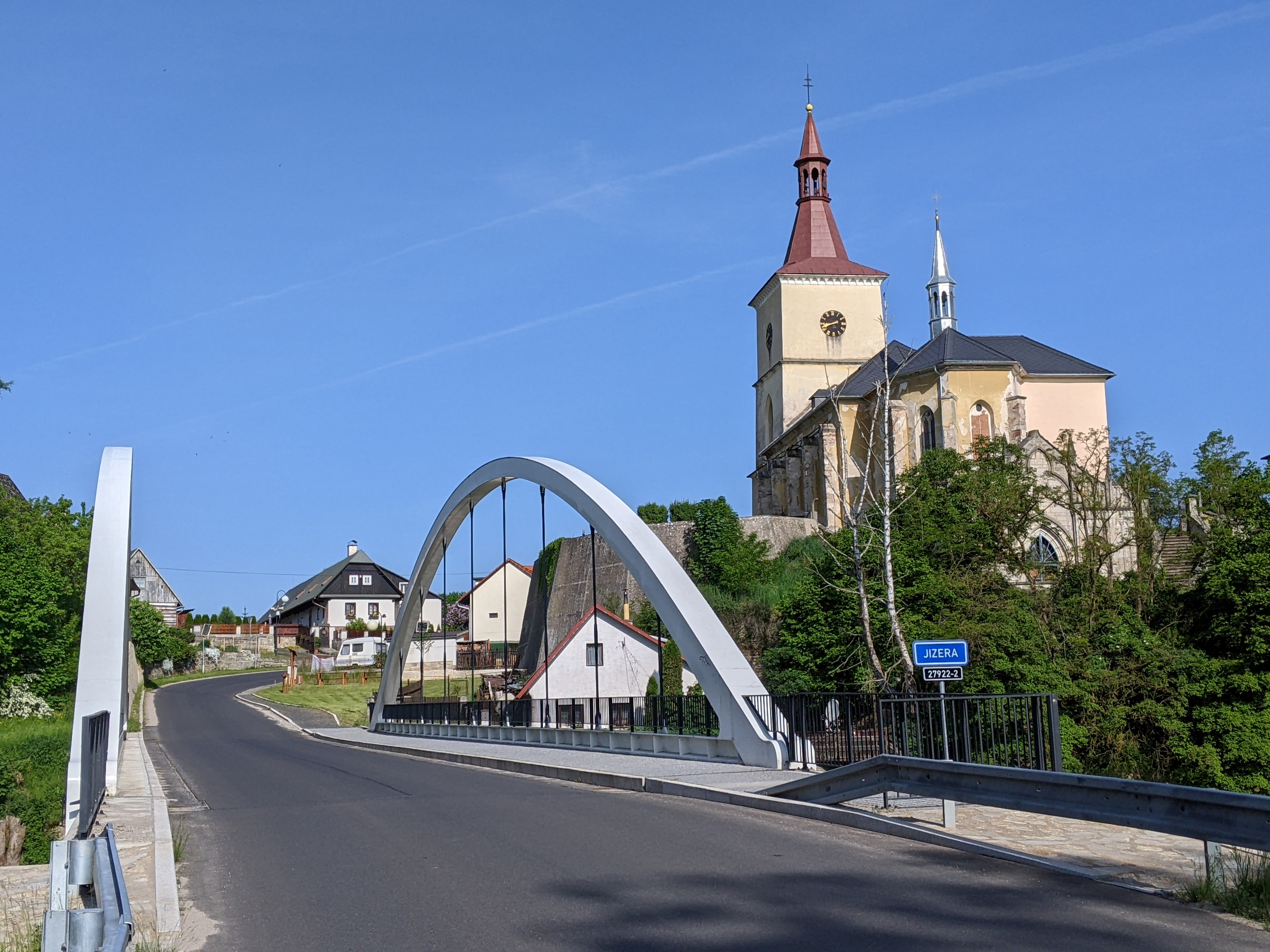
- View towards the Church of the Holy Trinity

- Flag Coat of arms

- Location in the Czech Republic
- Coordinates: 50°33′41″N 15°2′9″E
- Country: Czech Republic
- Region: Central Bohemian
- District: Mladá Boleslav
- First mentioned: 1352

Area
  - Total: 5.89 km^{2} (2.27 sq mi)
- Elevation: 235 m (771 ft)

Population (2026-01-01)
  - Total: 215
  - Density: 36.5/km^{2} (94.5/sq mi)
- Time zone: UTC+1 (CET)
  - Summer (DST): UTC+2 (CEST)
- Postal code: 294 11
- Website: www.loukov.e-obec.cz

Loukov is a municipality and village in Mladá Boleslav District in the Central Bohemian Region of the Czech Republic. It has about 200 inhabitants. The village is well preserved and is protected as a village monument zone.

== Etymology ==
The name is derived from the personal name Louka (in old Czech written as Lúka), meaning "Louka's/Lúka's (court)".

== Geography ==
Loukov is located about 17 kilometres (11 mi) northeast of Mladá Boleslav and 22 km (14 mi) south of Liberec. It lies in the Jičín Uplands. The highest point is the hill Slavín at 292 m (958 ft) above sea level. The municipality is situated on the right bank of the Jizera River.

== History ==
Loukov was probably founded around 1200 and there is an indirect reference that the village existed in 1225. The first trustworthy written mention of Loukov is from 1352, when it was owned by the Cistercian monastery in Klášter Hradiště nad Jizerou. During the Hussite Wars in the first half of the 15th century, the monastery was destroyed and its properties were acquired by the royal chamber. In 1436, Loukov was pledged to nobleman Bohuš of Kováň and Frydštejn. After his death, the village was acquired by the Waldstein family, who owned it until 1528. The next owners were the Vartenberk family, who annexed Loukov to the Svijany estate in 1556.

== Demographics ==
Historical population

| Year | Pop. | ±% |
|---|---|---|
| 1869 | 373 | — |
| 1880 | 539 | +44.5% |
| 1890 | 516 | −4.3% |
| 1900 | 485 | −6.0% |
| 1910 | 486 | +0.2% |

| Year | Pop. | ±% |
|---|---|---|
| 1921 | 440 | −9.5% |
| 1930 | 444 | +0.9% |
| 1950 | 442 | −0.5% |
| 1961 | 416 | −5.9% |
| 1970 | 365 | −12.3% |

| Year | Pop. | ±% |
|---|---|---|
| 1980 | 281 | −23.0% |
| 1991 | 191 | −32.0% |
| 2001 | 179 | −6.3% |
| 2011 | 178 | −0.6% |
| 2021 | 210 | +18.0% |

Source: Censuses

== Transport ==
The D10 motorway (part of the European route E65) from Prague to Turnov runs through the eastern part of the municipality.

Loukov is located on the railway line Prague–Turnov via Mladá Boleslav.

== Sights ==
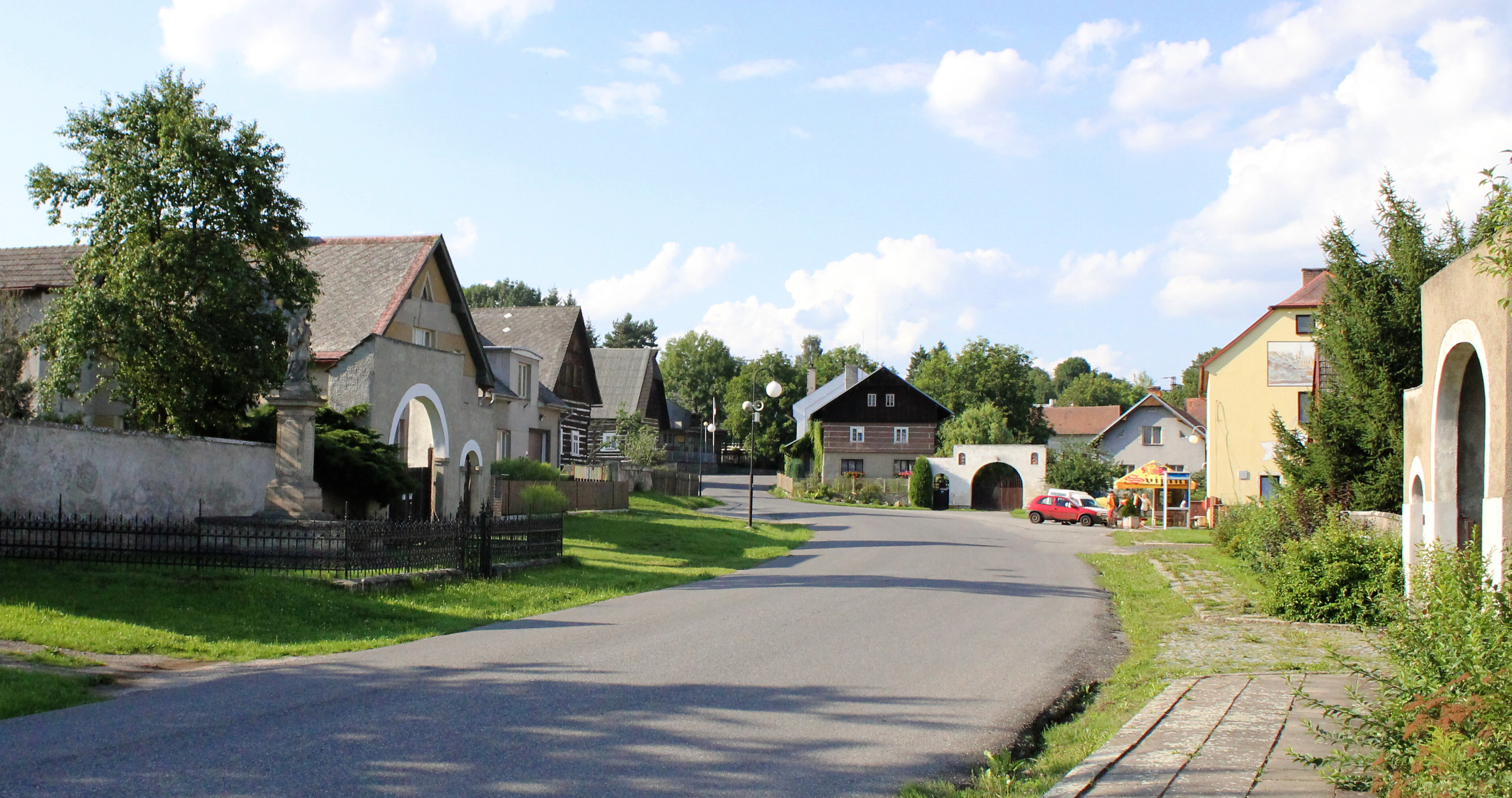
Centre of Loukov

The almost entire area of the village is protected as a village monument zone. There are many preserved houses in vernacular architecture, although some have been defaced by inappropriate modifications. Most of these houses, often half-timbered, date from the second half of the 18th century and the first half of the 19th century.

The main landmark of Loukov is the Church of the Holy Trinity. It has a medieval core from the 14th–16th centuries. After the church was damaged by a fire in 1819, it was rebuilt to its present neo-Gothic form.
