= Jaroslav Goll =

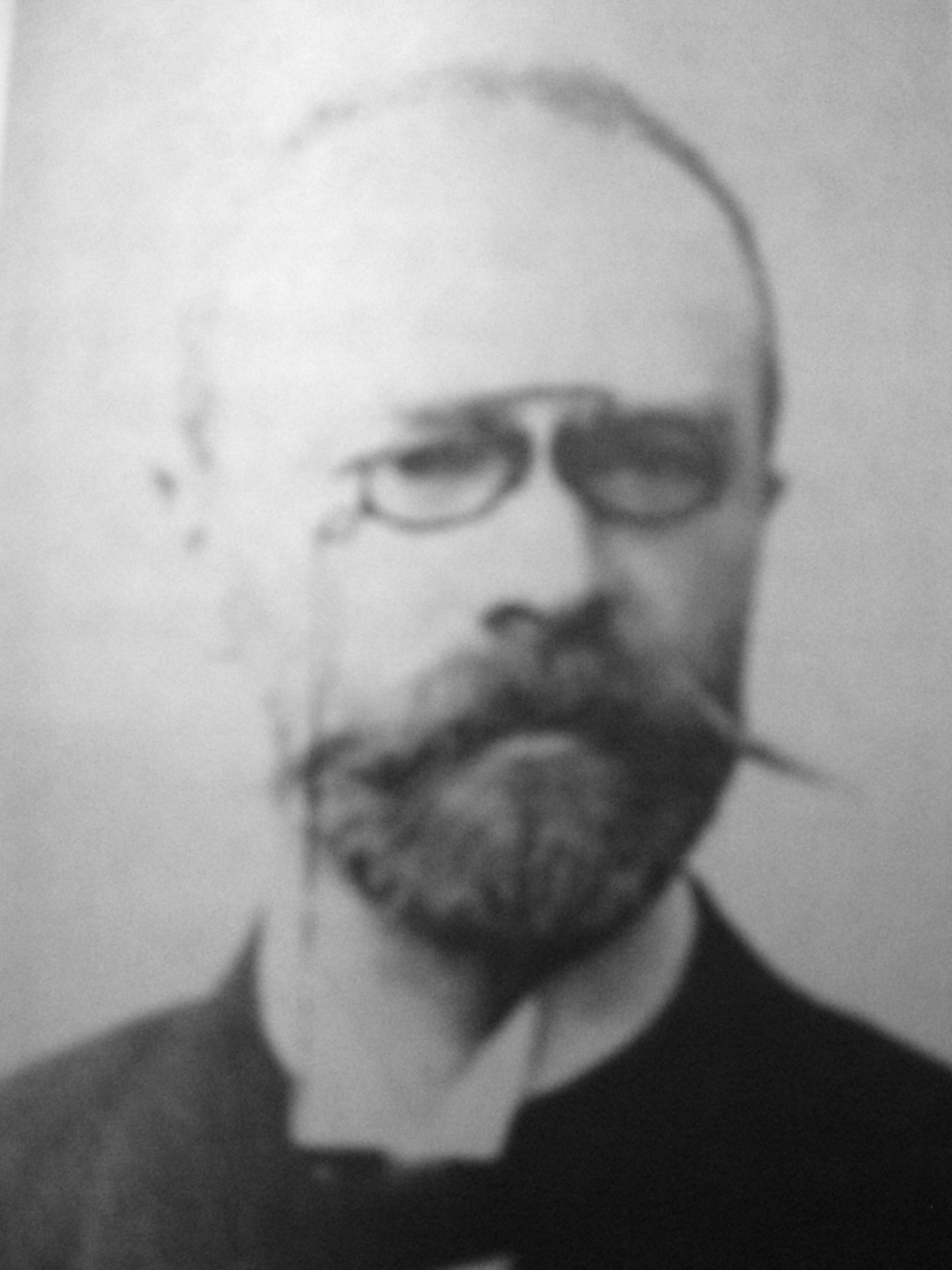
Jaroslav Goll

Jaroslav Goll (14 July 1846 – 8 July 1929) was a Czech historian, medievalist, educator, writer and translator. He was a representative of the historical positivism. He studied history at the Charles University in Prague under Czech Václav Vladivoj Tomek and German Konstantin Höfler. In 1871 he worked at the University of Göttingen where he was influenced by positivist Georg Waitz. Then he studied in Berlin, The Hague and London. In 1875, he began teaching at the University of Prague, where he worked until his retirement in the year 1910. Then he very actively involved in politics. In 1895 he founded the Czech Historical Review (Český časopis historický), the most important historical journal in the Czech lands, which still exists today. In 1907 he was elected rector of the university. His main professional interest was English medieval history. He also devoted a study personalities of Czech history (Komenský, Palacký, Chelčický). His pupils are called Goll's school. He gave private lessons later Emperor Charles I during his studies in Prague. He was the grandfather of the Czech actress Nataša Gollová.
