= Vladimír Šmilauer =

Czech linguist and Slovakist (1895–1983)

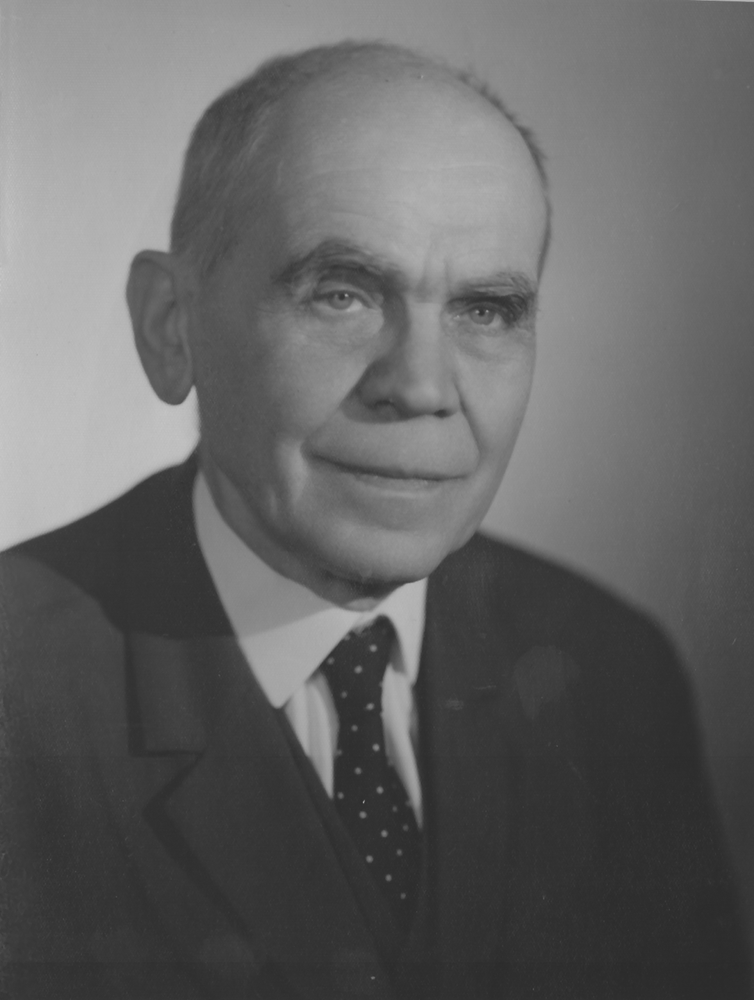
- Vladimír Šmilauer
- Born: 5 December 1895; Plzeň, Austria-Hungary (now Czech Republic)
- Died: 13 October 1983 (aged 87); Prague, Czechoslovakia (now Czech Republic)
- Occupations: linguist, Bohemist and Slovakist

Vladimír Šmilauer (5 December 1895, Plzeň – 13 October 1983, Prague) was a Czech linguist, Bohemist and Slovakist.

== Biography ==
Vladimír Šmilauer was born on 5 December 1895. He studied Czech and German at the Faculty of Arts of the Charles University in Prague. From 1921 to 1938, he worked as a high school professor. In 1938, he was appointed professor at Charles University. During the German occupation, he left his job at Charles University and worked at the Slavonic Institute in Prague. After World War II, he returned to the university.

His main research interests were the theory of word formation, syntax, and Czech and Slovak toponymy.

== Works ==
- Vodopis starého Slovenska, Praha-Bratislava 1932
- Osídlení a národnost Spiše, Bratislava 1935
- Co nového v Pravidlech českého pravopisu 1941?, Praha 1943
- Novočeská skladba, Praha 1947 (2. vyd. 1966)
- Osídlení Čech ve světle místních jmen, Praha 1960
- Úvod do toponomastiky, Praha 1963 (2. vyd. 1966)
- Příručka slovanské toponomastiky I–II, Praha 1963–1964
- Příručka slovanské toponomastiky – Handbuch des slawischen Toponomastik, Praha 1970
- Novočeské tvoření slov, Praha 1971
- Nauka o českém jazyku, Praha 1972
