= Josef Pekař =

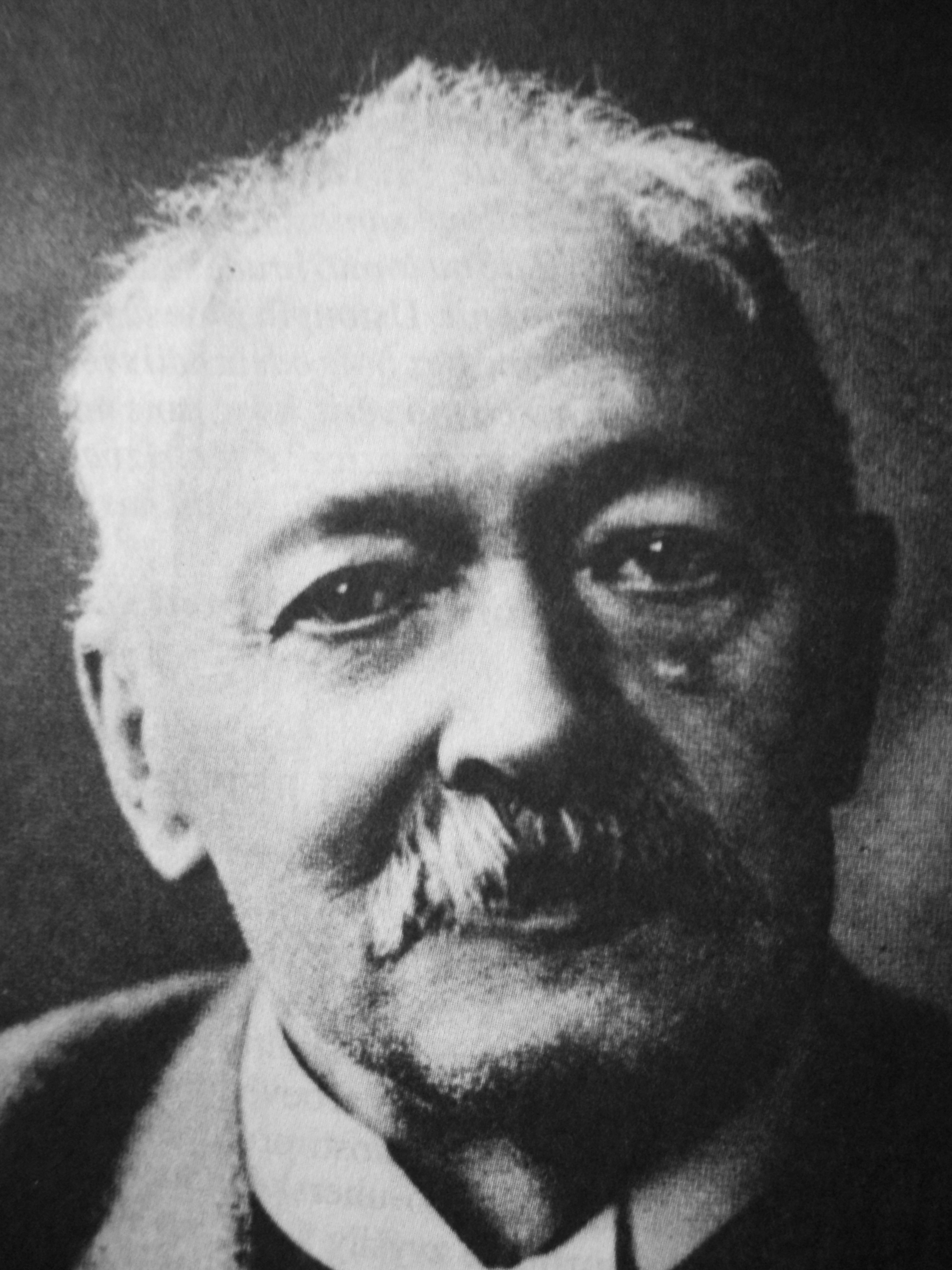
- Josef Pekař c. 1920s
- Born: 1870; Turnov
- Died: 1937 (aged 66–67); Prague
- Occupations: Historian; professor; rector

Josef Pekař (April 12, 1870 Malý Rohozec at Turnov – January 23, 1937 Prague) was a prominent Czech historian of the turn of 19th and 20th century, professor and rector of Charles University in Prague.

== Life and work ==
After graduating at high school in Mladá Boleslav, which now bears his name, Pekař studied history in Prague. He started the career of historian already during studies, when his article, published in 1890 in Tomáš Garrigue Masaryk's magazine Athenaeum, proved by historical findings, that so called "Manuscript of Králův Dvůr" (Rukopis královédvorský), allegedly from the 13th century, whose authenticity has long led disputes in the Czech society, is a counterfeit. Pekař graduated in 1893 by the work Nominantions of the King Ottokar II for the German throne about personal struggle of Přemysl Ottokar II for the imperial throne in the years 1272–1273.

After studies, Pekař spent one year at universities in Erlangen and Berlin, then, he taught for shorter time at the secondary school in Mladá Boleslav and Prague. In 1895, he became the founder of Czech historical magazine, which lead after for thirty years. In 1897, he wrote The History of the Wallenstein conspiracy (1630–1634) and the same year, he declined sharply an anti-Czech article of German historian Theodor Mommsen, proving the importance of Czech culture for Europe; his answer was published again several times and translated into many languages. From that time, Pekař has become well recognized authority among central European historians. In 1901, Pekař was appointed professor of Charles university in Prague.

In 1903, in the work The Oldest Czech Chronicle, Pekař proved, that so called Kristián's legend (Latin writings about the origins of Christianity in the Czech lands and the first Czech saints, Saint Ludmila and Saint Wenceslas), which origin was placed in the 13th century by Josef Dobrovský comes really already from the 10th century (written probably before 994).

In the years 1909 and 1911, he published The Book about Kost (Kniha o Kosti), a precise description of the life of aristocracy during 30 years war and about the situation of tributaries in 17th and 18th century. His emphasis of the details of common life and economic circumstances was completely new and outrun that time. The following work was Czech cadasters 1654–1789 from 1915, in which Pekař demonstrated gradual of centralization in Austrian empire.

In 1912, Pekař wrote and published a brochure Masaryk's Czech philosophy. In this book, he defended himself and the pozitivistic school of Jaroslav Goll against the attacks of pro-Masaryk Czech writer, historian and politician Jan Herben and criticised Masaryk's historiographic methods, rejecting above all the claim, that the meaning of Czech history consisted of the religious idea of humanity. Thus, the long-term dispute among historians over this topic began.

After the end of World War I and the formation of Czechoslovakia, Pekař wrote "Czechoslovak history" (published 1921), a textbook, which was used in high schools for many years. He also wrote about the causes of the conflict in the book "World War", published in the same year. In response to post-war anti-Catholic tendencies in the society, he started to apologize the Czech baroque period and the role of aristocracy at that time, which was usually considered a dark period of the Czech nation and the germanization of the Czechs. These themes were discussed in his works Three chapters from the fight for Saint John of Nepomuk (Tři kapitoly o sv. Janu Nepomuckém) and White Mountain (Bílá Hora) from 1921, and Fallacies and dangers of the holding reform (Omyly a nebezpečí pozemkové reformy) published in 1923.

In his four-volume work Žižka and his times (1928–1934), Pekař rated Hussite's chieftain John Žižka from Trocnov rather as a warrior and a religious fanatic, contesting transnational significance of hussitism and presented it as a movement of genuinely medieval character with tragic consequences in Czech history. The book provoked sharp reactions, because that movement was usually hailed as the struggle for national and religious freedom. Pekař answered them with a series of articles, which were later published together as his best known book About the meaning of the Czech history.

In 1931–1932, he was elected Rector of Charles University. In inaugural speech, he emphasized his national-conservative views and the need the periodization of Czech history should be based on general historical epochs, similarly to art history.

His contribution to the scientific discipline of history has been awarded by the membership in the Czech Academy of Sciences and Arts. He was a member of the Czech Royal society of Sciences.

== The conception of historiography ==
The basic principle of Pekař's conception was the necessity to understand historical epoch from itself, thus, to cognize and feel its spirit. According to him, historiography should have scientific foundations, but the contribution of historian should consist of understanding and faithful description of ancient times. "Historiography is not an exact science, a sober autopsy of a matter, but the science exploring life of individual people in its complexity". That's why a historian cannot coolly stay to be a disinterested observer - he has to take his own position to the past. This Pekař's conception is no longer to be considered "positivism", exceeding it by going beyond historical facts, which were obtained from historical sources. Therefore, historical events are interpreted consistently in the contemporary context. He - as a conscientious historian - emphasized the heterogeneity of ideas of different eras ("The events must always be viewed through the eyes of then people")

Pekař was a conservative patriot, rejecting almost mythological deification of some historical events, which in his opinion had rather negative consequencies (Hussite wars, etc.). He was convinced about substantial negative impact of religious conflicts on Czech history and many times urged Czech patriotism to get rid of them. He was a strong opponent of historical philosophy of František Palacký and T.G.Masaryk. As a historian, he reproached Masaryk for putting too much emphasis on the religious reformist significance of Czech history, while he himself stressed the aspect of nationality. In the beginning, he considered national element as fundamental and motive, later, he spoke about complex concept of Czech history, putting it inside wider European context, being aware of complicacy and relativity of historical events. He respected the rights of the German population living within Czech territory, but he strongly opposed an historical interpretation of Czech-German relations from a "Greater German" perspective. He also appreciated the role of foreign, western European factors in Czech history. In his view, the history of a nation cannot emerge from a single foundation, as Masaryk claimed, but is formed out of the countless layers produced by cultural, economic and political changes.

== Citation ==
"Josef Pekař and his intense personality reminds us that we can never uncover history completely, the totality that resides in details, the power of history that shapes the present."

== Works ==
- The Oldest Czech Chronicle, Prague, 1903
- The Book about Kost I.–II., Prague 1909–1911
- Masaryk's Czech philosophy, 1912
- Czech cadastres 1654–1789, Prague 1915, 1932
- The Czechoslovak History, Prague 1921, 1991
- White Mountain, Prague 1921
- World War, Prague, 1921
- Three chapters from the fight for Saint John of Nepomuk, Prague 1921
- Discoveries of Bretholz, 1922
- Fallacies and dangers of the land-holding reform, 1923
- Masaryk's Czech philosophy reworked version, Historic club, Prague 1927
- About the sense of the Czech history, Prague 1929
- Saint Wenceslas,1929
- Žižka and his time I.–IV., Prague 1927–1933
- Wallenstein I.–II., Prague 1934,
- Characters and problems of the Czech history, Prague 1990
- Diaries of Josef Pekař 1916–1933. Prague 2000

== Literature ==
In Czech:

- Deníky Josefa Pekaře 1916–1933. Prague 2000
- Ottův slovník naučný, no.19, p. 407 & no.28, p. 1025
- Ottův slovník naučný nové doby, no.8, p. 963
- Štech, V. V.:V zamlženém zrcadle. Praha : Československý spisovatel, 1969, p. 116, 119, 162, 179, 180, 181, 188
