= Soeman Hs =

Indonesian author

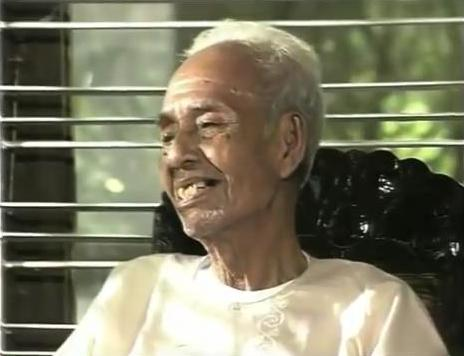
- Soeman in 1994
- Born: Soeman Hasibuan; 4 April 1904; Bengkalis, Riau, Dutch East Indies
- Died: 8 May 1999 (aged 95); Pekanbaru, Riau, Indonesia
- Known for: Promotion of education, writing
- Notable work: Mentjahari Pentjoeri Anak Perawan; Kawan Bergeloet
- Spouse: Siti Hasnah
- Children: 8

Soeman Hasibuan (Perfected Spelling: Suman Hasibuan; 4 April 1904 – 8 May 1999) better known by his pen name Soeman Hs, was an Indonesian author recognized for pioneering detective fiction and short story writing in the country's literature. Born in Bengkalis, Riau, Dutch East Indies, to a family of farmers, Soeman studied to become a teacher and, under the author Mohammad Kasim, a writer. He began working as a Malay-language teacher after completing normal school in 1923, first in Siak Sri Indrapura, Aceh, then in Pasir Pengaraian, Rokan Hulu, Riau. Around this time he began writing, publishing his first novel, Kasih Tak Terlarai, in 1929. In twelve years he published five novels, one short story collection, and thirty-five short stories and poems.

During the Japanese occupation of the Dutch East Indies (1942–1945) and subsequent revolution, Soeman—though he remained a teacher—became active in politics, serving first on a representatives' council and then as part of the Indonesian National Committee for Pasir Pengaraian in Pekanbaru. Following the Netherlands' recognition of Indonesia's independence in 1949, Soeman was made the head of the regional department of education, working to rebuild damaged infrastructure and to establish new schools, including the first senior high school in Riau and the Islamic University of Riau. He remained active in education until his death.

As an author, Soeman wrote stories which emphasized suspense and humour, drawing on Western detective and adventure fiction as well as classical Malay literature. His written Malay, with a vocabulary heavily influenced by his east Sumatran background, flowed readily and avoided excessive verbosity. Soeman's most popular work was his novel Mentjahari Pentjoeri Anak Perawan (1932), whereas his short story collection Kawan Bergeloet (1941) has been considered his most interesting from a literary perspective. Though considered a minor author of the Poedjangga Baroe period, Soeman has been recognized with an eponymous library and his books have been taught at schools.

== Early life ==
Soeman was born on 4 April 1904 in Bantan Tua, a village in Bengkalis, Riau. (Note: The date was not recorded. Soeman later stated that he had been told his year of birth by his father, but he was not certain if it was accurate (Kasiri 1993, p. 92).) His parents, Lebai Wahid Hasibuan and Turumun Lubis, had been born in Kotanopan (in what is now Mandailing Natal), but moved to Bengkalis after marriage to avoid conflict between the Hasibuans and a rival clan. In a 1989 interview, Soeman stated that he was not sure of the conflict's source, but he suspected that his father, who was descended from a Mandailing king, felt as though his honour had been impugned. He had five brothers, Raman, Riban, Abdurrachim, Hamzah, and Jumaat.

In Bengkalis, Wahid and Turumun farmed pineapples and coconuts. Wahid also taught Quran reading, which provided supplementary income for the Muslim family. As his father taught at their home, Soeman began learning to read the Quran at a young age. Meanwhile, from the traders who visited Wahid, he also heard stories of the crimes committed in major cities such as Singapore. In 1913 Soeman enrolled at a local Malay school, where his teachers reinforced the importance of reading. Soeman took this lesson to heart, reading numerous books by European and Malay authors from the school library before he graduated in 1918. (Note: Soeman recalled, in a 1994 interview, that one could say he had read all of the hundreds of books in the school library (Nasution 1998, 7:30–7:50).)

Hoping to become a teacher, Soeman tried out for a course for potential teachers in Medan, North Sumatra, soon after graduation. After he was accepted, he spent two years studying in that city. Among his teachers was Mohammad Kasim, whose later short story collection Teman Doedoek (1937) became the first such work in the Indonesian literary canon. Outside of class, Soeman would listen to Kasim's stories about authors and the creative writing process; this sparked his interest in becoming a writer. After two years in Medan, Soeman continued to a normal school in Langsa, Aceh, where he stayed until 1923. There he met his future wife, Siti Hasnah.

After graduation, Soeman found employment at HIS Siak Sri Indrapura, a Dutch-language school for indigenous students in Siak Sri Indrapura, Aceh. Soeman worked as a Malay-language teacher there for seven years, until 1930, when he met a young teacher from Java who was involved in the nationalist movement. Soeman and several other teachers joined him for discussion and to furtively play the song "Indonesia Raya", which was under a ban from the Dutch colonial government. When this was discovered, Soeman was transferred to Pasir Pengaraian, Rokan Hulu, Riau. Despite repeated requests for transfer, Soeman remained in Pasir Pengaraian until the Japanese occupation of the Dutch East Indies began in 1942, eventually being made principal.

== Personal life ==
Soeman was married to Siti Hasnah and has had six son, Syamsul Bahri, Syamsiar, Faharuddin, Mansyurdin, Burhanuddin, and Rosman, and two daughters, Sawitri and Najemah Hanum. Their marriage lasted until Soeman's death on 8 May 1999.

== Writing career ==
Soeman began writing in 1923, shortly after finishing his studies. Inspired by his father, who stopped using the clan name Hasibuan in Malay-dominated Bengkalis, he took the pen name Soeman Hs. He submitted his first novel, Kasih Tak Terlarai (Undivided Love), to the state publisher Balai Pustaka. The book, about a young orphan who elopes with his beloved but must remarry her in disguise after she returns home, was published in 1929. Soeman received a total of 37 gulden for the publication.

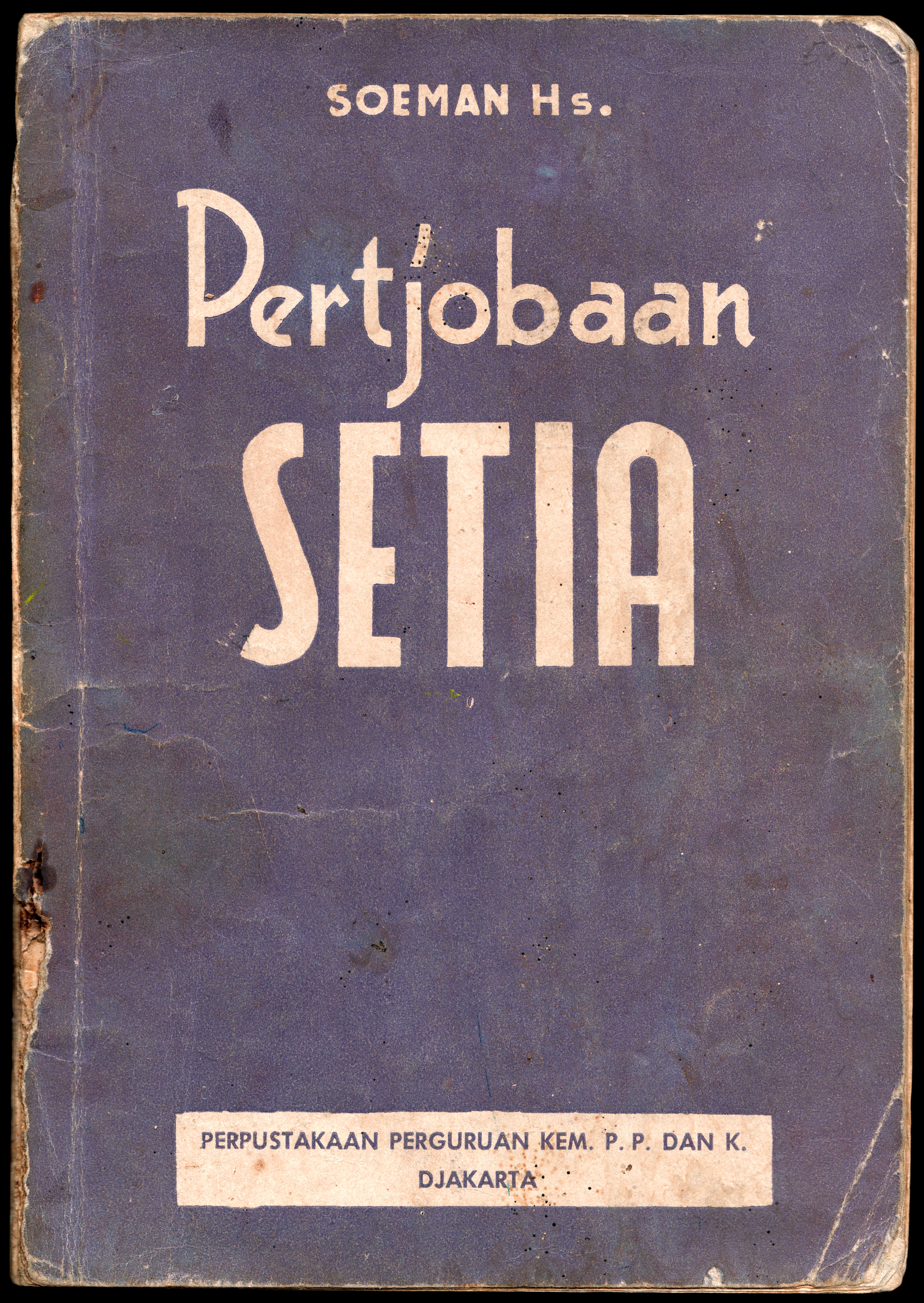
Pertjobaan Setia (1955 edition)

This was followed by Pertjobaan Setia (A Test of Faithfulness) in 1931, a novel about a young man named Sjamsoeddin who is required to go on the hajj before he can marry Hajjah Salwiah, a rich merchant's daughter. When Sjamsoeddin returns from his trip, he suffers an accident and is tricked by a man who lusts after Salwiah. Ultimately, however, Sjamsoeddin's friend Djamin is able to reveal the treachery, allowing Sjamsoeddin and Salwiah to marry. The following year, two translations of Soeman's novels were published by Balai Pustaka; Kasih Tak Terlarai was translated into Javanese as Asih tan Kena Pisah by Soehardja, while Pertjobaan Setia was translated into Sundanese as Tjotjoba by Martaperdana.

Soeman published another novel, Mentjahari Pentjoeri Anak Perawan (Seeking a Maiden's Kidnapper), in 1932. It follows Sir Joon, a man whose betrothal to Nona was called off after her father, Gadi, was offered a higher bride price. When Nona is apparently kidnapped, Joon offers his services to help find her. He builds distrust between Gadi and Nona's would-be husband, and ultimately that betrothal too is called off. Afterwards Joon leaves the village with Nona, whom he had taken from her home, and the couple lives happily in Singapore. For this novel, again published by Balai Pustaka, Soeman received 75 gulden. Over the subsequent decades, it became his most popular publication, and it has been identified as the first detective novel in the Indonesian literary canon.

Between 1932 and 1938, Soeman published two further novels, Kasih Tersesat (Lost Love; serialized in Pandji Poestaka in 1932) and Teboesan Darah (Blood Payment; published in Doenia Pengalaman in 1939). This latter novel marked the return of Sir Joon, who had featured in several other detective stories by other authors. Soeman also published thirty-five short stories and poems, mostly in the magazine Pandji Poestaka but also in Pedoman Masjarakat and Poedjangga Baroe. Seven of Soeman's Pandji Poestaka stories were compiled in Kawan Bergeloet (Playmate), together with five original stories. With this collection, published in 1941, Soeman became one of the first short story writers in the Indonesian literary canon.

== Japanese occupation and Indonesian National Revolution ==
After the Japanese occupied the Dutch East Indies in 1942, Soeman was made a school supervisor by occupying forces. He soon became involved in politics, being elected to the Shūsangikai, a Japanese-sponsored regional representatives' council, for Riau. He later recalled that, because he had been elected rather than selected by the Japanese forces—and thus had strong backing among the community, which could be used for revolution—he had felt as though he was under constant surveillance. This situation continued until after the Japanese withdrew from Indonesia and Sukarno proclaimed an independent Indonesia.

Though the Proclamation of Indonesian Independence was made on 17 August 1945, news did not reach Riau until September. In the following months, Soeman was elected to the newly formed Indonesian National Committee for Pasir Pengaraian, and later made its chairman. In this capacity, he had to strike a balance between former colonial staff who were looking forward to a Dutch return and those who supported an independent Indonesia; Dutch forces were returning to Java, and physical conflict had already broken out between Allied forces and the Indonesian republicans in Surabaya. The following year, Soeman was elected to the Regional Representatives' Council for Riau, based out of Pekanbaru.

Following Operation Kraai in 1948, in which Dutch forces conquered the republican capital at Yogyakarta and captured much of the Sukarno government, Soeman was made commander of the guerrilla forces in Riau. Aside from continuing the fight, he was tasked with finding new fighters to support the republican cause. In this mission, he was aided in part by his extensive networks as a long-term schoolteacher, and many of Soeman's fighters were former students of his. Though his troops were underarmed, Soeman led them into combat against Dutch-allied indigene troops several times.

== Educator and later life ==
Once the revolution concluded following the Dutch–Indonesian Round Table Conference of 1949, Soeman was recalled to Pekanbaru and made the head of the regional branch of the Department of Education and Culture. His main task was reestablishing and reinvigorating the education system in Riau following three years of the Japanese occupation and four years of revolution. Desks had been used for firewood, school buildings had been razed to prevent enemy forces from using them, and much of the population had been unable to attend regular classes. Furthermore, the department did not have sufficient funding to support reconstruction. Over the next three years Soeman led communal work projects dedicated to restoring Riau's education facilities, relying on voluntary contributions from the populace.

This was followed by a period of building further education infrastructure. To help elementary school teachers further their studies, Soeman took part in establishing a private junior high school in 1953. (Note: The vast majority of teachers only had an elementary-level education (Kasiri 1993, p. 102).) The following year he helped establish the Setia Dharma Senior High School, the first senior high school in Riau. Minister of Education Mohammad Yamin attended the opening ceremony, where Soeman compared the situation in Riau to that of Aceh and North Sumatra and declared that the people of Riau had been treated like stepchildren. (Note: Original: "... kami di Riau seolah-olah dianaktirikan.") He called for Yamin to send government teachers to support Setia Dharma. Though Yamin objected to Soeman's rhetoric and did not send any teachers to Setia Dharma, he did arrange for a state senior high school to be opened in Riau.

Soeman continued working to establish new schools in Riau. In the late 1950s, seeing the development of schools by Christian organizations, Soeman, working with other Muslims in Riau, began establishing Islamic schools at the kindergarten, elementary, junior high school, and senior high school level. In 1961, Governor of Riau Kaharuddin Nasution approached Soeman and asked him to join the Daily Governance Body (Note: Badan Pemerinah Harian; its function was similar to that of the Regional Representatives' Council.) of the provincial government. (Note: Following Indonesia's independence, Riau had been part of the Central Sumatra Province. Central Sumatra was divided into three provinces (West Sumatra, Jambi, and Riau) under Law No. 61 of 1958.) He did so and, working with the government, the Islamic Education Foundation established the Islamic University of Riau. Soeman conducted the formal inauguration ceremony in 1962.

Though he had formally retired as a teacher to join the Daily Governance Body, from the 1960s Soeman was involved with several education foundations. He served as general director of the Institutions of Islamic Education Foundation (Note: Yayasan Lembaga Pendidikan Islam) as well as the chairman of the Setia Dharma managing board, the Riau Education Foundation, (Note: Yayasan Pendidikan Riau) and the Riau Social and Cultural Society. (Note: Lembaga Sosial Budaya Riau) He also maintained ties with the provincial government; in 1966, he formally became part of the Regional Representatives' Council, and in 1976, at the recommendation of Governor Arifin Achmad, he went on the hajj using state funds. (Note: In a 1989 interview, Soeman said that he considered Achmad's recommendation an apology for the governor's reaction to Soeman's criticism of his policies (Kasiri 1993, p. 117).)

Soeman died in Pekanbaru on 8 May 1999, having remained active in various aspects of education in Riau until the previous year.

== Creative process and style ==
A short film on Soeman, by the Lontar Foundation (in Indonesian)

Soeman credited the adventure stories of Alexandre Dumas and similar authors, which he read in translation, for his interest in the adventure and detective genres. Soeman was interested in these stories' use of suspense, which set them apart from the works of traditionally influenced Malay authors such as Marah Rusli. According to the cultural critic Sutan Takdir Alisjahbana, Soeman, in his construction of suspense, mimicked that of Western detective stories, rather than adapt the style for an Eastern setting. Traditional influences did surface in Soeman's works, however. He credited his short stories' comedic elements to the humorous aspects of Malay folk literature such as the "Lebai Malan" (Unfortunate Quranic Teacher) tales.

The poet Eka Budianta notes that a common theme in Soeman's works was the strength of love and its ability to overcome obstacles. Soeman wrote of the power of romance and marriage for love in response to the treatment of women in adat (traditional) culture. Among the Malays of Riau, arranged marriages were common, and women would sometimes be married to men older than their father. Before marriage, young women would be secluded and unable to interact with any men except for the ones chosen to be their husbands. Similarly, Soeman used Kasih Tak Terlarai to criticize the mistreatment of orphans after adoption.

Some of Soeman's characters are not identified as indigenous Indonesians, including Nona (her name being common among the ethnic Chinese) and Sir Joon (a Eurasian). This was, in part, a bid to attract readers of different cultural backgrounds, as well as those living in Singapore. It also served to soften Soeman's criticism. In an interview, Soeman recalled: "My stories always challenged the stiff adat. So to show this, my characters were always outsiders, who could be better accepted if they went against adat. That was my strategy, as an author, so my stories could be accepted." (Note: Original: "Roman saya selalu mendobrak adat yang kaku. Nah, untuk menggambarkan itu, sengaja saya pilih tokoh orang asing, yang lebih diterima jika memberontak adat. Itu hanya strategi kepengarangan, biar cerita kita diterima.")

Soeman's diction in his short stories was strongly influenced by his east Sumatran background, with extensive Malay vocabulary and less Javanese influence than many contemporary writers. However, as with his fellow writers of the Poedjangga Baroe generation, he avoided frequently using classical Malay terms such as alkisah ('it is told') and maka ('thus'). He was critical of the extensive verbosity of earlier literature, instead attempting to use a more succinct and direct style and avoid embellishments. In a 1936 article, Alisjahbana wrote that, in Soeman's hands, "the stiff and frozen, heavily formalised, Malay language becomes fluid again". (Note: Original: "... bahasa Melajoe lama jang telah kakoe dan bekoe oleh karena telah tetap soesoenan dan atjoeannja, mendjadi tjair kembali...")

== Legacy ==
The Soeman Hs Library in Pekanbaru

Soeman's works were often used for teaching literature to junior and senior high school students, particularly in Riau, where in the 1970s they were distributed by the provincial government. One of Soeman's short stories, "Papan Reklame" ("Billboards"), was included in a Cornell University Press-published reader for foreign students of Indonesian, and HB Jassin included one of Soeman's poems, "Iman" ("Faith"), in the anthology Pudjangga Baroe (1963). In 1993, Mentjahari Pentjoeri Anak Perawan was adapted into a television serial by August Melasz.

Towards the end of Soeman's life, his books were only rarely republished and discussed, and a 2014 profile by the Tanjungpinang Center for Preserving Cultural Values describes Soeman as a forgotten educator and writer. However, Soeman's works are still anthologized, and in 2008 the Soeman Hs Library in Pekanbaru was named for him. Designed to resemble a rehal and thus reflect Islamic Malay culture, the six-storey, glass-walled library is operated by the government of Riau. In 2010, the Sagang Foundation posthumously awarded Soeman the Sagang Kencana Prize for his dedication to preserving Malay culture.

== Assessment ==
Soeman has been categorized as a minor author of the Poedjangga Baroe period. The Dutch scholar of Indonesian literature A. Teeuw writes that, though Soeman's poetry maintained a conventional form, his detective stories were "unpretentious but pleasantly written". However, he considers Soeman's short story collection, Kawan Bergeloet, his most interesting contribution to literature, owing to its "well observed and realistically described" sketches. Alisjahbana, meanwhile, praised Soeman's innovative use of Malay but considered the author's plotlines to be at times inconsequential and illogical, with the narrative acting as "a child who quick as lightning shows his toys, then hides them again to pique his friends' curiosity". (Note: Original: "... seperti kanak-kanak jang mengilatkan sekedjap mata permainannja, tetapi segera menjemboenjikannja poela oentoek membangkitkan 'keinginan hendak tahoe' pada temannja.") He considered Soeman's work best read for its entertainment value.

In a film commemorating Soeman made by the Lontar Foundation, Budianta concluded:

You can say he only wrote a few works. You can say that his works are not that popular, not that monumental, but the presence of Soeman Hs as a writer of humorous and detective stories cannot be ignored. If we try to tell of the pioneers of humour and detective fiction, well Soeman Hs was their father. He can be considered the father of humorous and detective stories. (Note: Original: "Karya-karyanya boleh dikata sedikit. Karya-karyanya boleh dikata kurang disukai, tidak terlalu monumental, tetapi kehadiran Soeman Hs sebagai penulis cerita humor dan penulis cerita detektif, itu tidak bisa diabaikan. Kalau kita mau bercerita tentang pelopor penulis humor atau pelopor cerita detektif, Soeman Hs itu bapaknya. Dia bisa dianggap bapak cerita humor dan detektif.")

— Eka Budianta, in Nasution (1998, 11:30–12:08)

== Selected bibliography ==
- Kasih Tak Terlarai (novel, 1890)
- Pertjobaan Setia (novel, 1931)
- Mentjahari Pentjoeri Anak Perawan (novel, 1932)
- Kasih Tersesat (novel, 1932)
- Teboesan Darah (novel, 1939)
- Kawan Bergeloet (short story collection; 1941)

== Works cited ==
- Alisjahbana, Sutan Takdir (1941). "Soeman Hs". Kawan Bergeloet [Playmate] (in Indonesian). Batavia: Balai Pustaka. pp. 5–13. OCLC 20651467.
- Balai Pustaka (1941). "Pengantar" [Foreword]. Kawan Bergeloet [Playmate] (in Indonesian). Batavia: Balai Pustaka. OCLC 20651467.
- Eneste, Pamusuk, ed. (1981). Leksikon Kesusastraan Indonesia Modern [Lexicon of Modern Indonesian Literature] (in Indonesian). Jakarta: Gramedia. OCLC 8785600.
- Eneste, Pamusuk (2001). Bibliografi Sastra Indonesia [Bibliography of Indonesian Literature] (in Indonesian). Magelang: Yayasan Indonesiatera. ISBN 978-979-9375-17-9.
- Herawati, Elly; Yogiyanti, Nadira Octova (28 December 2015). "Wisata Edukasi ke Perpustakaan Soeman HS Pekanbaru" [Educational Tourism to the Soeman HS Library, Pekanbaru]. Viva News (in Indonesian). Archived from the original on 5 May 2016.
- Jassin, HB (1963). Pudjangga Baru Prosa dan Puisi [Pudjangga Baru Prose and Poetry] (in Indonesian). Jakarta: Gunung Agung. OCLC 9399495.
- Jedamski, D.A. (2009). "The Vanishing Act – Sherlock Holmes in Indonesia's National Awakening". In Jedamski, D.A. (ed.). Chewing Over the West: Occidental Narratives in Non-Western Readings (PDF). Cross/Cultures. Vol. 119. Amsterdam: Rodopi. pp. 349–379. Archived from the original (PDF) on 31 May 2016.
- Kasiri, Julizar (1993). "Soeman Hs: Guru yang Berjiwa Guru" [Soeman Hs: A Teacher with the Soul of a Teacher]. Memoar: Senarasi Kiprah Sejarah [Memoir: A Narration of History] (in Indonesian). Vol. 3. Jakarta: Grafiti Press. pp. 89–118. ISBN 978-979-444-274-6.
- Kratz, Ernst Ulrich (1988). A Bibliography of Indonesian Literature in Journals: Drama, Prose, Poetry. Yogyakarta: Gadjah Mada University Press. ISBN 978-979-420-108-4.
- Mahayana, Maman S.; Sofyan, Oyon; Dian, Achmad (1992). Ringkasan dan Ulasan Novel Indonesia Modern [Summaries and Commentary on Modern Indonesian Novels] (in Indonesian). Jakarta: Grasindo. ISBN 978-979-553-123-4.
- Muhammad, Aulia A (2002). Bayang Baur Sejarah: Sketsa Hidup Penulis-penulis Besar Dunia [The Blending Shadows of History: Sketches of the Lives of the World's Greatest Writers] (in Indonesian). Tiga Serangkai. ISBN 978-979-668-401-4.
- Nasution, Arswendy (1998). Soeman Hasibuan (streamed video) (in Indonesian). Lontar Foundation. OCLC 56795585.
- "Peraih Anugerah Sagang dan Sagang Kencana Diumumkan" [Recipients of the Sagang and Sagang Kencana Award Announced]. Riau Pos (in Indonesian). 12 October 2015. Archived from the original on 2 June 2016.
- Rampan, Korrie Layun (2000). Leksikon Susastra Indonesia [Lexicon of Indonesian Literature] (in Indonesian). Jakarta: Balai Pustaka. ISBN 978-979-666-358-3.
- Rosidi, Ajip (1968). Tjerita Pendek Indonesia [Indonesian Short Stories] (in Indonesian). Jakarta: Gunung Agung. OCLC 348467.
- "Soeman HS: Tokoh Sastra dan Pendidikan yang Terlupakan" [Soeman HS: A Forgotten Figure in Literature and Education] (in Indonesian). Tanjungpinang Center for Preserving Cultural Values. 6 June 2014. Archived from the original on 7 September 2015.
- Teeuw, A. (2013). Modern Indonesian Literature. Leiden: KITLV Press. ISBN 978-94-015-0768-4.
- Wolff, John Ulrich (1978). Indonesian Readings. Ithaca: Cornell University Press. OCLC 923614542.
