= Kawan Bergeloet =

Book by Soeman Hs

- Cover, first edition
- Author: Soeman Hs
- Cover artist: Nasroen A.S.
- Language: Indonesian
- Genre: Short story collection
- Publisher: Balai Pustaka
- Publication date: 1941
- Publication place: Indonesia
- Pages: 50
- OCLC: 20651467

Kawan Bergeloet (Perfected Spelling: Kawan Bergelut; Indonesian for "Playmate") is a collection of short stories written by Soeman Hs and first published by Balai Pustaka in 1941. It contains twelve stories, seven of which were previously published in the magazine Pandji Poestaka, as well as an introduction by Sutan Takdir Alisjahbana. These stories are generally humorous in nature, and presented with a diction that shows strong east Sumatran influences.

Released in response to the commercial success of Muhammad Kasim's collection Teman Doedoek, Kawan Bergeloet has been reprinted several times and received positive critical appraisal. Soeman, together with Kasim, has since been considered a pioneer of the Indonesian short story. The Dutch scholar of Indonesian literature A. Teeuw writes that the collection is Soeman's most interesting contribution to Indonesian literature.

== Background ==
Short stories and sketches in Malay have been recorded in Indonesia since the 1870s, and a short story collection—H. Kommer's Warna Sari—was published in 1912. These early stories used vernacular Malay and were often humorous or derived from fairy tales or detective fiction. Short story-writing developed further in the 1920s and 1930s, when short stories and sketches in a more formal register of Malay were widely published in such magazines as Pandji Poestaka and Poedjangga Baroe. The first collection of short stories in the Indonesian literary canon, Muhammad Kasim's Teman Doedoek, was published by Balai Pustaka in 1937. This collection was a commercial success, selling 4,000 copies by 1941.

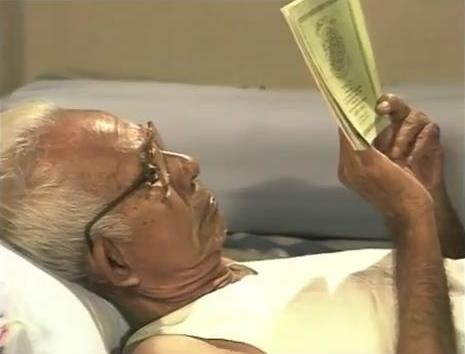
Soeman HS in 1994

Teman Doedoek was read by Soeman Hs, a Bengkalis-born teacher who had already gained popularity as a writer of detective fiction. Soeman, once a student of Kasim's, had also experimented with more humorous story-telling approaches, including in his novel Pertjobaan Setia as well as in the numerous short stories he had published through Pandji Pustaka. After the commercial success of Teman Doedoek, Balai Pustaka sought to release a new short story collection; thus, Soeman was contacted.

== Contents ==
Kawan Bergeloet contains twelve short stories or sketches written by Soeman, seven of which had initially been written for and published in Pandji Poestaka. The remaining stories were written especially for the new collection. The first edition included an article on Soeman, written by Sutan Takdir Alisjahbana, which had previously been published in the January 1936 issue of Pedoman Pembatja. This has been excluded from some later reissues.

=== "Tjik Mat" ===
"Tjik Mat" (Perfected Spelling: "Cik Mat") follows a young man named Mat who goes fishing by the riverside. After three casts he is unable to catch any fish. On the fourth cast, he hooks a fish, but it falls into the waters. The story was first published in 1933, in issue 13, volume 11, of Pandji Poestaka.

=== "Piloe" ===
"Piloe" (Perfected Spelling: "Pilu", meaning "Melancholia"), follows a mother who goes to the port with her child, Mak Jam, to meet her husband Hajji Saleh. Upon arriving, Jam is unable to find him. A crewman later tells the mother that Saleh died three days before reaching Sabang. The story was first published in 1933, in issue 40, volume 11, of Pandji Poestaka.

=== "Salah Paham" ===
"Salah Paham" (meaning "Misunderstanding") follows Kari Boengsoe, a gambir merchant, who travels to Singapore after turning a tidy profit. When his escort leaves, Kari goes to a nearby restaurant for dinner. The waiter asks him, "Kari apa?", (Note: Variously translatable as "What does Kari want?", "What curry?", and "What is Kari?") to which Kari replies that he wants to eat. This exchange is repeated several times until the waiter asks "Kari ajam? Kari kambing?" (Note: Variously translatable as "Chicken curry? Goat curry?" or "Kari is a chicken. Kari is a goat.") Kari and the waiter begin fighting, and the police are called. When they arrive, they realize the source of the confusion, explain it, and leave. Shortly afterwards, the incident is repeated when Kari and the waiter have a misunderstanding over an ice cube. According to Balai Pustaka, "Salah Paham" was previously published. However, Ernst Kratz, in his bibliography of literature published in Indonesian magazines, does not note any publication.

=== "Salah Sangka" ===
"Salah Sangka" (meaning "Mistaken Expectations") follows Malim Boengsoe, a respected man from a small village, who—having had four daughters—desperately wants a son. He prays continuously, and his wife becomes pregnant. Nine months later, when she begins labour, Malim is busy praying for a son. An escaped criminal sneaks into the room of Malim's wife, and she and the other women there scream out "Laki-laki! Laki-laki!" (Note: Variously translatable as "A man! A man!" or "A boy! A boy!".) Malim praises God and goes to the room as the criminal escapes. When Malim arrives and asks for his son, he is confused, as there is no one else there. The story was first published in 1933, in issue 59, volume 11, of Pandji Poestaka.

=== "Pandai Djatoeh" ===
"Pandai Djatoeh" (Perfected Spelling: "Pandai Jatuh", meaning "The Clever Falls") describes an incident involving three old men at a wedding. When the hosts pass out betel to be chewed, the first man takes out a golden mortar to crush the betel. He boasts that the only shortcoming of such a mortar was that the betel tasted somewhat sour. The second man then takes out his silver mortar and says that, with silver, the betel would only taste sour if left for too long. The third man, the poorest of them all, takes out his wooden mortar and says that, having tried golden and silver mortars, he has concluded that betel crushed under wood tastes the best of all. The story was first published in 1933, in issue 60, volume 11, of Pandji Poestaka.

=== "Karena Hati" ===
"Karena Hati" (meaning "Because of the Heart") follows a man who becomes an official in a small village. There, he marries Sitti Aminah, a young woman who, though only 20 years of age, has been married and divorced three times. Their marriage does not last long, and the man leaves Aminah three days before the Eid al-Fitr holiday. However, his expensive set of black clothing, which he must wear during the Eid ceremonies, is accidentally left at Aminah's home. Pretending to be sick, the man goes to Aminah and asks her to cover him with clothing and light a fire to keep him warm. When she starts a fire in the kitchen, the man escapes with his black clothes. The story was first published in 1936, in issues 100 and 101, volume 14, of Pandji Poestaka.

=== "Fatwa Membawa Ketjewa" ===
"Fatwa Membawa Ketjewa" (Perfected Spelling: "Fatwa Membawa Kecewa", meaning "Preaching Brings Disappointment") follows a Lebai Saleh, a labourer and student of Islam who is known for being greedy and miserly and was once driven out of a village for offering an insultingly low bride price. When arriving in a new village, he is taken on as an Islamic teacher. In his sermons Saleh, hoping that his students will give him some goods, preaches the importance of charity. He is soon receiving chickens and fish, and has married a local woman. During a meal, Saleh again gives a sermon on charity, but he and his wife fight soon afterwards after she gives some bowls and plates to other women. Saleh's nature is revealed, and he is again forced to flee. The story was first published in 1938, in issues 93 and 94, volume 16, of Pandji Poestaka.

=== "Itoelah Asalkoe Tobat" ===
"Itoelah Asalkoe Tobat" (Perfected Spelling: "Itulah Asalku Tobat", meaning "Thus Did I Repent") tells of Hajji Malik, a former criminal who became devoted to his prayers in his old age. A fellow villager goes to see Malik and asks why he abandoned his criminal ways and embraced Islam. Malik tells his visitor that, fifteen years previously, he and a friend were travelling through the forests when they saw some people burying a box. That night they dug up the box and tried to take it away, hoping it would be treasure. However, upon opening the box, they found it contained the body of a young child. They returned the box and Malik abandoned the life of a criminal. This story was written for Kawan Bergeloet.

=== "Selimoet Bertoeah" ===
"Selimoet Bertoeah" (Perfected Spelling: "Selimut Bertuah", meaning "The Magical Blanket") follows Tji' Dang, a man who is terrified of his wife. During Ramadhan, he is sent to buy a blanket but, on the way home, a wayward cigar burns a hole in the blanket. Afraid of what his wife will say, Dang buys another blanket. The first blanket is given to Dang's stepson, Boejoeng. Later that week, Dang tries to break the fast early by stealing some biscuits. Rather than be found out by his stepson, Dang convinces Boejoeng to cover his head with his blanket. That evening Boejoeng, having seen Dang take the biscuits through the hole in the blanket, demands that his stepfather double his allowance or else he will reveal Dang's secret. This story was written for Kawan Bergeloet.

=== "Salah Mengerti" ===
"Salah Mengerti" (meaning "Misunderstanding") follows two young boys: an Indian boy from Madras and a Malay boy nicknamed Pengkar. While out selling their wares, Tambi and Pengkar begin fighting owing to their inability to understand each other. This begins with fighting over their sales cry. This is followed by an argument regarding holy basil and poison ivy which ends with the Indian boy rubbing the poison ivy against his buttocks out of contempt. According to Balai Pustaka, this story was written for Kawan Bergeloet. However, Kratz records it as first being published in 1933, in issue 51, volume 11, of Pandji Poestaka.

=== "Papan Reklame" ===
"Papan Reklame" (meaning "Billboards") follows two shopkeeper, a man and a woman, who compete to offer the lowest prices. Both open their shops within days of each other, and they continually undercut each other's prices to attract customers. This conflict reaches the point that one shopkeeper, Wan Saleh, decides to buy out his competitor at cost. She agrees, and Saleh sells these wares, advertising a 5% markup. When he hears that his competitor will go to Singapore to buy new wares, Saleh follows her. When they are on the ship, it is revealed that the shopkeepers are actually husband and wife, and that he had actually bought her stock out with a 10% markup; as such, the customers paid a total markup of 15%. This story was written for Kawan Bergeloet.

=== "Kelakar Si Bogor" ===
"Kelakar Si Bogor" (meaning "The Antics of Bogor") follows the betting of a dockworker named Bogor. To introduce himself to some Arab sailors, he convinces them to bet on splitting purple mangosteens. After winning $4.50, Bogor reveals his secret: he has been reusing mangosteen skins to add to his count. Bogor returns the money, and the sailors leave. On another occasion, Bogor bets a young sailor that all of the thirty eggs his chicken has laid will hatch. When the sailor returns and finds thirty chicks, he is shocked, and gives Bogor $10. Bogor later reveals to his friend, the narrator, that only twenty eggs had hatched, and that he had purchased the other ten. This story was written for Kawan Bergeloet.

== Style ==
The Indonesian literary scholar Ajip Rosidi writes that the vast majority of the stories in Kawan Bergeloet are meant as comedy. He considers only one story—"Piloe"—to have been intended as more serious or sad. Several of the stories use tropes previously seen in Kasim's Teman Doedoek, such as conflict arising from a misunderstanding, and the contents of some other stories are similar.

For Kawan Bergeloet, Soeman wrote in Indonesian, a language based on formal Malay. His diction and phrasing was strongly influenced by his east Sumatran background, with little influence from the language as spoken in Java. Rosidi considers his language to flow more easily than Kasim's. John Wolff, the author of Indonesian Readings, sees Soeman as using "flourishes which echo folk-tale stories".

== Publication and reception ==
Kawan Bergeloet was published by Balai Pustaka in 1941, with the series number 1426. (Note: Several sources, such as Rosidi (1968, p. 35) and Aveling (2009, p. 244), give the year as 1938. However, the next book in the Balai Pustaka series, Taman Penghiboer Hati: Beberapa Tjatatan Pergaoelan (BP 1427), was printed in 1941.) The collection's title, Kawan Bergeloet, has variously been translated as Playmates, Comrades Wrestling, and Argumentative Companions; the word bergeloet, in Indonesian, can mean either "to wrestle" or "to laugh". Rosidi, identifying bergeloet as meaning "to laugh", writes that the title was meant to indicate that the book was intended for entertainment purposes, to be read in one's spare time.

Soeman gained recognition as a pioneer of the Indonesian short story for Kawan Bergeloet, and over subsequent decades was commonly mentioned with Kasim in histories of the literary form. The collection has been reissued several times. The third printing, in 1950, introduced an updated spelling as well as nine illustrations by "Nasjah". The most recent edition was published in 1997. The story "Papan Reklame" was reprinted in Indonesian Readings, a student reader for Indonesian as a foreign language, in 1978.

Rosidi writes that Soeman's greatest strength in Kawan Bergeloet is in his description. He considers the writer to have avoided clichéd descriptions, instead using "new and original" descriptions, metaphors, and turns of phrase. Rosidi considers some of the stories' comic incidents to be overly complicated, but attributes this to Soeman's previous activity in the detective genre. The Dutch scholar of Indonesian literature A. Teeuw finds the sketches in Kawan Bergeloet to be "well-observed and realistically described" and Soeman's most interesting contribution to Indonesian literature.

== Works cited ==
- Aveling, Harry (2009). "Some landmarks in the development of the Indonesian short story". In Yamada, Teri Shaffer (ed.). Modern Short Fiction of Southeast Asia: A Literary History. Ann Arbor: Association for Asian Studies. ISBN 978-0-924304-52-1.
- Balai Pustaka (1941). "Pengantar" [Foreword]. Kawan Bergeloet [Playmate] (in Indonesian). Batavia: Balai Pustaka. OCLC 20651467.
- Balfas, Muhammad (1976). "Modern Indonesian Literature in Brief". In Brakel, L. F. (ed.). Handbuch der Orientalistik [Handbook of Orientalistics]. Vol. 1. Leiden, Netherlands: E. J. Brill. ISBN 978-90-04-04331-2.
- Budianta, Melani (2005). "Kolase Multikultural Sang Tukang Cerita: Cerpen Indonesia 1870-an – 1910-an" [The Multicultural Collage of the Story-Teller: Indonesian Short Stories of the 1870s to the 1910s]. In Damono, Sapardi Djoko; et al. (eds.). Nona Koelit Koetjing: Antologi Cerita Pendek Indonesia Periode Awal (1870-an – 1910-an) [Nona Koelit Koetjing: An Anthology of Early Indonesian Short Stories (1870s–1910s)] (in Indonesian). Jakarta: Language Centre, Department of National Education. ISBN 978-979-685-525-4.
- "Kawan Bergelut" [Playmate]. WorldCat. Archived from the original on 22 April 2016.
- Kratz, Ernst Ulrich (1988). A Bibliography of Indonesian Literature in Journals: Drama, Prose, Poetry. Yogyakarta: Gadjah Mada University Press. ISBN 978-979-420-108-4.
- Mahayana, Maman S.; Sofyan, Oyon; Dian, Achmad (1992). Ringkasan dan Ulasan Novel Indonesia Modern [Summaries and Commentary on Modern Indonesian Novels] (in Indonesian). Jakarta: Grasindo. ISBN 978-979-553-123-4.
- Muhammad, Aulia A (2002). Bayang Baur Sejarah: Sketsa Hidup Penulis-penulis Besar Dunia [The Blending Shadows of History: Sketches of the Lives of the World's Greatest Writers]. 2002: Tiga Serangkai. ISBN 978-979-668-401-4.
- National Department of Education (2008). Kamus Besar Bahasa Indonesia [Great Dictionary of the Indonesian Language] (in Indonesian) (4th ed.). Jakarta: Gramedia. ISBN 978-979-22-3841-9.
- Rampan, Korrie Layun (2000). Leksikon Susastra Indonesia [Lexicon of Indonesian Literature]. Jakarta: Balai Pustaka. ISBN 978-979-666-358-3.
- Rosidi, Ajip (1968). Tjerita Pendek Indonesia [Indonesian Short Stories] (in Indonesian). Jakarta: Gunung Agung. OCLC 348467.
- Rosidi, Ajip (2013). Ikhtisar Sejarah Sastera Indonesia [A Brief History of Indonesian Literature] (in Indonesian). Jakarta: Pustaka Jaya. ISBN 978-979-419-414-0.
- Soeman Hs (1941). Kawan Bergeloet [Playmate] (in Indonesian). Batavia: Balai Pustaka. OCLC 20651467.
- Soeman Hs (1950). Kawan Bergelut [Playmate] (in Indonesian). Jakarta: Balai Pustaka. OCLC 28055623.
- Teeuw, A. (2013). Modern Indonesian Literature. Leiden: KITLV Press. ISBN 978-94-015-0768-4.
- Wolff, John Ulrich (1978). Indonesian Readings. Ithaca: Cornell University Press. OCLC 923614542.
