= Budianta =

Budianta is an Indonesian surname. Notable people with the surname include:

- Eka Budianta (born 1956), Indonesian poet
- Melani Budianta (born 1954), Indonesian culture scholar, wife of the above
