= Mohidden Mosque, Lakshadweep =

Mosque in Lakshadweep, India

Mohidden Mosque
- Location of the mosque in Lakshadweep

Religion
- Affiliation: Islam
- Ecclesiastical or organisational status: Mosque
- Status: Active

Location
- Location: Kavaratti Island, Lakshadweep
- Country: India
- Coordinates: 10°34′26″N 72°38′21″E

Architecture
- Type: Mosque architecture
- Style: Indo-Islamic
- Completed: 17th century

Specifications
- Dome: One
- Minaret: Two

The Mohidden Mosque, also known as the Ujra Mosque, is a mosque located on Kavaratti Island in Lakshadweep, territory of India. A well in the precinct of the mosque contains water with reportedly curative powers.

== Overview ==
The Mohidden Mosque lies to the northwest of the island. The 17th century structure has an ornate ceiling, said to have been carved out of a single of driftwood. The mosque's pillars are also intricately carved. According to a local legend, inspiration for the intricate driftwood carvings was drawn from the leaf of a plant. When the carver thought of recreating it in his house, a piece of wood hit his eyes and he lost his sight.

Sheikh Mohammad Kasim's grave is located in the same mosque and is revered by the islanders.

== See also ==
- Islam in India
- List of mosques in India
