= Irma Ratiani =

Georgian literary theorist, comparatist and translator

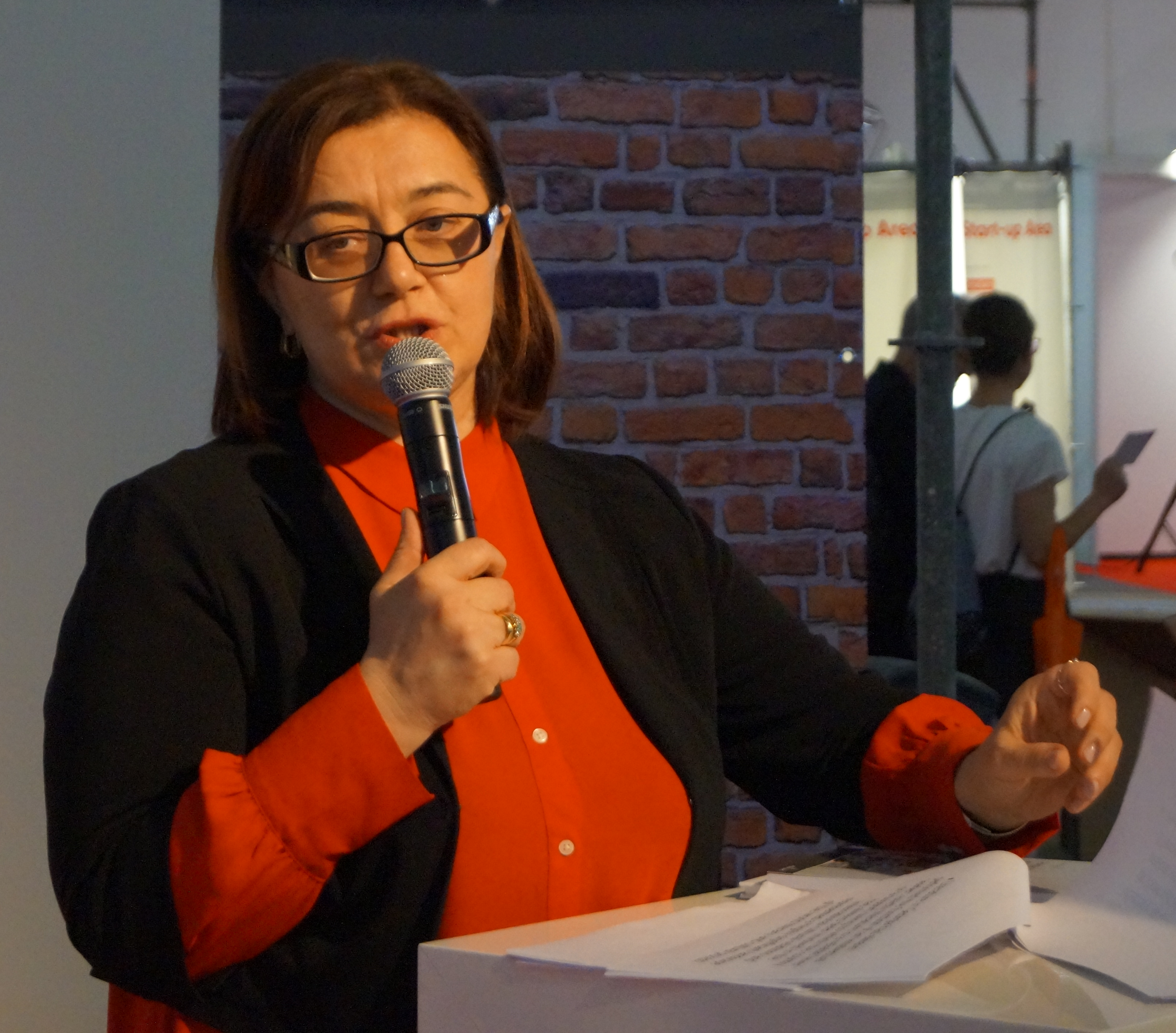
Irma Ratiani, 2018

Irma Ratiani (Georgian: ირმა რატიანი) is a literary theoretician, comparatist and translator, Doctor of Philological Sciences (2003), Professor (2004) at Tbilisi State University, Head of the Department of General and Comparative Literary Studies (since 2006); Director of the research center - Shota Rustaveli Institute of Georgian Literature (since 2006); President og Georgian Comparative Literatue Association (GCLA). SInce 2022 she is a member of the EC of International Comparative Literature Association (ICLA), and chair of GP Committee.

Born in Tbilisi, Georgia, Irma Ratiani graduated from the Tbilisi State University (specialization Theory of Literature). She received Candidate of Philological Sciences degree from Tbilisi State University, and Doctor of Philological Sciences (PhD) degree, at the same University.

From 2004-2006 she was a Head of the Department of Literary Theory at Shota Rustaveli Institute of Georgian Literature. From 2006 to present she is a Director of Shota Rustaveli Institute of Georgian Literature. From 2006 to present she is a Head of the Department of General and Comparative Literary Studies at Tbilisi State University. She received JSPS Japan Society for the Promotion of Science Scholarship for three times and was working at the Faculty of Language and Culture, at Osaka University, Japan. In 2005 she received US State Department Scholarship, in the framework of University Partnership Program and was a visiting scholar at Central Asia-Caucasus Institute and Johns Hopkins University. She received a number of international scholarships, including: DAAD Scholarship and Cambridge University scholarship. She is a multiple recipient of Erasmus and Erasmus + scholarships for academics.

The major field of her scientific interest includes: literary theory, general and comparative literary studies in a broad cultural context; analysis of various literary genres and directions, literary schools and formations in the frame of international cultural and literary processes, by using contemporary methodologies and approaches; revision and analysis of literary processes of Soviet and Post-Soviet period.

She is an author and co-author of several monographs, books, textbooks and more than 100 scientific articles, including:

Handbook of Georgian Literature. Brill, 2025. https://brill.com/display/title/64805?language=en&srsltid=AfmBOoqxmeUe2HCaaQcnQzER_iEbVnihNngyKdwEkKBoTB9KSG9XtfJj

Poetics of Drama with Georgian Accent. Tbilisi University Press, 2025. In Georgian.

Identifying Cultural Intersections in the Works of Shota Rustaveli and Nizami Ganjavi. Cambridge Svholars Publishing, 2024. https://www.taylorfrancis.com/books/edit/10.65325/EB11077/identifying-cultural-intersections-works-shota-rustaveli-nizami-ganjavi-irma-ratiani-maka-elbakidze

Anti-utopian Mood, Liminality, and Literature. Peter Lang GmbH, 2020. https://www.peterlang.com/document/1111516

Georgian Literature and the World Literary Process. Peter Lang GmbH, 2018. https://www.peterlang.com/document/1062463

She is an editor of several international editions, including:

Handbook of Georgian Literature. Brill, 2025. https://brill.com/display/title/64805?language=en&srsltid=AfmBOoqxmeUe2HCaaQcnQzER_iEbVnihNngyKdwEkKBoTB9KSG9XtfJj

Identifying Cultural Intersections in the Works of Shota Rustaveli and Nizami Ganjavi. Cambridge Svholars Publishing, 2024. https://www.taylorfrancis.com/books/edit/10.65325/EB11077/identifying-cultural-intersections-works-shota-rustaveli-nizami-ganjavi-irma-ratiani-maka-elbakidze

Literature in Exile: Emigrants' Fiction. 20th Century Experience, Cambridge Svholars Publishing, 2016. https://books.google.ge/books/about/Literature_in_Exile.html?id=q_0nvgAACAAJ&redir_esc=y

Totalitarianism and Literary Discourse. 20th Century Experience", Cambridge Scholars Publishing, 2012. https://books.google.ge/books/about/Totalitarianism_and_Literary_Discourse.html?id=IL4wtwAACAAJ&redir_esc=y

== Others ==
Editor in Chief of Annual Scientific Journal of Literary Theory and Comparative Literature published in Georgia - Sjani (The Thoughts); In 2022, under her leadership, the Congress of the International Comparative Literature Association (ICLA) was held in Tbilisi. In 2018-2022 she was an invited professor to Sand Diego University Georgia.

== Awards ==
2026 Awarded the Georgian Theatre Society Prize for the Best Theoretical Work

2022 Awarded with the Golden Medal of Tbilisi State University for Academic Breakthrough

2019 Awarded with Saguramo Literary Prize for Literary Criticism

2013 Awarded with the Presidential Order of Excellence

2013 Awarded with the Taras Shevchenko Order of Honor

2012 Awarded with Grigol Kiknadze Prize for the best monography

== Bibliography ==
- Monographs

Poetics of Drama with Georgian Accent, 2025

Antiutopian Mood, Liminality and Literature, 2020

Georgian Literature and the World Literary Process, 2018

Text and Chronotope, 2010

Chronotope in Ilia Chavchavadze's Fiction, 2006

Chronotope in the Anti-utopian Fiction. Interpretation of an Eschatological Anti-utopia, 2005

- Published Scientific Books:

Literary Genres, 2023

Literary Trends and Directions, 2018

Introduction to Literary Studies, 2012

Fable and Plot, 2011

Genre Theory, 2009

Theory of Literature. The Basic Methodological Conceptions and Schools of XX century, 2008

- Published Text-books:

Traditions of European Drama and a New Georgian Theatre, 2012

Lectures in the Literary Theory. Theoretical Conception of Mikhail Bakhtin (theory of genre, dialogism, theory of chronotop); Anthropological Theoretical Conception (liminal theory of time and space), 2005

Lectures in the Literary Theory. Theory of Genre. Formation and development, 2005

- Published Essayistic Book

Japanese Diaries, 2000, 2002

- Published Translation with Comments

100 Verses from Old Japan, 2008
