= Melani Budianta =

Indonesian literature expert and lecturer

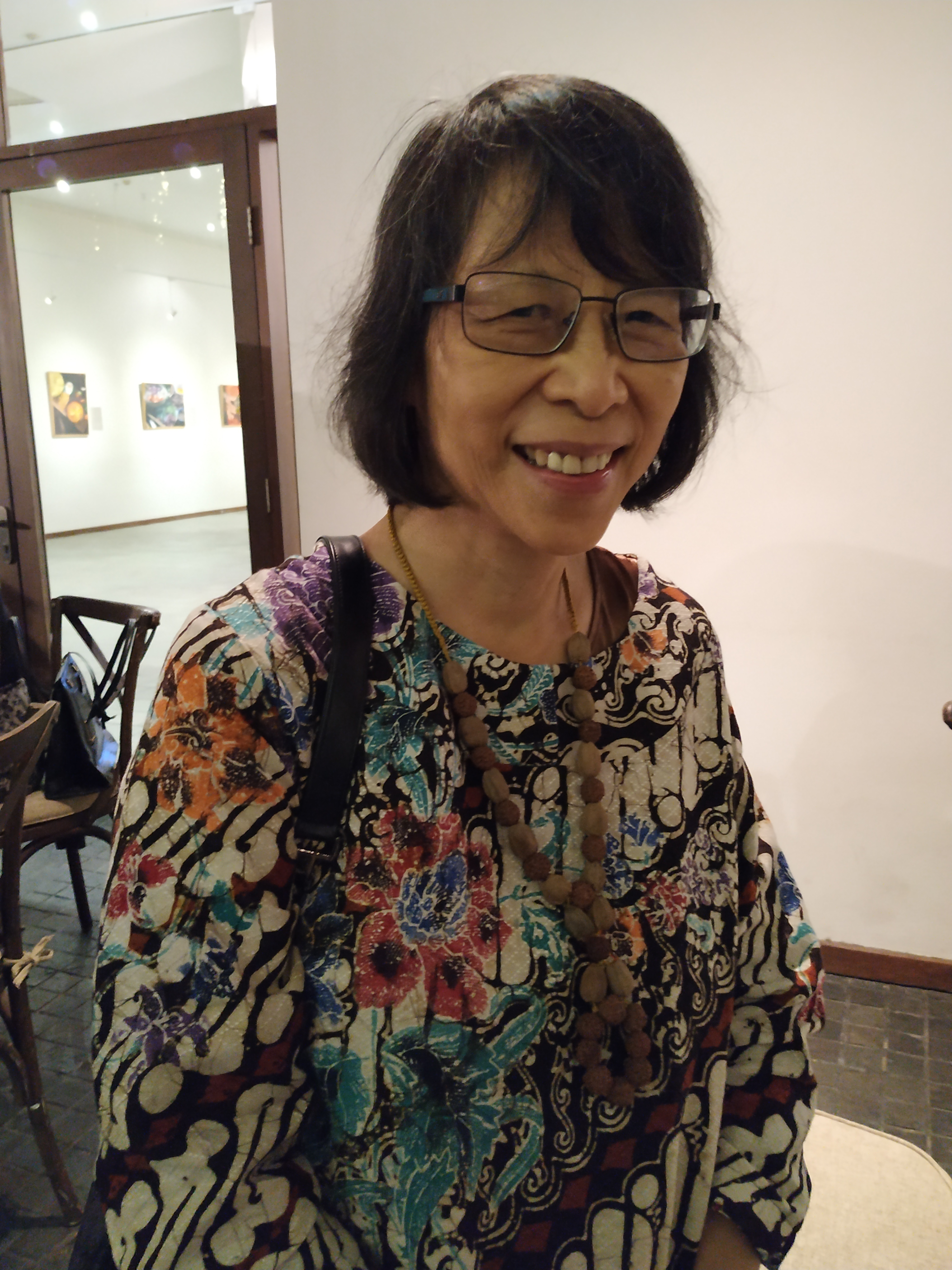
- Born: Tan Tjiok Sien; 16 May 1954 (age 72); Malang, East Java
- Education: University of Indonesia; University of Southern California; Cornell University
- Known for: Studies on feminism, postcolonialism, and multiculturalism
- Spouse: Eka Budianta
- Scientific career
- Fields: Literature, feminism
- Thesis: A Glimpse of Another World: Representations of Difference and 'Race': Stephen Crane and the American 1890s (1992)

Melanita Pranaya Budianta (born 16 May 1954), born Tan Tjiok Sien and better known as Melani Budianta, is an Indonesian scholar of feminism, postcolonialism, and multiculturalism.

Born in Malang, East Java, Budianta learned a culture of reading from her family. She enroled at the University of Indonesia, marrying fellow student Eka Budianta in 1977 and receiving a degree in English literature two years later. On scholarships from the Fulbright Programme, she received her master's degree from the University of Southern California in 1981 and her doctoral degree from Cornell University in 1992. In 2006, she was made a full professor at the University of Indonesia, where she began teaching in the 1980s.

Budianta has written extensively on English and Indonesian literature, dealing with subjects such as popular literature, otherness, and hybridity. Initially an assimilationist, following the gender- and race-based violence that surrounded the fall of Soeharto she began to explore the questions of intersectionality. She has been active in women's and human rights movements.

== Early life ==
Budianta was born in Malang, East Java, on 16 May 1954, the third daughter and fifth of seven children born to Jauhari Pranaya and Nuryati. Budianta's father was active with the Catholic Party of Indonesia. Both parents were teachers, and promoted a culture of reading in the household, to the point where books and crafts were the only birthday presents given. From an older sibling, Budianta learned creative writing. At the age of twelve, she won a writing competition sponsored by the magazine Si Kuncung for her story "Adikku Sayang" ("My Dear Younger Sibling").

The Tan family was of peranakan Chinese heritage. Having lived in Java for several generations, they no longer spoke Chinese, but embraced Javanese culture. In the colonial era, Budianta's father had spent time with a touring theatre troupe, and through his connections he obtained free tickets to stage performances. Budianta thus watched a variety of shows, including wayang wong and ludruk, as well as glove puppetry at the local Chinese temple. She also learned to play gamelan, and performed during several wayang stagings.

Budianta's family promoted the assimilation of Chinese Indonesians into the national culture. In a 2006 interview, she recalled that in her childhood she experienced discrimination for her Chinese heritage, such that she felt a sense of self-hatred and disliked hearing spoken Mandarin. Such prejudice was common in contemporary Indonesia; persons who were more culturally affiliated with China tended to view those who assimilated with disdain, and vice versa.

Budianta began her formal education at St. Maria II Elementary School, Malang. Although the school had no library, literacy was promoted by having students bring books from home, write their names on them, and collect them in a box in the classroom. The children thus developed their own lending library, with Budianta – whose parents had an extensive collection – contributing numerous works. After Budianta graduated in 1966, the family moved to Bandung, West Java. Budianta enroled at St. Angela Junior High School, graduating in 1969. She completed her senior high school studies in 1972 at St. Angela Senior High School.

== Tertiary education ==
Although Budianta had completed her secondary studies in the natural sciences programme, she desired to major in literature in university. Her parents initially opposed the idea, wanting her to take up stenography, but after an older sibling who had studied medicine failed to graduate, they gave their blessings. Budianta thus enroled at the English literature programme of the University of Indonesia, graduating in 1979.

Concurrently with her baccalaureate studies, she taught street children in Tanah Abang, Jakarta, how to write in the Indonesian language; this was intended to support a project of the Ursuline order. Recalling the experience in 2023, Budianta described it as highlighting how the theories she learned in the classroom were difficult to apply in real-world situations. One student, disheartened after his work was the only one not to be posted to the classroom walls, left the class. Another seemed suspicious due to Budianta's religious and ethnic background.

After graduating, Budianta began writing and publishing articles on Indonesian literature. She received a scholarship through the Fulbright Programme in 1980, and departed for the University of Southern California in Los Angeles, California. She lived in a slum near the campus, observing the dynamics of the city – including its gangs and its members of the Unification Church – and contrasted the expression of diversity in the United States with contemporary Indonesia's suppression and censorship of its own diversity. In 1981, she received her master's degree in American Studies. After returning to Indonesia, Budianta became a faculty member of the University of Indonesia. She served as the secretary of the women's studies programme between 1982 and 1985.

Budianta received a second Fulbright Scholarship in 1988. She undertook her doctoral studies in English literature at Cornell University in Ithaca, New York, graduating in 1992 with a dissertation on the representation of otherness in the works of Stephen Crane. Returning again to Indonesia, she became the secretary of the Department of Literature at the University of Indonesia. This was followed by terms as the secretary of the university's English department in 2002 and the director of its English department in 2003.

== Academic career ==
During the New Order regime of President Soeharto, the practice of Chinese culture in Indonesia was stifled. After the fall of Soeharto in 1998, Budianta began to explore the arts and philosophy of Chinese Indonesians. She also began focusing more on cultural identities in her research. Outside of academia, she became more involved in activism, noting the gender- and race-based violence that had accompanied the May 1998 riots. Holding that her academic achievement was not comprehensive without application, Budianta became involved in the women's and human rights movements.

On 28 January 2006, Budianta was made a full professor at the Faculty of Humanities, University of Indonesia. In her commencement speech, "Meretas Batas: Humaniora dalam Perubahan" ("Breaking Barriers: The Humanities in Transformation"), she discussed her experiences within the context of the barriers to education. As professor, she initiated a shift toward cultural studies, promoting the contextualization of literary works through intersectionality. Through public lectures and classroom lessons, students were exposed to varied non-literary subjects such as anthropology and the lived experiences of street children and medical patients.

In 2023, Budianta received the Sarwono Award for her contributions to the humanities. In its press release, the National Research and Innovation Agency described her as a pioneer in the development of cultural studies in Indonesia.

== Family ==
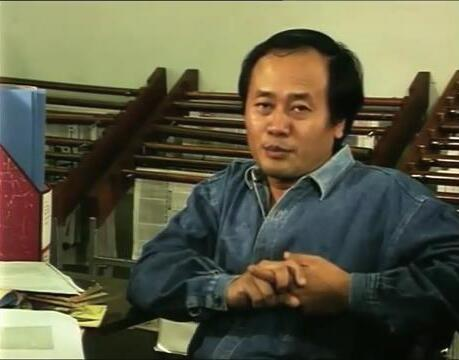
Budianta's husband Eka Budianta

In 1977, Budianta married the poet Eka Budianta, whom she met while they were enroled at the University of Indonesia. The couple have three children: Theresia Citraningtyas (born 1977), Gregorius Pandusetia (born 1983), and Maria Anindyaswari (born 1994). Budianta's sister, Yunita Triwardhani Winarto, is an anthropologist who has taught at the University of Indonesia and at Gadjah Mada University.

== Academic contributions ==
Budianta has written extensively about feminism, postcolonialism, and multiculturalism, frequently using literary works as a starting point for exploring real-world phenomena. She has written and published extensively on American and Indonesian literature, with the newspaper Kompas highlighting her humorous yet insightful insights into popular literature, from its content through its presentation in bookstores. She has argued that literature, which tends to be ignored by those in power, often serves as the voice of the oppressed, offering "different perspectives, which sometimes we don't know because we're too caught up with our own community and people who are similar to us."

Her studies have included explorations of women's activism following the May 1998 riots, as well as the literary construction of housemaids. She has also explored the subject of Chinese Indonesian identity, including its practice during the 1997 Asian financial crisis as well as its manifestation through the dragon dance. In her understanding of Chinese Indonesian identity, Budianta has emphasized a concept of hybridity, wherein Chinese and indigenous cultures intertwine. She has served on the editorial boards of several academic journals, including Inter-Asia Cultural Studies, American Anthology for Asian Readers, and Malay Journal. She has also advised several organizations, including the Lontar Foundation and Suara Ibu Peduli (Voice of Concerned Mothers).

== Selected works ==
=== Books ===
- Wellek, René; Warren, Austin (1993). Teori Kesusastraan [Theory of Literature]. Translated by Melani Budianta. Jakarta: Gramedia Pustaka Utama. ISBN 9789794034545.
- Budianta, Melani (2002). Membaca Sastra: Pengantar Memahami Sastra untuk Perguruan Tinggi [Reading Literature: An Introduction to Understanding Literature for Higher Education]. Magelang: IndonesiaTera. ISBN 9789799375841.
- Budianta, Melani; Tiwon, Sylvia, eds. (2003). Trajectories of Memory: Excavating the Past in Indonesia. Springer. ISBN 978-981-99-1995-6.
- Toha-Sarumpaet, Riris K.; Budianta, Melani, eds. (2010). Membaca Sapardi [Reading Sapardi] (in Indonesian). Jakarta: Obor Foundation. ISBN 9786024331986.
- Winarto, Yunita T.; Hidayat, Rahayu S.; Budianta, Melani, eds. (2019). Meretas Batas Ilmu: Perjalanan Intelektual Guru Besar Sosial Humaniora [Breaking through the Boundaries of Science: The Intellectual Journeys of Professors of Society and Humanities] (in Indonesian). Jakarta: Obor Foundation. ISBN 9786024338145.

=== Book chapters ===
- Budianta, Melani (2003). "The Blessed Tragedy: The Making of Women's Activism during the Reformasi Years". In Heryanto, Ariel; Mandal, Sumit K. (eds.). Challenging Authoritarianism in Southeast Asia: Comparing Indonesia and Malaysia. London: Routledge Taylor & Francis Group. pp. 145–176. doi:10.4324/9780203208007. ISBN 978-1-134-39225-4.
- Budianta, Melani (2007). "The Dragon Dance: Shifting Meanings of Chineseness in Indonesia". In Robinson, K. (ed.). Asian and Pacific Cosmopolitans. London: Palgrave Macmillan. pp. 169–189. doi:10.1057/9780230592049_9. ISBN 978-0-230-59204-9.
- Budianta, Melani (2007). "Diverse Voices: Indonesian Literature and Nation-Building". In Hock, Guan Lee; Suryadinata, Leo (eds.). Language, Nation and Development in Southeast Asia. Singapore: ISEAS. pp. 51–73. doi:10.1355/9789812304834-008. ISBN 978-981-230-483-4.

=== Journal articles ===
- Budianta, Melani (2000). "Discourse of Cultural Identity in Indonesia during the 1997–1998 Monetary Crisis". Inter-Asia Cultural Studies. 1: 109–128. doi:10.1080/146493700361033.
- Budianta, Melani (2003). "Plural Identities: Indonesian Women's Redefinition of Democracy in the post-Reformasi Era". RIMA: Review of Indonesian and Malaysian Affairs. 36 (1): 35–50.
- Budianta, Melani (2006). "Decentralizing Engagements: Women and the Democratization Process in Indonesia". Signs: Journal of Women in Culture and Society. 31 (4): 915–923. doi:10.1086/504338.

== Works cited ==
- "Alumni & Voices: Melani Budianta". American Indonesian Exchange Foundation. 8 February 2022. Archived from the original on 10 June 2024.
- Budianta, Melani (2012). "Malang Mignon: Cultural Expressions of the Chinese, 1940–1960". In Lindsay, Jennifer; Liem, Maya H.T. (eds.). Heirs to World Culture: Being Indonesian 1950–1965. Verhandelingen van het Koninklijk Instituut voor Taal-, Land-, en Volkenkunde. Vol. 274. Leiden: KITLV Press. pp. 255–282. doi:10.26530/OAPEN_403204. hdl:20.500.12657/34574. ISBN 978-90-6718-379-6.
- "BRIN and LPDP Hold Sarwono Award and Sarwono Memorial Lecture 2023". National Research and Innovation Agency. 2023. Archived from the original on 19 June 2024.
- Dawis, Aimee (2012). "Budianta, Melani". In Suryadinata, Leo (ed.). Southeast Asian Personalities of Chinese Descent: A Biographical Dictionary. Institute of Southeast Asian Studies. pp. 40–42. ISBN 978-981-4345-21-7.
- Deana, Nafisa (15 September 2023). "Melani Budianta, Guru Besar yang Selalu Ingin Menjadi Guru Kecil (Bagian 2)" [Melani Budianta, A Professor who Always Desired to be a Teacher (Part 2)]. KBR (in Indonesian). Archived from the original on 19 June 2024.
- Hartiningsih, Maria; Pambudy, Ninuk M (4 February 2006). "Persona: Melani Budianta Mendobrak Batas-batas" [People: Melani Budianta, Breaking Barriers]. Kompas (in Indonesian). p. 12.
- Hernitaningtyas, Keshie (4 May 2018). "Literature Plays Crucial Role as Indonesia Enters 20th Year of Reformation". The Jakarta Post. Archived from the original on 24 October 2020.
- "Melani Budianta" (in Indonesian). Ministry of Education and Culture. 8 February 2022. Archived from the original on 27 September 2023.
- "Melani Budianta, Hikmah Perkelahian Sastra" [Melani Budianta, the Blessings of Literary Struggle]. Kompas (in Indonesian). 23 September 1996. p. 24.
- Pandu, Pradipta (24 August 2023). "Melani Budianta, Melihat Kemajemukan lewat Sastra" [Melani Budianta, Observing Diversity through Literature]. Kompas (in Indonesian). Archived from the original on 19 June 2024.
- Purwantari, BI (17 November 2006). "Melani Budianta: Dikelilingi oleh Buku" [Melani Budianta: Surrounded by Books]. Kompas (in Indonesian). p. 42.
