= Formalism (literature) =

School of literary criticism and theory

Formalism is a school of literary criticism and literary theory having mainly to do with structural purposes of a particular text. It is the study of a text without taking into account any outside influence. Formalism rejects or sometimes simply brackets (i.e., ignores for the purpose of analysis) notions of culture or societal influence, authorship and content, but instead focuses on modes, genres, discourse, and forms.

== In literary theory ==
In literary theory, formalism refers to critical approaches that analyze, interpret, or evaluate the inherent features of a text. These features include not only grammar and syntax but also literary devices such as meter and tropes. The formalist approach reduces the importance of a text's historical, biographical, and cultural context.

Formalism rose to prominence in the early twentieth century as a reaction against Romanticist theories of literature, which centered on the artist and individual creative genius, once again placing the text itself in the spotlight to show how the text was indebted to forms and other works that had preceded it. Two schools of formalist literary criticism developed, Russian formalism, and soon after Anglo-American New Criticism. Formalism was the dominant mode of academic literary study in the US at least from the end of the Second World War through the 1970s, especially as embodied in René Wellek and Austin Warren's Theory of Literature (1948, 1955, 1962).

Beginning in the late 1970s, formalism was substantially displaced by various approaches (often with political aims or assumptions) that were suspicious of the idea that a literary work could be separated from its origins or uses. The term has often had a pejorative cast and has been used by opponents to indicate either aridity or ideological deviance. Some recent trends in academic literary criticism suggest that formalism may be making a comeback.

== Pedagogy ==
William H. Thelin criticizes Maxine Hairston's approach to teaching composition from a current-traditional standpoint, which she then mixes with the political. He claims that “No matter how sound the politics … the student would have no choice but to regurgitate that dogma in the clearest terms possible and to shift concentration onto matters of structure and correctness”.

Mary Ann Cain writes that “formalism asserts that the text stands on its own as a complete entity, apart from the writer who produced it”. Moreover, Cain says that “one can regard textual products as teachable and still maintain that being a writer is a "natural" act, one not subject to instruction. Composition, like creative writing, has flourished under the assumption that students are already writers, or have the capacity to learn-and that everyone should be writers. Yet the questions composition tends to pose within this assumption are not so much about which aspects of writing can or cannot be taught, but how writing can be taught and under what conditions. In regards to formalist composition, one must ask, “to what extent is this ‘need’ for ‘academic discourse’ real – any more than the need for more ‘imaginative writing’ is real-except to perform some function, to get something done?”.

== Research ==
Formalism research involves studying the ways in which students present their writing. Some ways formalism research is conducted involves allowing the text to speak to the readers versus cutting out unintended meaning in a written piece. Respectively, these two methods deal with language as the “master” writer versus a teacher as the “master” writer.

=== Russian formalism ===
Russian Formalism refers to the work of the Society for the Study of Poetic Language (OPOYAZ) founded in 1916 in St. Petersburg (then Petrograd) by Boris Eichenbaum, Viktor Shklovsky and Yury Tynyanov, and secondarily to the Moscow Linguistic Circle founded in 1914 by Roman Jakobson. (The folklorist Vladimir Propp is also often associated with the movement.) Eichenbaum's 1926 essay "The Theory of the 'Formal Method'" (translated in Lemon and Reis) provides an economical overview of the approach the Formalists advocated, which included the following basic ideas:

- The aim is to produce "a science of literature that would be both independent and factual," which is sometimes designated by the term poetics.
- Since literature is made of language, linguistics will be a foundational element of the science of literature.
- Literature is autonomous from external conditions in the sense that literary language is distinct from ordinary uses of language, not least because it is not (entirely) communicative.
- Literature has its own history, a history of innovation in formal structures, and is not determined (as some crude versions of Marxism have it) by external, material history.
- What a work of literature says cannot be separated from how the literary work says it, and therefore the form of a work, far from being merely the decorative wrapping of an isolable content, is in fact part of the content of the work.

According to Eichenbaum, Shklovsky was the lead critic of the group, and Shklovsky contributed two of their most well-known concepts: defamiliarization (ostraneniye, more literally, 'estrangement') and the plot/story distinction (syuzhet/fabula). "Defamiliarization" is one of the crucial ways in which literary language distinguishes itself from ordinary, communicative language, and is a feature of how art in general works, namely by presenting the world in a strange and new way that allows us to see things differently. Innovation in literary history is, according to Shklovsky, partly a matter of finding new techniques of defamiliarization. The plot/story distinction separates out the sequence of events the work relates (the story) from the sequence in which those events are presented in the work (the plot). Both of these concepts are attempts to describe the significance of the form of a literary work in order to define its "literariness." For the Russian Formalists as a whole, form is what makes something art to begin with, so in order to understand a work of art as a work of art (rather than as an ornamented communicative act) one must focus on its form.

This emphasis on form, seemingly at the expense of thematic content, was not well-received after the Russian Revolution of 1917. One of the most sophisticated critiques of the Formalist project was Leon Trotsky's Literature and Revolution (1924). Trotsky does not wholly dismiss the Formalist approach, but insists that "the methods of formal analysis are necessary, but insufficient" because they neglect the social world with which the human beings who write and read literature are bound up: "The form of art is, to a certain and very large degree, independent, but the artist who creates this form, and the spectator who is enjoying it, are not empty machines, one for creating form and the other for appreciating it. They are living people, with a crystallized psychology representing a certain unity, even if not entirely harmonious. This psychology is the result of social conditions" (180, 171). The Formalists were thus accused of being politically reactionary because of such unpatriotic remarks as Shklovsky's (quoted by Trotsky) that "Art was always free of life, and its color never reflected the color of the flag which waved over the fortress of the City"(source?)(164). The leaders of the movement suffered political persecution beginning in the 1920s, when Joseph Stalin came to power, which largely put an end to their inquiries. But their ideas continued to influence subsequent thinkers, partly due to Tzvetan Todorov's translations of their works in the 1960s and 1970s, including Todorov himself, Barthes, Genette and Jauss.

== The Prague Circle and structuralism ==
The Moscow Linguistic Circle founded by Jakobson was more directly concerned with recent developments in linguistics than Eichenbaum's group. Jakobson left Moscow for Prague in 1920 and in 1926 co-founded the Prague Linguistic Circle, which embodied similar interests, especially in the work of Ferdinand de Saussure.

== See also ==
- I. A. Richards
- New Criticism
- Stylistics (linguistics)
