= Soeman Hs Library =

Library in Pekanbaru, Riau, Indonesia

- Perpustakaan Soeman Hs Provinsi Riau
- The Soeman Hs Library at Cut Nyak Dien Street
- 0.5158418540480119°N 101.44714357025708°E
- Location: Pekanbaru, Riau, Indonesia
- Type: National library

Collection

Other information
- Website: http://mediacenter.riau.go.id/

Soeman Hs Library is a library and national archive in Riau Province, Indonesia. It was named for the author Soeman Hs.

The library was built by the government of Riau Province with six floors. The library has a number of facilities including an auditorium, cubicles of Malay culture, an atrium, meeting room, Internet room, small mosque, café, cafeteria and Energy Corner (Chevron Library).

The Library Soeman Hs also keeps a number of works of literature related to Malay culture, stored in a special room known as the Malay Chambers.

In 2008, Vice President Muhammad Jusuf Kalla came to review and inaugurated the Soeman Hs Library.

In addition to being a reading room, the library is a public space for the community.

The design is inspired from open books.

On 26 February 2015, Soeman HS Library was named as the best library in Southeast Asia.

== See also ==
- List of libraries in Indonesia
