= Theory of Literature =

Book by René Wellek and Austin Warren

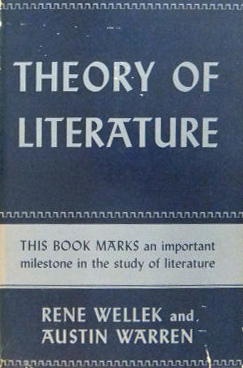
- Dust jacket, first edition
- Author: René Wellek; Austin Warren
- Language: English
- Subject: Literary scholarship
- Publisher: Harcourt, Brace, and Company
- Publication date: 1948; 1942, 1946, 1949 (imprint)
- Publication place: United States
- Media type: Hardcover
- Pages: 403
- OCLC: 1599846

Theory of Literature is a book on literary scholarship by René Wellek, of the structuralist Prague school, and Austin Warren, a self-described "old New Critic". The two met at the University of Iowa in the late 1930s, and by 1940 had begun writing the book; they wrote collaboratively, in a single voice over a period of three years. Its contents were based on their shared understandings of literature.

Originally consisting of twenty chapters – one was cut in later editions – Theory of Literature describes various aspects of literary theory, criticism, and history. After defining various aspects and relationships of literature in general, Wellek and Warren divide analysis of literature based on two approaches: extrinsic, relating to factors outside a work such as the author and society, and intrinsic, relating to factors within such as rhythm and meter. They stress the need to focus on the intrinsic elements of a work as the best way to truly understand it. In doing so they adapt the phenomenology used by Roman Ingarden.

Published by Harcourt, Brace, and Company in December 1948, Theory of Literature received mixed reviews from the academic community. It was used to teach literary theory beginning soon after publication and remained in common use into the 1960s. Its success has been credited as introducing European literary scholarship into the United States and crystallizing a movement towards intrinsic literary criticism. Theory of Literature saw three editions and has been translated into more than twenty languages.

== Background ==
René Wellek (1903–1995) was an Austrian-born scholar from the structuralist Prague school of linguistics, studying under Vilém Mathesius. Wellek had training in classical literature and was fluent in several European languages, both Romance and Slavic. His theoretical training included the phenomenology of Edmund Husserl, as used in Roman Ingarden's work, and the psychologically influenced linguistics of Karl Bühler. After Nazi Germany occupied Prague in 1939, Wellek fled London – where he had been teaching – for the United States, finding a position at the University of Iowa under Norman Foerster.

There Wellek met Austin Warren (1899–1986), an American literary scholar who considered himself an "old New Critic". He had written extensively on literary criticism and was raised in, but later saw several limitations to, the New Humanist views promoted by Irving Babbitt and Paul Elmer More. Wellek and Warren were soon in agreement over several aspects of literature, and by 1940 they had begun considering collaboration on a book. Over the next several years they furthered their understandings of European and American literature theory through discussions with Cleanth Brooks and Robert Penn Warren, as well as extensive reading of contemporary European writings.

== Writing ==
Owing to several academic commitments, work on Theory of Literature did not begin until 1945, after Wellek and Warren received a stipend from the Rockefeller Foundation over a period of two summers. Wellek and Warren began dividing their responsibilities, at first evenly, but with more work done by Wellek as Warren dealt with the illness, and later loss, of his wife Eleanor in 1946. During this period of writing Wellek transferred to Yale University (1946) and Warren to the University of Michigan (1948), but collaboration continued.

The title, according to Wellek and Warren, was "more than ordinarily difficult" to choose. Some titles, such as Theory of Literature and Methodology of Literary Study, were dismissed as too cumbersome. However, in a 1950 review for The Antioch Review, the literary scholar Herbert S. Benjamin wrote that a better title would have been Theory of the Methodology of the Literary Study; he considered the book lacking the theory implied by the chosen title.

The original publication of Theory of Literature consists of twenty chapters set in five sections based on thematic similarities; one chapter and section was removed in later editions. Wellek contributed thirteen of the book's chapters, while Warren wrote six; the final chapter was written collaboratively. Although most of the chapters are credited as the work of one man, the two often copyedited and proofread each other's work, at times inserting entire sentences or paragraphs. Each also suggested further references that the other could use in expanding his chapter.

In their writing Wellek and Warren attempted to present a single voice despite the dominance of individuals. Their success in presenting such a voice has been debated. Wellek later recalled that people often told him it was difficult to tell who had written which chapter without consulting the book's introduction. However, the literary scholar C. J. van Rees of Tilburg University notes that Wellek's influences are prevalent in chapters authored by Warren. Aldo Scaglione, in a review of the second edition, wrote that "one immediately senses the change of hand" between chapters by different authors.

== Contents ==
=== Section 1: Definitions and Distinctions. ===
The first section, entitled Definitions and Distinctions, consists of five chapters and details how Wellek and Warren define literature. This section also contrasts Wellek and Warren's definition with those of others, such views of literature as everything in print and as only belles-lettres (accepted literary canon). They define literary scholarship as beyond the personal ("super-personal") and contrasted with the literary arts by its more scientific approach. Wellek and Warren suggest that neither a purely objective nor a purely subjective approach would be able to properly describe literature. They note that literary scholarship should not only examine what makes a work or author unique, but also its general characteristics that allow it to be compared to other works.

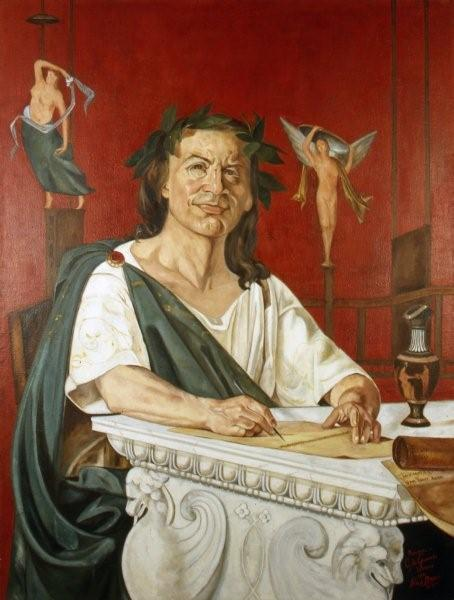
Wellek and Warren begin their discussion of the function of literature with Horace's proclamation that works should be "sweet and useful" (dulce et utile).

Wellek and Warren limit their definition of literature to pieces of "imaginative literature", which can gain artistic merit from their coherence and complexity. The language in literary works is contrasted from scientific and everyday language by the use of connotative (non-literal) language and expressive content. Studies of literature must be literary and systematic, treating literature as literature and not part of another field. Wellek and Warren discuss several proposed functions of literature, beginning with Horace's proclamation that literature must be "sweet and useful" (dulce et utile; have a coalescing aesthetic and functional role), and extending to literature as a substitute for travel and experience, a vehicle for truth or persuasion, to relieve or incite emotion, or as something without a function. They ultimately describe the main function of literature as being loyal to its own nature.

They call for a systematic and integrated study of literature, uniting literary theory, which outlines the basic principles of literature; criticism, which critiques individual works; and history, which outlines the development of literature. Although these aspects have clear distinctions, they are in a dialectical relationship and should not be separated; for example, a theory of literature is impossible without referring to works of literature. They reject Historicist approaches to literary history, which they find reduce literary history to "a series of discrete and hence finally incomprehensible fragments" and emphasize the author's intent too greatly. Instead, Wellek and Warren argue that a work must be seen from the point of view of both its own period and all subsequent periods, as a work's historical meaning is derived from "the history of its criticism by its many readers in many ages." Criticism should not be limited to classical and medieval literature, but also include works by living authors.

Wellek and Warren describe the term comparative literature as "troublesome", noting that it has been used for the study of oral literature, the study of the literatures in two or more countries, and the study of a "general", "universal", or "world" literature; this last use, according to the authors, obviates issues present in the other understandings of the term. This understanding of literature as a totality can be used to trace the development of the art, unlimited by differences between languages. Within this comparative literature other supernational literatures, which may be based on language families and schools, are also apparent. There are also national literatures which, although possibly of the same language, will still have thematic differentiations. These are also worthy of study.

In describing the treatment of manuscripts, Wellek and Warren often cite research into the works of William Shakespeare.

=== Section 2: Preliminary Operations ===
This section consists of a single chapter regarding the treatment, classification, annotation, and other aspects of working with manuscripts and related documentation. Wellek and Warren describe tasks such as authenticating manuscripts and establishing an author and date as important ones without which "critical analysis and historical understanding would be hopelessly handicapped"; however, these tasks should be preliminary to the "ultimate task of scholarship", analysis, and not a goal in themselves. Wellek and Warren note the importance of identifying forgeries, a task which can be completed in numerous ways: paleography, bibliography, linguistics, and history may all be involved. These forgeries may spark further investigation and literary debates which can result in a better understanding of the period, the writer, or the writer's oevre.

The authors identify two levels of operations when dealing with manuscripts: the assembly and preparation of the materials, and the establishment of aspects such as chronology and authorship. At the first level one must locate and identify materials to study, be they written, printed, or oral; such a task may be difficult and depend on factors outside literature in its completion. Written and printed works must then be edited for readability; this task, which requires "lucky guesswork", entails deciphering illegible parts in the material, classifying it, and identifying possible changes made by scribes (and thus bringing the material closer to its "author's own"). Meanwhile, the second level may require greater initiative from the one studying a work; it involves, among other things, selection of what should be published, how it is best arranged in a collection, the establishment of chronology and authorship through internal and external evidence, and the provision of proper annotation and commentary.

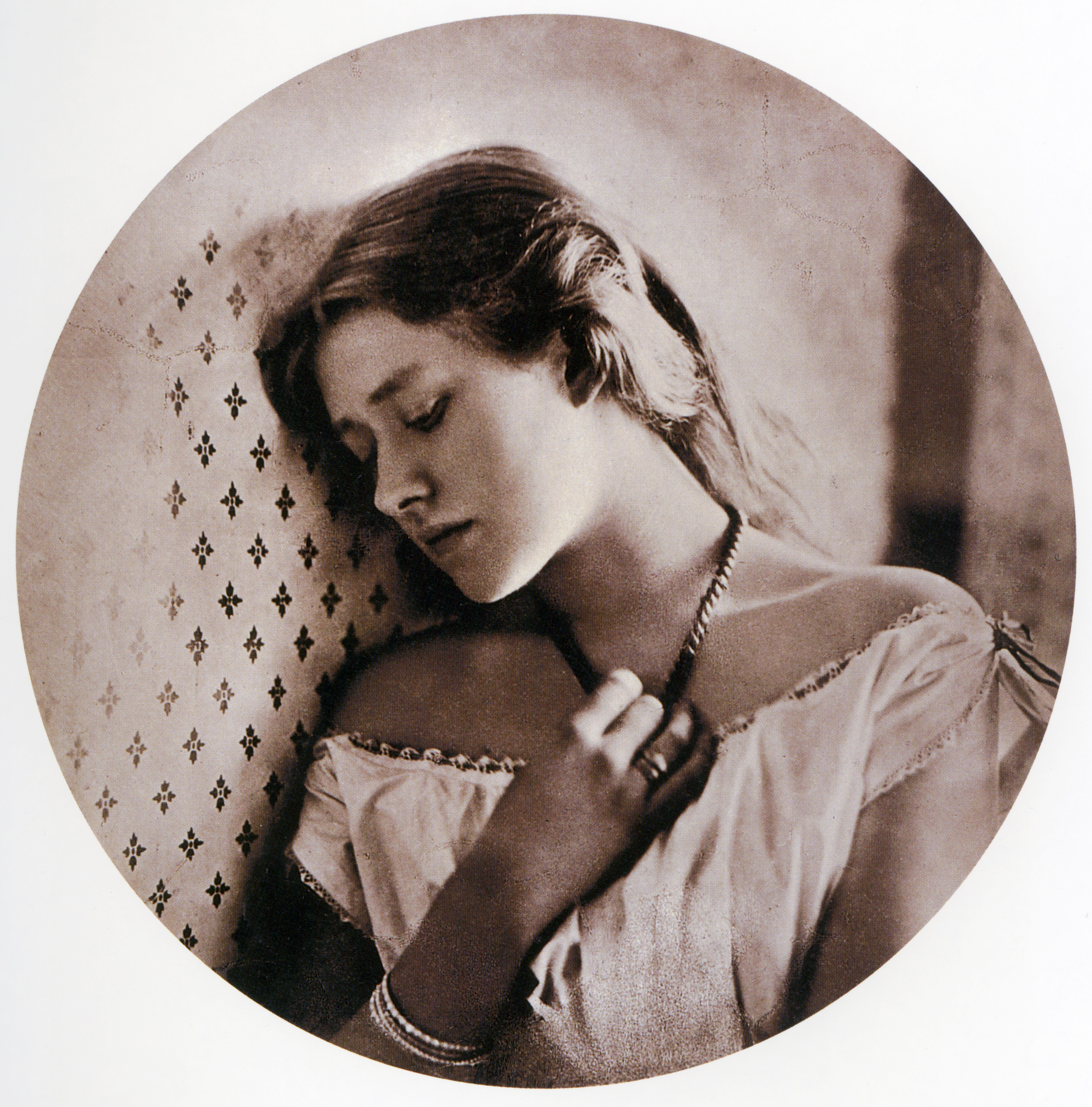
In discussing how literature does not necessarily reflect an author's experiences, Wellek and Warren quote the actress Ellen Terry: if Shakespeare wrote only what he knew, he "must have been a woman".

=== Section 3: The Extrinsic Approach to the Study of Literature ===
The third section consists of five chapters discussing various elements extrinsic to works of literature, such as biography, psychology, social milieu, ideas, and other arts; this is opposed to elements intrinsic to a work, which are explored in Section 4. They write that research into extrinsic elements often results in an attempt to establish some causality between the extrinsic elements and a work. Although "[n]obody can deny that much light has been thrown on literature by a proper knowledge of the conditions under which it has been produced", such studies "can never dispose of problems of description, analysis, and evaluation of an object such as a work of literary art."

Wellek and Warren describe three views of a biographical approach, of which only one – the biographical aspects relating to the production of a work – can be of use; this use, however, is limited. They reject the views that works accurately reflect the author's life or that the author's life must be understood in order to understand a particular work. According to Wellek and Warren, works may indeed reflect the author's experiences, but they may also reflect an author's hopes and dreams, or literary tradition and convention, and as such are "not a document for biography". Likewise, an understanding of personal style (what makes a work "Miltonic", "Keatsian", "Shakespearean", or "Virgilian") does not rely on knowledge of the author's life. They conclude that "it seems dangerous to ascribe to [biography] any real critical importance", and that such approaches, if undertaken at all, should be done with a "sense" of the distinctions outlined above.

Wellek and Warren consider analysis of characters the only legitimate application of psychological analysis in literary study. Such an analysis, however, they find lacking on its own merits: individual characters do not fit psychological theories of the time they are written. Works which are true to certain psychological theories, meanwhile, are not necessarily better. Thus, they question the value of looking for psychological "truth" in how a work is presented. Additionally they outline and critique psychological theories that have been used to analyze authors and the creative process.

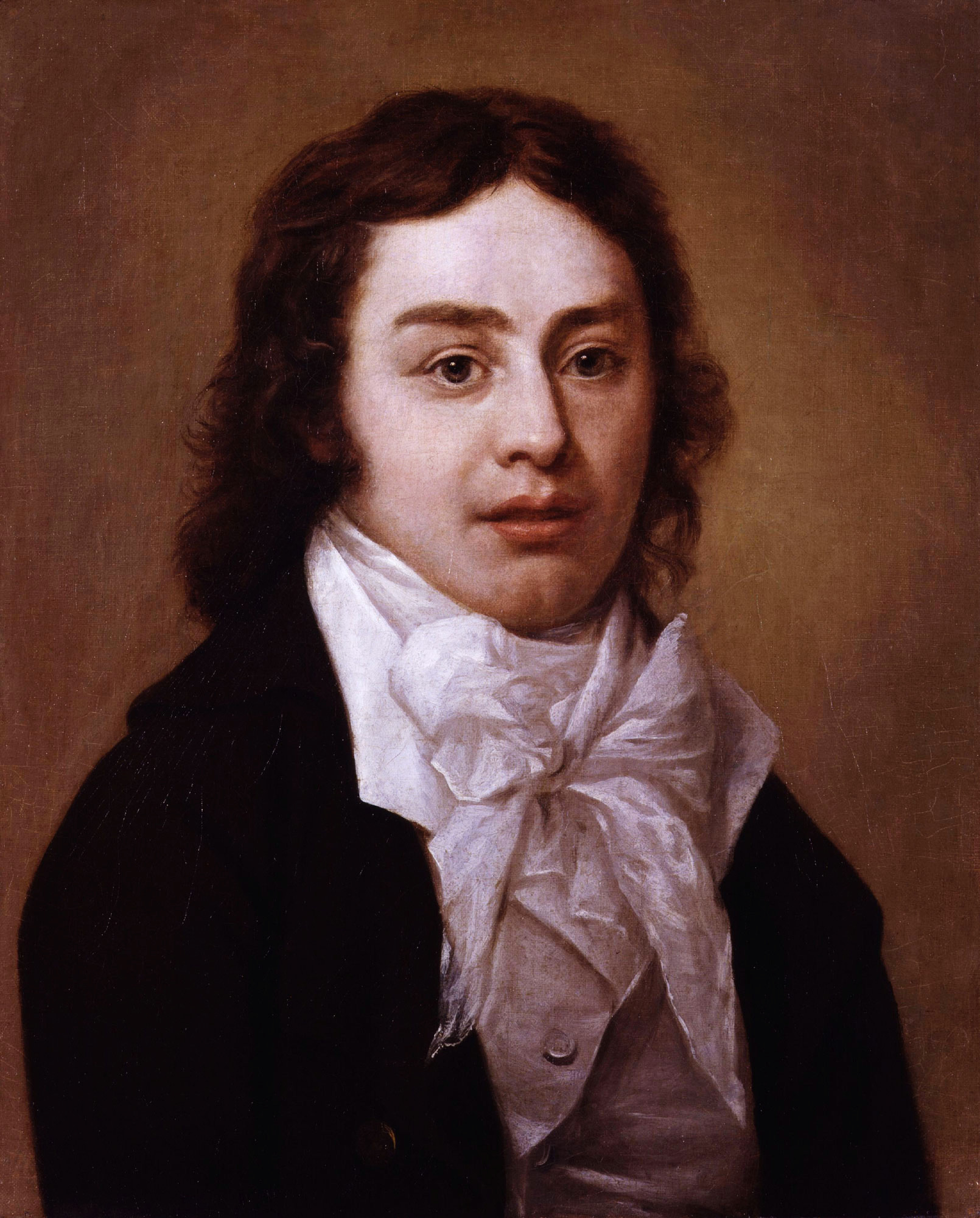
Wellek and Warren note that Coleridge's work helped bring Neoplatonistic views to England.

Wellek and Warren write that literature is ultimately a social institution as several aspects of it are created or influenced through social conventions and norms. They reject a more specific understanding of social realities in literature. An author, for example, is a social being, raised and shaped by society and is in a dialectic relationship with the audience: the audience provides recognition and an income, and the author shapes audiences' tastes and behavior. Intrinsic elements of the work, and indeed the "realization of certain aesthetic values", can reflect contemporary society and its attitudes. Literature does not, however, "correctly" reflect society or life, and may exhibit little connection. As such, "social truth" should not become an artistic value of its own right, and literature should not be thought of as a "substitute for sociology or politics".

Wellek and Warren note arguments that literature is a form of philosophy or, alternatively, that it is devoid of such ideas. They reject extreme versions of these arguments. They write that "a knowledge of the history of philosophy and of general ideas" will be valuable for a researcher. However, they note that philosophical ideas may not have been consciously included in a work. Instead, they agree with the German scholar Rudolf Unger that "literature expresses a general attitude toward life, that poets usually answer, unsystematically, questions which are also themes of philosophy", in a manner that differs over time. They outline attempts at classifying these ideas, including through Weltanschauung ("world view") and Geistesgeschichte ("time spirit"), before showing shortcomings in these systems. They then write that students of literature, an art which may (but need not) parallel philosophical development, should focus on how ideas enter the work. Wellek and Warren argue that a work does not necessarily become better with more philosophical content.

Wellek and Warren write that the relationship between literature and other forms of art, such as architecture, sculpture, music, or visual art, is "highly various and complex". For example, literature may inspire the other art forms, or vice versa. A work of literature may also attempt to have the same effect as another art, through visualization, musicality, or other techniques. However, literature remains a separate art form, and effects found within are conveyed imperfectly. The emotions triggered by a work, or the intentions or theories behind it, will likewise not completely parallel those of another art form; individual forms of art have also "evolved" differently. Instead, Wellek and Warren suggest that works of art, like literature, can only be truly understood by looking at the works of art themselves and not their extrinsic aspects. A comparison between literature and another art form, thus, is secondary to establishing "outlines of strictly literary evolution".

=== Section 4: The Intrinsic Study of Literature ===
This section, almost twice the size of the others, consists of eight chapters regarding various elements intrinsic to works of literature. Wellek and Warren write that starting an analysis from elements intrinsic to the work is "natural and sensible", given that "only the works themselves justify all our interest" in extrinsic issues. They outline different definitions of literature, including as artifacts, sequences of sounds pronounced when reading, the experiences of the reader or author, or the "sum of all past and possible experiences" (alternatively "the experience common to all the experiences") related to a work. All these understandings they find lacking. Instead they suggest that literature is a "potential cause of experiences" consisting of a system of stratified norms – implicit in the work – which can only be partially realized by the reader; it is neither purely material, mental, nor ideal, nor is it static or bereft of value.

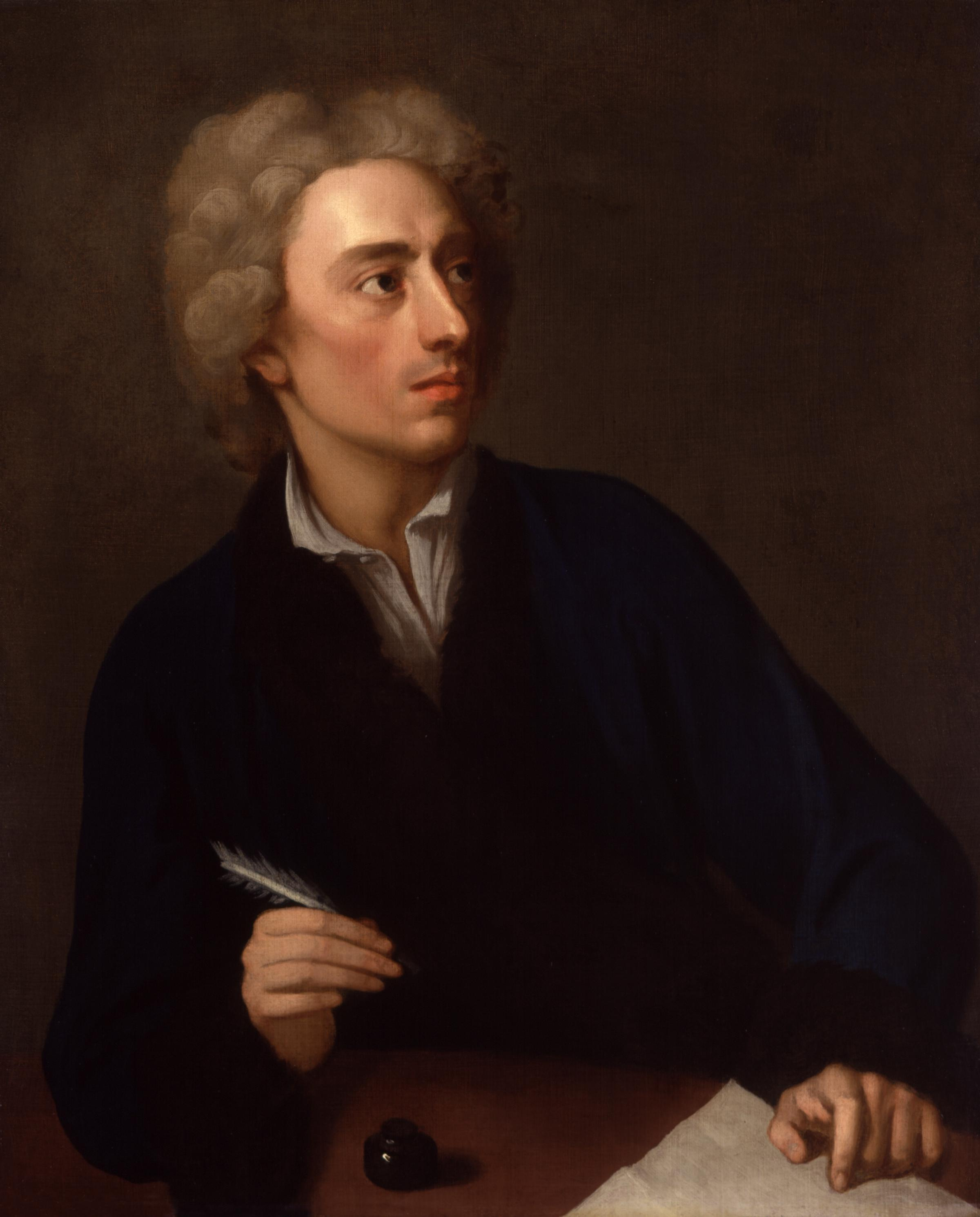
Among the works Wellek and Warren quote when discussing meter is Alexander Pope's An Essay on Man.

Wellek and Warren consider patterns of sound as inherent to the text; these must be analyzed while keeping the meaning (or general emotional tone) in mind. They suggest two different aspects of sound systems: sounds in isolation, and sounds in relations with others. The sounds in isolation are used in a work establish a euphony or orchestration – a sound aesthetic which may be pleasing or harsh – while the relational aspect "may become the basis of rhythm and meter". Regarding euphony, Wellek and Warren discuss issues of classification, rhyme, onomotopeia, and the "physiognomy" of sounds as part of orchestration. Of rhythm they explore varying definitions, applications, typology, and artistic value. They then discuss theories of meter and their shortcomings, noting that the metric foundation differs between languages and stressing that meaning should not be divorced from meter.

Language, meanwhile, they describe as "quite literally the material of the literary artist"; although a work is influenced by language, the writer's style, the use of communicative language, may influence language. Rather than use a work to study linguistic history, they recommend examining works through stylistics, which in literature they define as "the study of a work of art or a group of works which are to be described in terms of their aesthetic function and meaning". Such studies can be done either as a search for a "total meaning" or a "sum of individual traits". Ideally, such a study should "establish some unifying principle, some general aesthetic" in a work or genre, although some may be more difficult than others. As such, they reject stylistic studies which focus mainly on "peculiarities of style" or which are linked to extrinsic elements.

For other understandings of meaning, Wellek and Warren suggest a look at the sequence of image, metaphor, symbol, and myth, which they consider making up the "central poetic structure" of a work. In turns, they outline various historical definitions of the terms – which at times overlap – before writing that most of these theories have treated the sequence as "detachable parts of the works in which they appear." This Wellek and Warren refuse, instead arguing that "the meaning and function of literature [i]s centrally present in metaphor and myth". They show that the dominant form of figurative language shifts over time before overviewing two diverging typologies of metaphor, that of Henry W. Wells and Hermann Pongs. They finally discuss several aspects of "practical criticism" based on poetic language and its underlying assumptions. They reject approaches which attempt to understand the author through his or her words or which attempt to understand figurative language alone; instead, it should be studied not in isolation but as "an element in the totality, the integrity, of the literary work".

After reiterating their views of the relationship between reality and literature, Wellek and Warren write that narrative fiction takes place in its own "worlds", consisting of five codeterminant elements: narrative structure, characters, setting, world-view, and tone. The latter two are discussed in the following chapter. They define the narrative structure as built around a pattern of dialog and description, and various concepts related to narrative; these include time within a work, narrative points of view and voices, major types, plot, devices, and pacing. This is followed by a discussion of characterization, involving modes, types, and typologies, then setting (the environment in a work). This world can serve as a basis for analysis and judgment of a work. Although they focus on the "world" in narrative fiction, drama shares similar aspects.

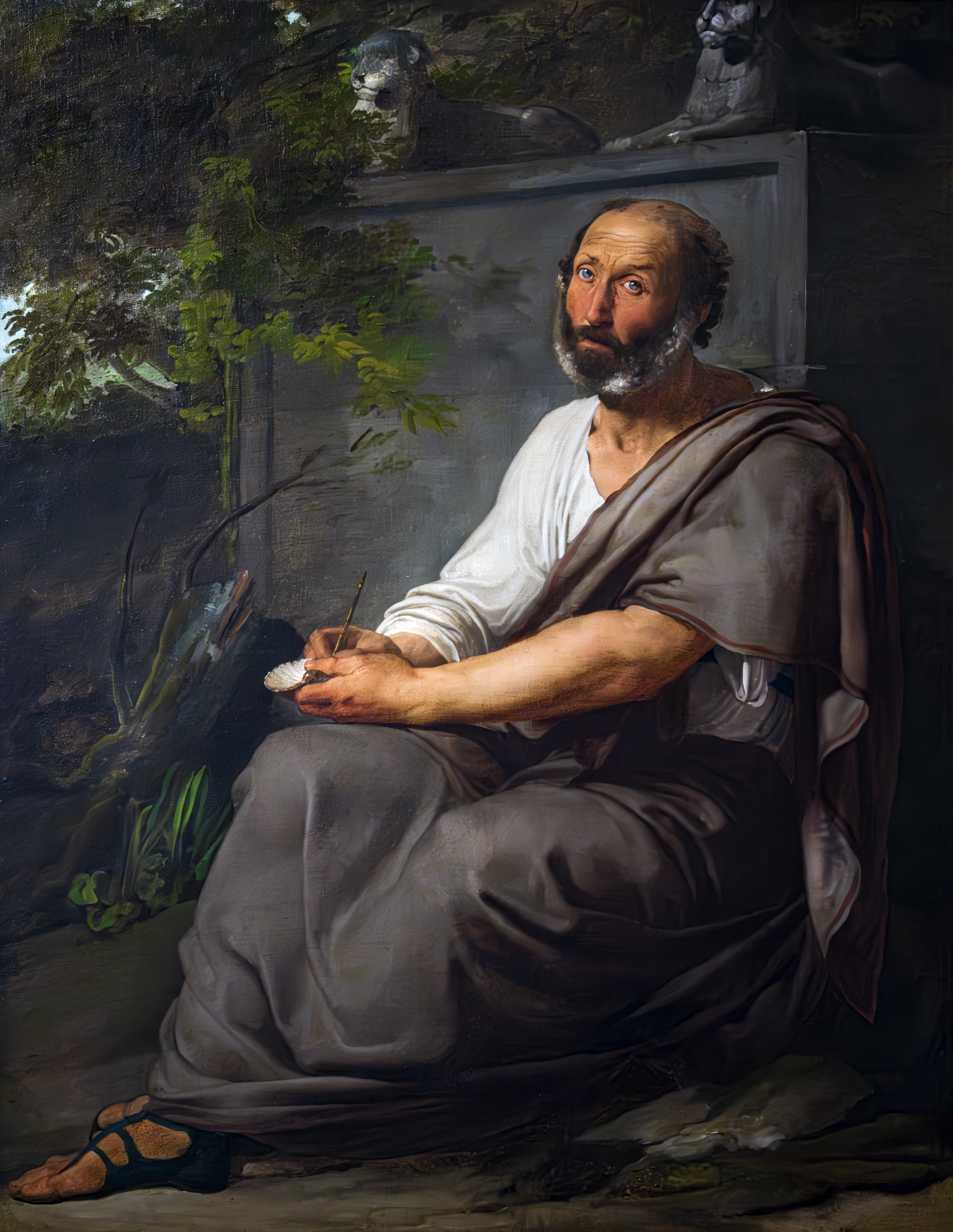
Wellek and Warren proscribe a more specific understanding of genre than Aristotle's poetry, prose, and drama.

Wellek and Warren consider genres as influencing "any critical and evaluative ... study". All works of literature can be so classified, although the genres themselves are (presumably) not fixed. After outlining a brief history of the "ultimate" genres as understood by Aristotle (poetry, prose, and drama), they show such an understanding as "scarcely promising of objective results" and overly prescriptive; they also reject several alternative theories of genre. Instead, they suggest that genres should be understood descriptively, as based on the "outer form" (meter, structure) and the "inner form" (attitude, tone, purpose), with the "outer form" emphasized. Wellek and Warren consider genres to be continually shifting, with good writers conforming to but ultimately expanding them.

According to Wellek and Warren, evaluation of literary work should be done based on the work's own nature, divorced from an author's practical or scientific intent. They reject evaluation based on extra-literary content, writing instead that literature – like all fine art – will provide an "aesthetic experience" which can be judged. They note various criteria used to identify "good" literature, rejecting Russian formalism's criterion of defamiliarization and similar understandings for one based on the diversity of materials amalgamated within a work. They reject a static hierarchy or generationalist understanding of literary greats. Instead, they suggest that every work's rank changes when a new work is introduced and that values within are "really, or potentially, present in the art object". They note a dialectic relationship between evaluating and critically analyzing literature. This ties genre theory to the history of literature.

Wellek and Warren – disapproving of contemporary histories of literature – opine that a history of literature is possible and should be based on elements intrinsic to works. Such a history should describe the development of "[t]he process of interpretation, criticism, and appreciation" or trace the development of works in small and large groups before tying it to universal literature. This "historical evolution" of related yet individual events they tie to "variable schemes of values" which must be "abstracted from history itself." They suggest numerous ways in which this can be accomplished, including identifying the development of values, traits, forms, themes, and motifs. Periodization, they write, should not be based on chronological boundaries, but a "time section dominated by a system of literary norms, standards, and conventions, whose introduction, spread, diversification, integration, and disappearance can be traced" which must be extracted from history, with boundaries marked by both internal and external changes. They close the chapter by stating that existing methods are "clumsy" and that a new ideal and methods of literary history is necessary.

=== Section 5: The Academic Situation ===
The final section of the book, removed in later editions, consists of a single chapter regarding the study of literature. Wellek and Warren bemoan that literary students are "offered no wider choice than between the 'historical method' ... and dilettantism", supporting instead a critically oriented literary scholarship. After finding faults with the literary scholarship in England, Germany, France, and Russia, Wellek and Warren suggest that the US is poised to start a new era in scholarship. They note that this opportunity may, however, be lost in a conflict between those advocating change and the inertia (including persons defending the status quo) in American literary studies and institutions.

Rather than maintain the system of having scholars specialized in certain time periods and authors, Wellek and Warren push for scholars who have mastered certain approaches and thought patterns, preferably those who are from a literary background. They also recommend "sharper distinction between the teacher and the scholar", allowing some individuals to devote their careers to research and not teaching. They emphasize a need for fluency in several modern languages rather than an understanding of the classical ones; this coincides with their urge to establish departments teaching comparative literature. They recommend the teaching of literary methods and theories in combination with periods and authors, with a retooling of the doctoral dissertation procedures.

== Theoretical borrowings ==
Theory of Literature was influenced by Russian formalism, a school of thought which sought to examine literature (or, more precisely, what formalist-turned-structuralist Roman Jakobson termed literariness) as an autonomous body, and the American New Criticism, which likewise denied external influences. The book borrowed formalism's concepts of an aesthetic function and dominance of different elements of language. Unlike Russian formalism, however, Wellek and Warren's theory recognized the possibility of factors outside the work being studied, although Wellek and Warren continued to emphasize aspects within the work itself. Also unlike their forerunners, Wellek and Warren saw aesthetic value as not the defamiliarization of the mundane, but an interaction among the strata derived from Roman Ingarden's work: the phonological (sound) level at the base, then semantic (meaning), and the "world" created by literature. This last strata they divided into paradigms and "metaphysical qualities", the level which a reader contemplates. They did not, however, accept Ingarden's teachings as a whole, writing that Ingarden "analyze[d] the work of art without reference to values", a system which they found untenable.

Wellek and Warren's concept of aesthetics borrowed from the writings of Immanuel Kant, implying that a specific "aesthetic realm" was autonomous within the work and required a certain perspective to properly understand; they emphasize this with a quote from the neo-Kantian philosopher and literary critic Eliseo Vivas, that beauty is a "character of some things ... present only in the thing for those endowed with the capacity and the training through which alone it can be perceived". Meanwhile, their depiction of a dynamic scale of values, as opposed to an anarchical one, is a reimagining of perspectivism, which Wellek and Warren define as "recogniz[ing] that there is one poetry, one literature, comparable in all ages, developing, changing, full of possibilities". They explicitly denounce absolutism and relativism.

== Publication ==
Theory of Literature was published by Harcourt, Brace, and Company in December 1948, with a copyright notice dated 1942, 1947, and 1949. Wellek notes that 1942, often quoted as a year of publication in Europe, is in fact when his article "The Mode of Existence of a Literary Work of Art" was published in The Southern Review; the article was reused as a chapter of Theory of Literature, leading to the inclusion of the year 1942. Several other works by Wellek and Warren had been adapted for Theory of Literature.

Translations of Theory of Literature began soon after it was published; by 2010 the work had been translated into more than twenty languages, including Spanish, Korean, Hebrew, and Hindi. Two new editions were issued, first in 1956 then in 1962. These new editions included updated bibliographies and clarified points; the last chapter, "Study of Literature in the Graduate School", was removed beginning in the second edition as Wellek and Warren considered the reforms suggested within already accomplished in several places. By 1976 Wellek was of the opinion that the book required updating, but asked rhetorically "who can master the astonishing and bewildering literature on theory which since [1949] has been produced in many countries?" and noted that he and Warren were busy with their own projects.

== Reception ==
Academic reception of Theory of Literature was mixed. The philologist Helmut Hatzfeld, reviewing shortly after the book's release, described Theory of Literature as "radical in its viewpoint, rich in ideas and bibliographical material, poised in its judgment of other approaches to literature" as well as a "landmark in literary studies." Although Hatzfeld agreed with Wellek and Warren's main points, he thought it lacking in references to theories and literature from the Romance languages and concrete interpretations. William Troy, writing in The Hudson Review, echoed the sentiment, stating that, although the book was "unusually difficult" to read, he felt "unqualified agreement with the main position". He expected that the book would not succeed with "anyone ungifted from birth with some susceptibility to ... 'intrinsic' elements", a group which he believed comprised the majority of those teaching literature in the US. Seymour Betsky, writing in Scrutiny, praised the book's summary and adjudication; he wrote that it was "in its way impressive", a "tour de force" which would "usher in a new era". However, Betsky felt that the book lacked a "controlling purpose" and that it neglected to emphasize the need to differentiate between "the cheap commercial appeal and the genuine" literature.

Edward Goodwin Ballard, reviewing for The Journal of Philosophy, found the treatment lacking, with major terms left undefined and much of the book providing synopses of other writers' theories; he conceded, however, that it convincingly showed that "the intellectual study of literature qua literature has just begun". In The Kenyon Review, Vivas wrote that the book's discussion of the relation between literary criticism and scholarship "leaves nothing to be desired", providing a "well balanced" look at the major points; he found that no other such work existed in English at the time. Vivas opined, however, that Wellek and Warren lacked a single, non-contradictory theory to use as a base for their conclusions. Kemp Malone, reviewing for Linguistics, discussed three chapters on elements of literature related to linguistics. He considered these to provide "food for thought" for linguists and suggested that Wellek was well-versed in linguistics for a professor of literature, despite misusing several terms common in the discipline.

Newton Arvin, writing in the Partisan Review, found Theory of Literature to excessively indulge in formalism and expressed concern that the idea of literary history may have "gone into the discard once and for all". Benjamin found the book not something new, but a final assertion of the dominance of New Criticism in literary theory, a dominance which he considered untenable. Rather than emphasize theory, he found that Theory of Literature was "ninety-nine parts a 'good offense' against its slain and buried foes" with "exceptionally lucid and authoritative" discussions of literary problems. Scaglione opined that Theory of Literature's plain, imprecise language had introduced numerous inconsistencies within its theoretical framework; he also stated that the book led readers to believe they were approaching an understanding of literature without ever reaching the core essence of the subject.

Ingarden, who believed his theories the basis of Wellek and Warren's arguments, considered himself inadequately credited and took offense with the attribution of his ideas to "pure phenomenologists". He also stated that they had misrepresented his views. George Grabowicz, prefacing his translation of Ingarden's The Literary Work of Art, suggested that Theory of Literature was "instrumental" in spreading Ingarden's ideas.

== Legacy ==
At the time of publication Wellek and Warren considered Theory of Literature unparalleled in English-language publications, an attempt to unite literary theory, criticism, history, and scholarship. Although they noted a similarity to existing German and Russian works, the authors considered those earlier works "eclectic" and "doctrinaire", respectively. Ballard writes that Theory of Literature was published during a time of increasing focus on the art of literature, rather than its underlying philosophy.

In an academic biography of Wellek, Michael Holquist of Columbia University writes that Theory of Literature established Wellek's reputation as a literary scholar for the next three decades. The book proved to be Wellek's only "book-length scholarly manifesto", a format which Holquist credits to Warren's influence. Wellek's other works were essays on literary theory and criticism which, even though bound in a single volume, did not provide a single coherent manifesto. Wellek would continue to use the theories contained in Theory of Literature into the late 1980s.

The book was used to teach literary theory at universities beginning not long after publication and remained dominant into the mid-1960s, at which time an increasingly heterogeneous academia questioned the universal value of literature; literary theorist Terry Eagleton finds that, after the 1960s, "it was no longer possible to take for granted what literature was, how to read it, or what social functions it might serve". Steven Mailloux describes Theory of Literature as crystallizing an American movement towards intrinsic literary criticism, as dominated by New Criticism, while van Rees credits the book with popularizing a text-oriented interpretation. Grabowicz writes that its importance for both American and general literary studies is "indisputable". Writing in 1987, Jeremy Hawthorn described the book as an "excellent introductory study", despite extrinsic studies having become more dominant in literary criticism, while Holquist found that the book could still "be usefully invoked" in literary debates of the early 21st century. In an obituary of Wellek, Robert Thomas Jr. credited Theory of Literature with "introduc[ing] European scholarship to the United States" and establishing a framework for comparative literature studies in the United States.

The theoretical positions promulgated in Theory of Literature have generally been criticized by later writers. Van Rees, for example, considers Wellek and Warren's distinction between extrinsic and intrinsic aspects of literature to be too sharply drawn, leading to the two aspects becoming binary opposites. Holquist notes that this distinction proceeds from a different understanding of literature. He writes that Wellek's school of thought considered literature as a "unified subject" with definite boundaries which could be mastered, while more recent scholarship has rendered "[t]he very identity of literature as an object of study ... no longer clear."
