= Literariness =

Property which distinguishes literature from ordinary text

In literary theory, literariness is the organisation of language which through special linguistic and formal properties distinguishes literary texts from non-literary texts. The defining features of a literary work do not reside in extraliterary conditions such as history or sociocultural phenomena under which a literary text might have been created, but in the form of the language that is used. Thus, literariness is defined as being the feature that makes a given work a literary work. It distinguishes a literary work from ordinary texts by using certain artistic devices such as metre, rhyme, and other patterns of sound and repetition.

== History ==
The term ‘literariness’ was first introduced by the Russian Formalist Roman Jacobson in 1921. He declared in his work Modern Russian Poetry that ‘the object of literary science is not literature but literariness, i.e. what makes a given work a literary work’. Russian formalism preceded the Russian Revolution as it originated in the second decade of the 20th century and flourished in the 1920s. It had its origin in two centres: the Moscow Linguistics Circle and the St. Petersburg based group OPOJAZ (the Society for the Study of Poetic Language). The focus of their attention was on the analysis of the features that make up literary texts in opposition to the former traditional study of literature which focussed on studying literature in conjunction with other disciplines such as history, biography, sociology and psychology. It insisted that literary scholars should solely be concerned with the component parts of a literary text and should exclude all intuition or imagination. It emphasised that the focus resides on the literary creation itself rather than the author/reader or any other extrinsic systems.

To Russian Formalists, and especially to Victor Shklovsky, literariness, or the distinction between literary and non-literary texts, is accomplished through ‘defamiliarization’. A main characteristic of literary texts is that they make the language unfamiliar to the reader and deviate from ordinary language. They have the capacity to defamiliarise our habitual perceptions of the real world and the capacity to estrange it. Shklovsky stated that the purpose of art is to disrupt the automatic response to things and give it a new and unforeseen perception. Defamiliarised language will draw attention to itself: as our perceptions are automatic, it will force the reader to notice the unfamiliar through a variety of different techniques i.e. wordplay, rhythm, figures of speech and so on.

Another key term in defamiliarisation and literariness introduced by Shklovsky is the concept of ‘plot’. For Shklovsky, the plot is the most important feature of a narrative as he claims that there is a distinctive difference between ‘story’ and ‘plot’. The story of a narrative entails the normal temporal sequence of events whereas the plot is a distortion of the normal storyline and thus associated with defamiliarisation.

The idea of defamiliarisation was further explored by the Prague School Theory with one of the main scholars, Jan Mukarovsky, and by later developments in the theory of Roman Jakobson. Jan Mukarovsky postulates the idea that linguistic deviation, such as foregrounding, is the hallmark of poetic texts. He claimed that the use of linguistic devices such as tone, metaphor, ambiguity, patterning and parallelism distinguish ordinary language from poetic language. In the 1960s, Jacobson introduced the poetic function of literary texts and further developed the idea that the use of certain linguistic choices draw attention to the language of texts. He placed poetic language at the centre of his inquiry and emphasized that phonetically and syntactically repeated linguistic elements distinguish literary from non-literary texts. He tried to define literariness by distinguishing between six functions of language: the emotive, referential, phatic, metalingual, conative and poetic function. To Jacobson, the poetic function is the most important function as it mainly focuses on the message itself. The different linguistic devices in a piece of literary text initiate the reader to have a closer look at the happenings in the text which without linguistic distortion, might have been left unnoticed. Thus, Roman Jakobson emphasised that what makes a literary text is merely associated with the language as self-sufficient entity while reference to social life, history, or anything outside the language is irrelevant.

== Literary and non-literary texts ==
=== Literary texts ===
==== Literary poems ====
Some examples of defamiliarisation in poetic literary texts are Shakespeare’s sonnet starting with ‘My mistresses eyes are nothing like the sun’ in which rhyme and metre supply a poetic framework or Dickinson’s 'I felt a funeral in my brain' in which the strategic use of the words in the title already creates a notion of new and unfamiliar.

==== Literary novels ====
Two British eighteenth century writers were often cited as a reference for narrative literary texts by Russian Formalists i.e. Jonathan Swift’s Gulliver's Travels and Laurence Sterne’s The Life and Opinions of Tristram Shandy, Gentleman. In Gulliver’s Travels, the overt disproportion between the characters i.e. between Gulliver and the Lilliputians, is an example of defamiliarisation from the real world as it draws attention to the unusual size of the characters. In Tristram Shandy, familiar actions are defamiliarised by being slowed down i.e. the narration is overtly and playfully interrupted, slowed down or accelerated. Furthermore, there is a distortion of the storyline, as the narrative structure and plot patterns are highlighted by positioning chapter 18 and 19 after chapter 25. The same can be noticed in Marcel Proust’s Remembrance of Things Past in which he tells the entire novel retrospectively, from the past to the present.

=== Non-literary texts ===
While in Russian Formalism and Prague structuralism literary texts were seen as the ones that use language in aesthetic and estranged ways, non-literary texts were those that used everyday language precisely and accurately. They consisted of everyday texts, such as newspaper or magazine articles, letters, brochures, advertisements, reports, or editorials.

== Development of new theories on literariness ==
=== New theories ===
In the 1970s, some scholars moved away from the solely linguistic theory adopted by the Russian Formalists and started acknowledging the role of the reader to establish a theoretical discipline. Many of these scholars, who included Jonathan Culler, Stanley Fish, and Umberto Eco, stated that literariness cannot be defined solely on the basis of linguistic properties found within a text but that the reader is also a crucial factor in the construction of meaning.

They acknowledged the fact that foregrounding is a feature of poetry, however, claimed that language structures such as foregrounding can also be found in ordinary texts e.g. advertisement. Jakobson agrees that such poetic functions can be found in any text but argues that the dominance of those functions over other functions is what makes a text a poetic text. Although this justification was accepted by later scholars, Jakobson’s theory was still not perceived as a perfectly acceptable condition for the separation of literary from ordinary texts. As a result, Culler and Fish emphasized that the crucial aspect of literariness is not the poetic construction of a text but the conventional expectations that are involved. Their main emphasis was on a reader-oriented theory which goes beyond a solely textual perception and focuses on the role of the reader in processing and interpreting a text. Fish argued that meaning and literariness are not textual properties but rely on interpretative constructions by the reader. Readers are members of certain social communities in which certain conventions and patterns persist and in which they acquire certain interpretive strategies. He argued that a certain interpretation of a text will only occur because of the conventional strategies that determine the interpretive community.

Strong opposition to the Formalist theory has not only been voiced by reader-oriented theories but also by Marxist critics, speech act theory and new historicism. They all agreed that the view on a distinct definition between ordinary and literary texts should be rejected.

=== Two views on literariness ===
Thus, the search for a definition of literariness has developed in two directions. The first direction is the Russian Formalist's approach which assumes that there is a difference between literary and ordinary texts with features specific to literary language. The second approach rejects this assumption, as those linguistic features can be found in any other instance of language use. This approach moves the interest from the grammatical structures, syntax and semantics, to that of pragmatics which analyses the author's and the reader's view on the text.

== Modern theories on literariness ==
Nowadays, theorists disagree on the issue of what is understood by literariness. In the 1990s, a number of scholars reintroduced the model of formalism to define literariness. Theorists such as Van Dijk and Kintsch focus on the cognitive aspects of meaning representation and say that literariness must seek a basis not in linguistic theory but in a cognitive pragmatic one. Zwaan claims that readers develop cognitive control systems for specific types of discourse which monitors the comprehension of literary texts. Yet other scholars think that a theory of literariness is merely impossible.
