= Austin Warren (scholar) =

American literary critic (1899-1986)

- Born: July 4, 1899; Waltham, Massachusetts
- Died: August 20, 1986 (aged 87); Providence, Rhode Island
- Awards: Guggenheim Fellowship (1949)

Austin Warren (July 4, 1899 – August 20, 1986) was an American literary critic, author, and professor of English.

== Childhood and education ==
Edward Austin Warren Jr. was born in Waltham, Massachusetts, on July 4, 1899, as the elder of two sons by Edward Austin Warren, city alderman of Waltham and expert butcher, and Nellie Myra Anderson Warren. He attended public grammar school in Ashburnham, Massachusetts, and briefly attended Waltham High School, where he received instruction in Latin and studied Esperanto independently. At the age of thirteen, Warren and his family relocated to a lonely farm in Stow, Massachusetts. He attended Hale High School and received additional training in Latin; he would later consider this instruction responsible for his classical major at college.

Warren entered Wesleyan University unenthusiastically in the fall of 1916. There he discovered the works of Jane Austen, Emily Dickinson, and Emanuel Swedenborg. As a senior he dabbled in writing poetry and criticism and was elected to Phi Beta Kappa; at his commencement, he was class poet. He graduated with a major in Latin and a minor in English.

Warren entered the Graduate School of Harvard University in the fall of 1921. There he studied Romanticism with Irving Babbitt, whom he admired greatly. In the fall of 1922, Warren entered the Graduate College of Princeton University where he received a Ph.D. in 1926 for his doctoral dissertation, titled Pope as Literary Critic, under the direction of Robert Wilbur Root.

== Warren as an educator ==
When Warren was 21 years old the University of Kentucky hired him as an instructor of English. After his year at Harvard, he taught at the University of Minnesota. While he was a graduate student at Princeton, Warren cofounded St. Peter's School of Liberal and Humane Studies with Benny Bissell, a fellow young academic, and served as dean for two weeks during each summer until 1931.

Warren began teaching at Boston University's College of Practical Arts and Letters in 1926. In 1930 he left Boston to study for a year in London on a fellowship founded by the American Council of Learned Societies. He worked part-time at the British Museum and made progress on the works he later published as Richard Crashaw: A Study in the Baroque Sensibility and Alexander Pope as Critic and Humanist. Warren made the acquaintances of T. S. Eliot and Evelyn Underhill before returning to Boston University in the fall of 1931, where he became a Professor of English before his departure in 1939.

In 1939 Warren joined the English Department of the University of Iowa to teach criticism and the history of criticism. He married Eleanor Blake on September 13, 1941, and soon met René Wellek, with whom he collaborated on Theory of Literature from 1944 to 1946, though Eleanor Blake's death in January 1946 interfered with the book's production schedule. He befriended Allen Tate in 1947 before leaving for the University of Michigan in the fall of 1948.

Warren taught at the University of Michigan for twenty years. During this period he was Fellow of the Kenyon School of English during the summers of 1948-1950, a Senior Fellow of Indiana University's School of Letters from 1950 to 1964 and New York University's Berg Visiting Professor of English from 1953 to 1954. In 1951 he was awarded a Guggenheim Fellowship. On September 5, 1959, he married Antonia Degen Keese. Warren retired from the University of Michigan in 1968. He was known for his then-revolutionary abandonment of the formal lecture.

== Later life ==
Warren moved to Providence, Rhode Island, in 1970. He received a Literary Award from the American Academy of Arts and Letters in 1973, an Honorary Litt.D. from Brown University in 1974, and was offered membership in the National Institute of Arts and Letters in 1975. He lived in Providence until his death on August 20, 1986. He was 87 years old and was survived by his wife, Antonia.

== Warren as critic ==
Generally, Warren described himself as an "old New Critic" and did not disagree with his contemporary structuralist critics, though he modestly confessed that he did not always understand them. Despite this self-description, Warren was independent in his critical views, often refusing to approach literature from any one set of theoretical methodology. He was not a religious critic, but he often approached works in the contexts of spirituality and Christianity.

In a preface to his essay collection, Connections, Warren professed his critical stance:

As a literary critic, I have no "method," no specialty, but am what is called, in another discipline, a "general practitioner" . . . I look through my repertory for the methods and the mixture of methods appropriate to the case before me—in consequence of which the proportion of stylistic analysis to biographical, or biographical to ideological, will be found to vary from essay to essay.

Warren's generalism, however, was not entirely undecided. He expressed ideals commonly referred to by other New Critics of his time when he said that "The final necessity for the critic is, ideally, space and time for withdrawal, for critical distancing; absorption, withdrawal, often repeated, are constantly procedures of criticism."

== Theory of Literature ==
With René Wellek, Warren authored the landmark classic Theory of Literature in 1944–46, an influential and comprehensive analysis of the American New Criticism movement. According to Wellek, the work was written with the idea between Warren and himself that "we should rather combine our forces to produce a book which would formulate a theory of literature with an emphasis on the aesthetic fact which cannot be divorced from evaluation and hence from criticism."

Wellek contributed insights he acquired from his familiarities with Russian formalism, the Prague Linguistic Circle, the phenomenology of Roman Ingarden, and the movements of German Geistesgeschichte and stylistics. Warren’s contributions to the work stemmed from his knowledge of American New Criticism, aesthetics, and the history of criticism. Harcourt, Brace and Company published Theory of Literature in December 1948 with an imprint of 1949, and by 1976, at the time of the publication of the celebratory collection Teacher & Critic: Essays by and about Austin Warren, it had been translated into eighteen languages (Spanish, Italian, Japanese, Korean, German, Portuguese, Hebrew, Danish, Serbocroat, modern Greek, Swedish, Rumanian, Finnish, Hindi, Norwegian, Polish, French, and Hungarian, in order).

The work encompasses "definitions and distinctions" of the natures and functions of literature; literary theory, criticism, and history; and general, comparative, and national literature. Warren and Wellek discuss an extrinsic approach to the study of literature involving approaching literature from perspectives of biography, psychology, society, ideas, and other arts. Theory of Literature also discusses an intrinsic approach to studying literature, discussing the use of devices such as euphony, rhythm, meter, stylistics, imagery, metaphor, symbols, and myth. The work concludes with a discussion of literary genres, history, and the study of literature in the graduate school.

Since its publication, Terence B. Spencer, a former director of the Shakespeare Institute at University of Birmingham, has testified that it "broke our [English] resistance to literary concepts and woke us from our lethargy." Allen Tate has professed that "Theory of Literature has done more towards civilizing the teaching of literature than any other work of our time."

== Selected bibliography ==
- Alexander Pope as Critic and Humanist (1929)
- Nathaniel Hawthorne: Representative Selections (editor) (1934)
- The Elder Henry James (1934)
- Richard Crashaw: A Study in the Baroque Sensibility (1939)
- Literary Scholarship: Its Aims and Methods (with Norman Foerster, J. C. McGalliard, René Wellek, W. L. Schramm) (1941)
- Rage for Order: Essays in Criticism (1948)
- Theory of Literature (with René Wellek) (1949)
- New England Saints (1956)
- The New England Conscience (1966)
- They Will Remain: Poems by Susan Pendleton (editor) (1966)
- Connections (1970)
- Teacher and Critic: Essays by and about Austin Warren (edited by Myron Simon and Harvey Gross) (1976)
- Becoming What One Is, 1899–1936 (1995)
- In Continuity: The Last Essays of Austin Warren (introduced and edited by George A. Panichas) (1996)
