= Geistesgeschichte =

Concept in the history of ideas

Geistesgeschichte (from German Geist, "spirit" or "mind" [here connoting the metaphysical realm, in contradistinction to the material], and Geschichte, "history") is a concept in the history of ideas denoting the branch of study concerned with the undercurrents of cultural manifestations, within the history of a people, that are peculiar to a specific timeframe.

The term is largely untranslatable, sometimes translated as "intellectual history" or "history of ideas", and sometimes used synonymously with Problemgeschichte. The branch of study it denotes is often seen as having been inspired by the type of work done by Wilhelm Dilthey and his followers.

== Bibliography ==
- Fabio Tononi, “Dvořák’s Geistesgeschichte Against Progress in Kulturgeschichte: A Comparative Perspective”, Umění/Art - Journal of the Institute of Art History, Academy of Sciences of the Czech Republic, Vol. 72, no. 4 (2024), pp. 367-378.

== See also ==
- Wilhelm Dilthey
- Max Dvořák
- Erich Heller
