= René Wellek =

Czech-American literary critic

- Born: René Wellek; August 22, 1903; Vienna, Austria-Hungary
- Died: November 10, 1995 (aged 92); Hamden, Connecticut
- Occupation: Literary critic

René Wellek (August 22, 1903 – November 10, 1995) was a Czech-American comparative literary critic. Like Erich Auerbach, Wellek was a product of the Central European philological tradition and was known as a "fair-minded critic of critics."

== Biography ==
René Wellek was born and raised in Vienna, speaking Czech and German. He studied literature at the Charles University in Prague, and was active among the Prague School linguists there, before moving to teach at School of Slavonic and East European Studies (now part of University College London) in 1935. His younger brother Albert Wellek (1904–1972) was one of the founders of musical psychology and lived in Germany. Before 1939, Wellek published some 60 items, all written in Czech.

From 1939, the beginning of World War II in Europe, Wellek lived in America. He taught first at the University of Iowa for seven years until 1946, and then, beginning in that year, at Yale University, where he established and chaired a department of comparative literature. In the United States, he was "widely regarded as a founder of the study of comparative literature." With Austin Warren, Wellek published a landmark volume entitled Theory of Literature, one of the first works to systematize literary theory.

Beginning in the 1960s, Wellek defended the New Critics against the condemnation of their work in the name of a structuralist-influenced literary theory, and is thus sometimes classed as a conservative critic. Wellek advocated a synthesized approach to literary criticism, one that included 1) literary theory, 2) a careful study of previous works of criticism, and 3) a thorough understanding of the surrounding history involved in an author's creation of a work, including the author's personal history and milieu. Any approach elevating one of these aspects above the other would be in error. Wellek said the best literary critic must "do what every scientist and scholar does: to isolate his object, in our case, the literary work of art, to contemplate it intently, to analyze, to interpret, and finally to evaluate it by criteria derived from, verified by, buttressed by, as wide a knowledge, as close an observation, as keen a sensibility, as honest a judgment as we can command." According to Wellek, bringing all of literary theory, criticism, and history into consideration allows a critic to achieve "victory over impermanence, relativity, and history."

Wellek was an elected member of both the American Academy of Arts and Sciences and the American Philosophical Society.

The crowning work of Wellek's career was an eight-volume magnum opus entitled A History of Modern Criticism: 1750-1950, the last two volumes of which he dictated from his bed in a nursing home at age 92.

== Bibliography ==
=== Books ===
- Immanuel Kant in England 1793–1838, Princeton: Princeton UP, 1931. [Dissertation]
- The Rise of English Literary History, Chapel Hill: The University of North Carolina Press, 1941.
- Literature and Ideas, Charlottesville: The University of Virginia, 1948.
- Theory of Literature (with Austin Warren), New York: Harcourt, Brace, and Co., 1949.
- A History of Modern Criticism 1750–1950, New Haven: Yale UP, 1955–1992. (8 Volumes)
- Dostoevsky: A Collection of Critical Essays, Englewood Cliffs, NJ: Prentice Hall, 1962. (Introduction pp. 1–15; Anthology)
- Concepts of Criticism, Ed. Stephen G. Nichols, Jr. New Haven: Yale UP, 1963. (Collection of Wellek's essays)
- Essays on Czech Literature, The Hague: Mouton and Co., 1963.
- Confrontations: Studies in the Intellectual and Literary Relations between Germany, England, and the United States during the Nineteenth Century, Princeton: Princeton UP, 1965.
- The Literary Theory and Aesthetics of the Prague School, Ann Arbor: University of Michigan, 1969.
- Discriminations: Further Concepts of Criticism, New Haven: Yale UP, 1971.
- Evidence in Literary Scholarship: Essays in Memory of James Marshall Osborn, (with Alvaro Ribeiro) Oxford: Oxford UP, 1979. (Anthology)
- Four Critics: Croce, Valéry, Lukács, and Ingarden, Seattle: Washington UP, 1981.
- Chekhov: New Perspectives (Twentieth Century Views), (with Nonna D. Wellek) Englewood Cliffs: Prentice-Hall Inc., 1981. (Anthology)
- The Attack on Literature and Other Essays, Chapel Hill: The University of North Carolina Press, 1982. (Collection of Wellek's essays)

=== Journal articles ===
- "Prospect and Retrospect", Journal of Comparative Literature and Aesthetics (JCLA), Vol. 1, No. 2, Winter 1978.
