= Eka Budianta =

Indonesian poet

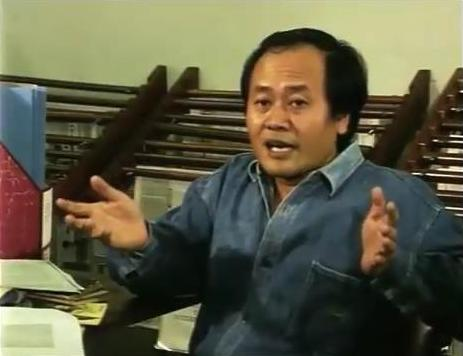
- Budianta in 1994
- Born: Christophorus Apolinaris Eka Budianta Martoredjo; 1 February 1956 (age 70); Ngimbang, East Java
- Occupation: Writer
- Writing career
- Pen name: Khriskanta, B.
- Language: Indonesian
- Genre: Poetry

Christophorus Apolinaris Eka Budianta Martoredjo (born 1956 in Ngimbang, East Java) is an Indonesian poet. He is also known as C. A. Eka Budianta and more commonly known as Eka Budianta.

== Early life ==
He was born into a Catholic family and was the second child of nine. His grandparents were farmers. His parents were public elementary school teachers; his father later worked at the local office for the Ministry Education and his mother became a school principal. After graduating from St. Albertus high school in Malang (Dempo), he attended the Lembaga Pendidikan Kesenian Jakarta, now known as Institut Kesenian Jakarta, but did not complete his studies. From 1975 to 1979, Eka Budianta studied Japanese literature at the Department of East Asian Studies Literature; he then moved to the Department of History at the University of Indonesia. He subsequently studied journalism at Los Angeles Trade-Technical College in the United States from 1980 to 1981. He also worked as a reporter for Tempo weekly newsmagazine and the Japanese newspaper Yomiuri Shimbun.

== Career ==
He later worked for the BBC in London, where he currently resides. He was an Honorary Fellow in Writing at the University of Iowa in 1987 and a Fulbright Visiting Scholar at Cornell University, Ithaca in 1990. He published his first collection of poetry, Ada (There Is), in 1976. Since that time he has published several more volumes, including Bang Bang Tut (Bang Bang Toot!), Bel (Bell), Rel (Rail), Sabda Bersahut Sabda (Friend to Friend), Sejuta Milyar Satu (One Million One) and Lautan Cinta (Sea of Love).

In 2002, Eka Budianta's work Pohon dan Istrinya (The Tree and its Wife) was recognized along with works by 12 other authors by the Indonesian daily newspaper Kompas, and included in an annual publication featuring a selection of short stories.

== Personal life ==
He is married to Melani Budianta, a professor of literature at the University of Indonesia.

== Publications ==
- Ada (There Is), Jakarta. 1976. 32 pages. (poetry)
- Bang Bang Tut (Bang Bang Toot!). 1976. (poetry)
- Bel (Bell), Jakarta: Puisi Indonesia. 1977. 32 pages. (poetry)
- Rel (Rail), Jakarta: Puisi Indonesia. 1978. 32 pages. (poetry)
- Sabda Bersahut Sabda(Friend to Friend), Kuala Lumpur : Syarikat Percektan Suarasa. 1978. 56 pages. (anthology of poetry co-authored with Azmi Yusoff)
- Cerita di Kebun Kopi, Jakarta: Balai Pustaka. 1981. 40 pages. (poetry)
- Sejuta Milyar Satu (One Million One), Jakarta: Penerbit Arcan . 1984. 50 pages.(poetry)
- Api Rindu, Jakarta: Pustaka Maria. 1987. 100 pages. (collection of short stories)
- Lautan Cinta (Sea of Love). Jakarta: Pustaka Maria. 1988. (poetry)
- Menggebrak Dunia Mengarang. 1992. (poetry)
- Mengembalikan Kepercayaan Rakyat. 1992. (essay)
- Rumahku Dunia. 1993. (poetry)
- Dari Negeri Poci. Jakarta: Pustaka Sastra. 1993. (poetry anthology)

and many more
