= Muhammad Kasim =

Indonesian writer

Mohammad Kasim
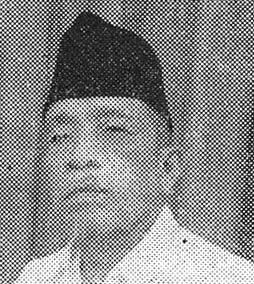
- M. Kasim, undated
- Born: 1886; Muara Sipongi, Mandailing Natal

Muhammad Kasim (born 1886) was an elementary school teacher and writer in the Dutch East Indies who published several books. His short story collection Teman Doedoek is considered the first short story collection in the Indonesian literary canon.

== Biography ==
Kasim was born in Muara Sipongi, North Sumatra, in 1886.

== Bibliography ==
- Pemandangan dalam Dunia Kanak-Kanak (1928, children's story)
- Muda Teruna (1922, novel)
- "Bertengkar dan Berbisik" (short story)
- "Bual di Kedai Kopi" (short story)
- "Ja Binuang Pergi Berburu" (short story)
- Niki Bahtera (1920, translation of children's story by C.J. Kieviet)
- Pangeran Hindi (1931, translation of children's story)
- Teman Doedoek (1936, short story collection)
