= Early Modern Czech =

Stage of Czech before the 1840s

- Region: Central Europe
- Era: developed into Modern Czech
- Language family: Indo-European: Balto-Slavic; Slavic; West Slavic; Czech–Slovak; Early Modern Czech
- Early forms: Old Czech: Middle Czech
- Writing system: Latin

Language codes
- ISO 639-3: –
- Glottolog: None

Early Modern Czech (Czech: obrozenská čeština) is the period in the History of the Czech language between 1780s to the 1840s. It gave rise to Modern Czech.

== Background ==
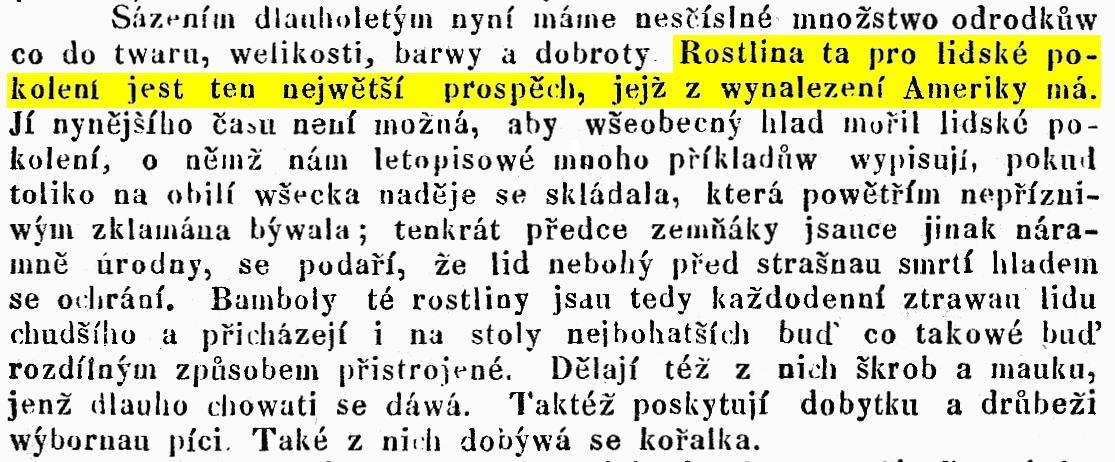
Sample (1846)

With the abolition of serfdom in 1781 (by Joseph II), the population's attachment to a certain territory was loosened and the conditions for changes in national relations were created. The population from the Czech-speaking countryside came en masse to work in Germanized cities, where industry was developing. This created a favorable situation for the spread of the Enlightenment ideas of the revival of the Czech nation, initiated by the enlightened intelligentsia. The spoken language of the rural population was strongly territorially differentiated, while the differences between the dialects in Moravia and Silesia were more distinct than in Bohemia due to the remoteness from the Central Bohemian innovation center. As the population moved, the distinct differences gradually began to fade. Czech in the cities, if it survived, was saturated with German lexical elements and calques and functionally, similarly to rural dialects, it was limited to the area of everyday life. The government policy with the aim of creating a unified Austrian nation, whose language was to be German, was ultimately made impossible by the revival process. The first manifestations of revival ideas were defenses of the language. The first of these is considered to be the edition of Bohuslav Balbín's Dissertatio apologetica pro lingua Slavonica, praecipue Bohemica (Defense of the Slavic, Especially Czech Language), which was compiled in 1775 by František Martin Pelcl (the work itself was written in 1672). Pelcl's Preface to the Kind Reader (Czech: Předmluva k laskavému čtenáři), which introduced the edition of the Příhod Václav Vratislav of Mitrovic (1777), and his Academic Inaugural Address on the Usefulness and Importance of the Czech Language (German: Akademische Antrittsrede über den Nutzen und Wichtigkeit der Böhmischen Sprache, 1793), also had the nature of a defense. Objectively, the defenses were most effective when they aroused interest in written literature, pointed to its rich history and high level in ancient times. Editions of works of old literature played an important role in the revival movement. In order to reintroduce the literary language into the areas of communication from which it had been displaced, especially in demanding literature, it was necessary to newly codify the standard of the written language. The possibility of codifying the contemporary language of lower-style literature (books of folk reading, shopkeepers' songs, folk theater) did not seem satisfactory, because it was not suitable for demanding literature. Baroque homilies, the most widespread genre of the previous era, were factually foreign to the Enlightenment intelligentsia. The alternative was a shift to the language of older literature of high style. The starting point for grammatical codification was therefore the literary usage of the late 16th century and the language of Comenius. This is how Pelcl conceived his work Grundsätze der böhmischen Grammatik (1775), certainly under the influence of Dobrovský, who also prepared a section on prosody for his grammar. The division of declension types of nouns is also taken from Dobrovský. In this way, his starting point differs from Toms's Böhmische Sprachlehre (1782) and Thám's (Kurzgefasste böhmische Sprachlehre…, 1785), which take into account the morphological state of contemporary usage. Pelcl codified the phonetics without the diphthong ej in endings (nom.singular dobrý), but allows it in word bases (such as hejbati), and codifies the diphthong ou in the root (oul). It requires the distinction of double l. The morphology fully corresponds to the high style of humanistic Czech, including the congruence of transitive verbs. It introduces the accusative-nominative. form in the plural of inanimate masculine (duby, keře). Syntax is devoted to the simple sentence, paying little attention to complex sentences. It restores the phenomena of higher style, e.g. the genitive of negation, and requires genitive government for a number of verbs. The section on prosody does not accept either the old syllabic principle or the tense principle and formulates the foundations of syllabic prosody. Similarly to Jan Václav Pohl, Pelcl supplements the grammar with examples of conversations, but their language is freed from elements of commonly spoken urban language and purist neologisms. Dobrovský in his grammars Ausführliches Lehrgebäude der böhmischen Sprache (1809) and Lehrgebäude der böhmischen Sprache (1819) codifies essentially the same state as Pelcl, with the exception of a single l. Dobrovský's concept of grammars is different, however: the focus of the morphological sections here is on a comprehensive description of word formation (in the first version it takes up over half of the total scope, in the second about a third). This special attention to word formation was of fundamental importance for the further development of the language. The section on syntax formulates, among other things, a rule on the use of transitive conjunctions when subjects are identical. The grammatical norm codified by Dobrovský was generally accepted, not only because of his scientific authority, but above all because it suited the effort to differentiate the literary language from common usage. Therefore, in further development, the use of the diphthong ej in word bases (hejbati) and ou at the beginning of words (oul) gave way. In syntax, humanistic sentences were gradually adopted, although the syntactic parts of grammars with complex sentences were not studied.

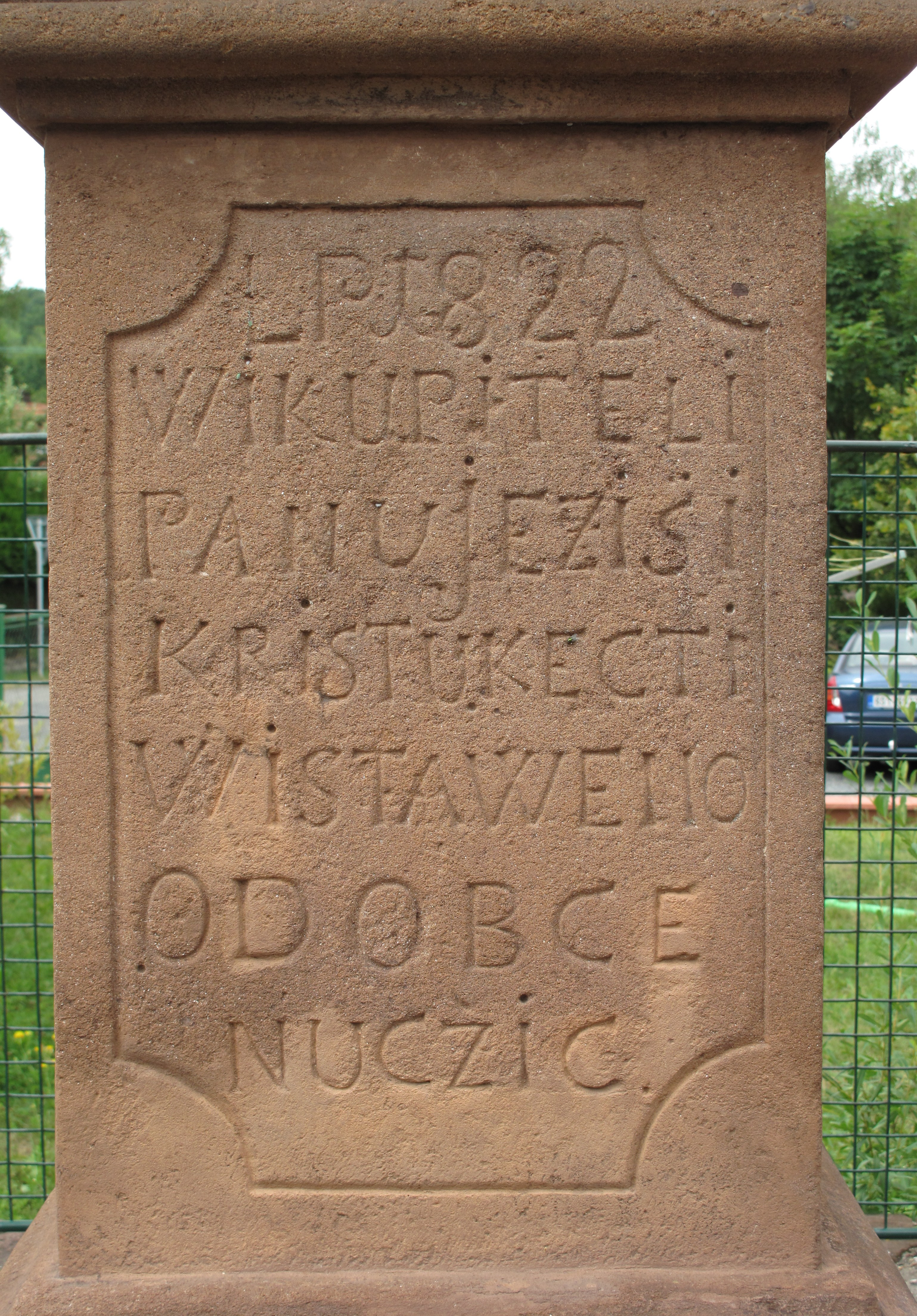
Wayside shrine in Nučice, dated 1822.

The artistic literature often resorted to archaisms and did not respect the natural development of the spoken language. This was due to attempts to reach the prestige literal styles. In the 1840s, the goal of the Czech language revival was fulfilled: the grammatical norm of the written language was codified and gradually introduced into wide use; its vocabulary was supplemented so that it met the requirements of literature of a higher style and a professional scientific style. Czech was reintroduced to all functions from which it had been partially or completely displaced in the previous period. The number of users of the written language increased significantly and Czech thus ranked alongside the languages of other Central European nations.

== Orthography ==
With the time goes on, the orthography was liberated from the relics of the Brethren orthography (Czech: bratrský pravopis). According to the etymology, si, zi or sy, zy came to be written, cy was replaced by ci. Antiqua was introduced instead of fractura in printing, and it led to the removal of the digraph ʃʃ and its replacement by the letter š. The long í replaced j, and j replaced g (gegj > její 'hers'). An orthographical debate (Czech: Spor jotistů s ypsilonisty) whether to replace y with i (at the time being it did not make any difference in pronunciation) sparked by Václav Hanka, who was an ardent pan-Slavist, marked the highlight of the era. In the 1840s, the double w was replaced by v and ou replaced the traditional au.

During the first half of the 19th century, the syntactic principle of placing a comma was finally stabilized, i.e. the placement of a comma between the starting point and the core of the statement was removed, appositions, short subordinate clauses, vocatives and interjections began to be separated. Gradually, a comma was no longer written before a, i, or in the meaning of a conjunction. It was no longer strictly required not to write a comma before these conjunctions in a conjunction relationship. The writing of a comma separating transitional phrases continued to fluctuate. The colon was held for a very long time as a means of clarifying extensive sentences, which was hierarchically higher than the semicolon, as was common in the spelling of Czech in the Middle Ages. Similarly, in the first half of the 19th century, the writing of an exclamation mark and a question mark in the middle of a sentence was still maintained.

== Vocabulary and Word formation ==
After the stabilization of the grammatical norm, it was necessary to supplement the vocabulary. Czech, which had been pushed out of most literary genres and especially science for a long time, lacked the necessary vocabulary categories, mainly professional terminology and then stylistically symptomatic lexical layers characteristic of poetry and fiction in general. Only musical terminology, which was the only one that could rely on the Baroque tradition thanks to a certain continuity, was supplemented earlier, in Jakub Jan Ryba's work Počáteční a vězného základy ke svečem úmení hudebnému, published posthumously in 1817. Knowledge of humanistic Czech protected Ryba from the voluntaristic neologization of Baroque grammarians. Ryba introduced new terms in the spirit of humanistic Czech, i.e. non-puristically and systematically. He uses international terms (such as: intonace), words of Italian origin (fortepiano), words of German origin (faldhorn) and thus creates Czech equivalents (zpěvohra, odrážka...). Other creators of musical terminology could build on this foundation, especially Jan Nepomuk Škroup. The first revival generation relied on the spontaneous development of the lexicon in literary work. But translations from contemporary literatures of European nations would not have been possible without lexical neologisms. Therefore, the generation led by Josef Jungmann developed a program of targeted enrichment of the lexicon. It consisted in restoring forgotten Old Czech words, adopting from territorial dialects, spontaneously completing the vocabulary in the literary process, adopting words from other Slavic languages, deliberately creating words by derivation and composition and also in calquing from foreign languages. These sources were applied to varying degrees. When publishing works of older literature, a number of words were actually newly introduced into use, such as doba, chory, vašitný, vazba…, some, such as hrot, jarý, níti, were revived by forgeries of the manuscripts of Královédvorský and Zelenohorský. Territorial dialects did not meet the expectations of the revivalists, because their scope is narrower than that of the written language. Adoption from other Slavic languages, however, exceeded expectations, mainly Polish and Russian were used as sources, and to a limited extent (in botanical terminology) also Serbian, Croatian, Slovenian and Ukrainian. Words adopted from Polish, such as okres, věda, mluvnice, podmět, obřad, opis, vzájemnost, zdroj, svěží, podlý, bádat, budovat, and from the Russian language, such as příroda, nápěv, záliv, závod, enriched mainly the terminological layers of the vocabulary. Several words were borrowed from Dobrovsky's Literarische Nachrichten von der Reise nach Schweden und Russland published in 1796: děva, nozdry, brvy, vkus, šum, vesna, pyl, vzduch, zeleň, vojín, lepý, blahý. In addition to terminology, borrowed words were used as means of poetic language. However, the creation of new words prevailed to the greatest extent. The best prerequisite for them was Dobrovsky's description of the regularities of word formation contained in his grammars. New formations were created in accordance with the regularities of word formation and quickly took hold. In particular, derivation with a zero suffix (náběh, ohled), the suffix ‑ost (obraznost, pozornost, představivost), ‑stvo (svlasto, občenstvo, bezolstvo, horstvo), derivation of names of bearers of properties with various suffixes was used, in which marginal suffixes were also used, which were used to supplement the terminology (hraboš, outloň, mečoun, rypouš, prvok, bledule, sviňucha). The artistic style used neologisms with the suffix ‑ina (skalina, šočalina, ľučina). To a greater extent than expected, calques in the form of compounds were used, namely in linguistic terminology (názvosloví, zeměpis, zákonodárce, přírodozpyt). Under the influence of Jungmann's dictionary, the use of the verbal prefix po‑ in the distributive function (porozhazovati), which partially displaced the older prefix z‑ as in zvyrážeti. The surviving Baroque purism was gradually replaced and international terms were also used in the terminology (logika instead of umnice, fyzika instead of silozpyt).

== See also ==
- History of the Czech language
- Orthographia bohemica
- Czech alphabet
- Czech declension
- Czech orthography
- Czech phonology
- Czech verb
- Czech word order

== Bibliography ==
- Hauser, Přemysl (1978). Tvoření podstatných jmen v době národního obrození (in Czech). Brno: Universita J. E. Purkyně.
- Havránek, Bohuslav (1980). Vývoj českého spisovného jazyka (in Czech). Prague: Státní pedagogické nakladatelství.
- Komárek, Miroslav (2012). Dějiny českého jazyka (in Czech). Brno: Host. ISBN 978-80-7294-591-7.
