= Czech word order =

Aspect of Czech grammar

Czech word order is relatively free. However, the Czech language belongs to the SVO type.

Czech word order is said to be free. The individual parts of a sentence need not necessarily be placed in a firmly given sequence. Word order is very flexible and allows many variants of messages. It is enabled by the fact that syntactic relations are indicated by inflection forms (declension and conjugation) in Czech.

Word order is not arbitrary at all. It must respect logical relations between words and some other principles. Constructions which enable two or more interpretations should be avoided. Speakers choose the word order according to the communication aim and the emotional state. That principle is called functional sentence perspective.

Basic word order is SVO (subject – verb – object) in Czech sentences. It is used in neutral messages:

- Petr má nový byt. – Peter has (got) a new flat.

(Peter (S) has (V) new flat (O).)

Definite and indefinite articles are not used in Czech.

== Objective word order ==
A sentence usually begins with facts, already known from a preceding sentence or context (theme). New and important facts (rheme) are usually placed in the final position:

- Včera zemřel známý herec. – A famous actor died yesterday. (An announcement of a death of a person – who died?)

(Yesterday died (V) famous actor (S).)

- (Ten) známý herec zemřel včera. – The famous actor died yesterday. (When did he die?)

((The) famous actor (S) died (V) yesterday.)

- Byl jednou jeden král a ten král měl tři dcery. – Once upon a time there lived a king and the king had three daughters.

(Was (V) once one king (S) and the king (S) had (V) three daughters (O).)

== Subjective word order ==
New facts can be emphasized by their initial place in emotive messages:

- Tisíc korun jsem utratil za takovou hloupost! – I spent one thousand crowns on such a stupid thing!

(Thousand crowns (O) (null-S) am (aux. verb) spent (V) on such stupid thing!)

== Null-subject sentences ==
The subject may be omitted in a Czech sentence if it is obvious by context. The grammatical person and the grammatical number are expressed by the verb conjugation forms:

- Mám byt. = Já mám byt. – I have (got) a flat.

((null-S) Have (V) flat (O). = I (S) have (V) flat (O).)

- Máš byt. = Ty máš byt. – You have (got) a flat.

((null-S) Have (V) flat (O). = You (S) have (V) flat (O).)

Subject personal pronouns are usually omitted in literary language. They are more frequent in colloquial language.

== Questions ==
The VSO word order is often used for the question formation. Questions are primarily indicated by prosodic means, especially by intonation, in speech and by a question mark (?) in writing:

- Petr nemá nový byt. – Peter doesn't have a new flat.

(Peter (S) not has (V) (a) new flat (O)(.))

- Petr nemá nový byt? – Peter doesn't have a new flat?

(Peter (S) not has (V) (a) new flat (O)(.))

- Nemá Petr nový byt? – Doesn't Peter have a new flat?

(Not has (V) Peter (S) (a) new flat (O)(?))

== Attributes ==
The position of noun attributes depends primarily on whether they are in grammatical accordance with the superior noun or not.

=== Attributive adjectives ===
Attributive adjectives are usually prepositive, preceding superior nouns. The case and the number of adjectives and nouns are always in grammatical accordance: adjectives are declined together with the noun:

- a new flat: nový byt (nom.), nového bytu (gen.), novému bytu (dat.), etc.

In some special cases the adjective can be placed after the noun: in scientific terminology, names of historical persons, listings, for emphasis, etc.:

- kyselina sírová (acid (noun) sulphuric (adj.)) – sulphuric acid, meduňka lékařská – lemon balm (Melissa officinalis)
- Karel IV. (Čtvrtý) – Charles IV
- Prodáváme dřevo smrkové, borové a lipové. – We sell spruce, pine and linden wood.

((null-S) Sell (V) wood (O) spruce (adj.), pine (adj.) and linden (adj.).)

Complex constructions are also usually postpositive:

- hodiny řízené rádiem – radio-controlled clock

(clock controlled radio (instr.))

In declension:

- Genitive: hodin řízených rádiem
- Dative: hodinám řízeným rádiem

etc.

Note that "rádiem" remains in the instrumental form and imitates the adjective, not the noun.

A further order inversion can occur, maybe influenced by English:

rádiem řízené hodiny

However, that word order is not natural for Czech and may cause confusion.

=== Appositional adjuncts ===
Attributes that are not in grammatical accordance with the superior nouns are usually postpositional. Such attributes keep their grammatical form regardless of noun declension:

časování sloves
conjugation verb.GEN.PL
"verb conjugation"

cestování vlakem
travelling train-INST
"travelling by train"

== Clitics ==
Unstressed words, clitics, form stress units with preceding stressed words. For rhythm, they are not the first words in sentences. They usually have the second position after the first part of a sentence. If more than one clitic occurs in a sentence, the order is the following:

- The conjunction -li (if) – used predominantly in literary styles
- Auxiliary verbs in preterite (past tense) – jsem, jsi, jsme, jste; and conditionals – bych, bys, by, bychom, byste
- The short form of the reflexive pronoun – si, se
- The short form of personal pronouns in dative – mi, ti, mu,
- The short form of personal pronouns in accusative – mě, tě, ho, tu, to

=== Examples ===
- Prohlížel jsem si ho. – I was looking at him. (I was studying him.)

((null-S) looked (V) at (aux. verb) myself (dat.) him (accus.).)

- Já jsem si ho prohlížel. – I was looking at him.

(I (S) am (aux. verb) myself (dat.) him (accus.) looked (V).)

- Budeš-li se pilně učit ... – If you learn (study) hard ...

((null-S) Will (aux. verb) if yourself (accus.) diligently teach (V).)

== See also ==
- Czech alphabet
- Czech declension
- Czech language
- Czech orthography
- Czech phonology
- Czech verb
