= Czech phonology =

This article discusses the phonological system of the Czech language.

== Consonants ==
=== Consonant chart ===
The following chart shows a complete list of the consonant phonemes of Czech:

		Labial	Alveolar	Palatal	Velar	Glottal
Nasal		m	n	ɲ		
Plosive	voiceless	p	t	c	k	
Plosive	voiced	b	d	ɟ	ɡ	
Affricate	voiceless		t͡s	t͡ʃ		
Affricate	voiced		(d͡z)	d͡ʒ		
Fricative	voiceless	f	s	ʃ	x	
Fricative	voiced	v	z	ʒ		ɦ
Trill	plain		r			
Trill	fricative		r̝			
Approximant			l	j		

Phonetic notes:

- Sibilants /ʃ ʒ t͡ʃ d͡ʒ/ are laminal post-alveolars (usually not considered retroflex).
- The approximant /l/ is mainly pronounced apico-alveolar, although a velarized pronunciation without a firm tongue tip contact is not unusual.
- Both /r/ and /r̝/ are trills though commonly realized with a single contact.
- The phoneme /r̝/, written ⟨ř⟩, is a raised alveolar non-sonorant trill. Its rarity makes it difficult to produce for most foreign learners of Czech, who may pronounce it as [rʒ]; however, it contrasts with /rʒ/ as well as /ʒr/. For example, the words ržát [rʒaːt] ('to neigh') & žrát [ʒraːt] ('to eat [of animals]'), are both pronounced differently from řád [r̝aːt] ('order'). The basic realization of this phoneme is voiced, but it is voiceless [r̝̊] when preceded or followed by a voiceless consonant or at the end of a word. Phonetically, the sound /r̝/ is a period of friction interrupted at the beginning by a contact or contacts created by a retracted apico-alveolar gesture.
- Sonorants /r/, /l/ become syllabic between two consonants or after a consonant at the end of a word.
- /t/ and /d/ can be pronounced as dental stops. While /d/ is commonly realized as apico-alveolar, /t/ is more likely to be laminal denti-alveolar.
- /c/ and /ɟ/ are alveolo-palatal with primarily lamino-alveolar/postalveolar and lateral dorso-palatal contact.
- /ɲ/ is alveolo-palatal nasal.
- The voiceless realization of the phoneme /ɦ/ is velar [x].

=== Glottal stop ===
The glottal stop is not a separate phoneme. Its use is optional and it may appear as the onset of an otherwise vowel-initial syllable. The pronunciation with or without the glottal stop does not affect the meaning and is not distinctive.

The glottal stop has two functions in Czech:

- The emphasis on the boundaries between words or in compound words is usually inserted between two vowels which do not form a diphthong, e.g. zneužívat [znɛʔuʒiːvat] ('to abuse'), táta a máma [taːta ʔa maːma] ('dad and mum'); it is also inserted before initial vowels of the second part of compound words, e.g. trojúhelník [trojʔuːɦɛlɲiːk] ('triangle'). This usage of the glottal stop is usual in Bohemia. Pronunciation without it is typical of Moravian regions, e.g. [znɛuʒiːvat], [trojuːɦɛlɲiːk], [zokna]. Both variants are regarded as correct.
- Certain words can be emphasized by the use of the glottal stop.

In the standard pronunciation, the glottal stop is never inserted between two consecutive vowels without an intervening morpheme boundary, which occurs chiefly in words of foreign origin, e.g. in the word koala.

=== Marginal consonant phonemes ===
The phonemes /f/, /g/, /d͡ʒ/ and /d͡z/ usually occur in words of foreign origin (Germanic, Romance or Greek) or dialects only. As for /f/, however, the number of words where it occurs is still significant and many of them are commonplace, e.g. fialový ('violet'), fronta ('queue' as a noun), fotit ('take photos'), doufat ('hope' as a verb). It is also used in common first names (František, Filip) and surnames (Fiala, Fišer). The phoneme /g/, though rarer than /f/, appears in frequently used words as well, e.g. graf ('graph'), gram ('gram'), grep ('grapefruit'), regulace ('regulation'). The occurrence of /d͡ʒ/ is uncommon and typically signals that the word is of English origin (e.g. džíny ← jeans), but not always (e.g. džbán ← older čbán 'jug'). The phoneme /d͡z/ is quite marginal, used mostly by dialects spoken near the border with Slovakia (see Slovak phonology).

Nevertheless, as phonemic realizations [f], [g], [d͡ʒ] and [d͡z] all four consonants also occur as allophones of /v/, /k/, /t͡ʃ/ and /t͡s/ respectively due to assimilation of voice. Moreover, affricates can phonetically occur at morpheme boundaries (see consonant merging below).

=== Consonants in the script ===
Other consonants are represented by the same characters (letters) as in the IPA.

IPA	Czech alphabet
/ʃ/	š
/ʒ/	ž
/ɲ/	ň
/c/	ť
/ɟ/	ď
/ɦ/	h
/x/	ch
/t͡s/	c
/t͡ʃ/	č
/d͡ʒ/	dž
/r̝/	ř

=== Consonant assimilation ===
Realizations of consonant phonemes are influenced by their surroundings. The position of phonemes in words can modify their phonetic realizations without a change of the meaning.

==== Assimilation of the place of articulation ====
- Labiodental [ɱ] is a realization of /m/ before labiodental fricatives /f/ and /v/, e.g. in the word tramvaj [traɱvaj] ('tram').
- Velar [ŋ] is a realization of /n/ before velar stops /k/ and /ɡ/, e.g. in the word banka [baŋka] ('bank').

The former assimilation is optional while the latter is obligatory. Realization of the former as [tramvaj] is thus possible, especially in more prestigious registers, whereas realization of the latter as [banka] is considered hypercorrect, and hence incorrect.

==== Assimilation of voice ====
Assimilation of voice is an important feature of Czech pronunciation. Voiced obstruents are, in certain circumstances, realized voiceless and vice versa. It is not represented in orthography, where more etymological principles are applied. Assimilation of voice applies in these circumstances:

- In consonant groups – all obstruents in the group are realized either voiced or voiceless. It is mostly governed by the last consonant in the group (regressive assimilation), e.g. roztok [rostok] ('solution').
- Voiced obstruents are realized voiceless in the pre-pausal position (final devoicing). Compare led [lɛt] ('ice') – ledu [lɛdu] ('ice' gen.) vs. let [lɛt] ('flight') – letu [lɛtu] ('flight' gen.) – the nominative forms of both words (led – let) are pronounced the same due to final devoicing in the first; but in the other inflection forms their pronunciation differs.

Voiced and voiceless obstruents form pairs in which the assimilation of voice applies (see table):

Voiceless	Voiced
[p]	[b]
[t]	[d]
[c]	[ɟ]
[k]	[ɡ]
[f]	[v]
[s]	[z]
[ʃ]	[ʒ]
[x]	[ɦ]
[t͡s]	[d͡z]
[t͡ʃ]	[d͡ʒ]
[r̝̊]	[r̝]

Sonorants (/m/, /n/, /ɲ/, /j/, /r/ and /l/) have no voiceless counterparts and are never devoiced. They do not cause the voicing of voiceless consonants in standard pronunciation, e.g. sledovat [slɛdovat] ('to watch').

There are some exceptions to the rules described above:

- The phoneme /v/ also does not cause the voicing of preceding voiceless consonants (that is, it acts as a sonorant before vowels), e.g. světlo [svjɛtlo] ('light'). However, /v/ followed by a voiceless consonant is also realized voiceless, e.g. vsadit [fsaɟɪt] ('to bet').
- The phonemes /x/ (written ⟨ch⟩) and /ɦ/ (written ⟨h⟩) form a special voice pair even though the places of articulation differ, e.g. vrh [vrx] ('a throw') – vrhu [vrɦu] ('a throw' gen.). The phoneme /x/ followed by a voiced obstruent can be realized as either [ɦ] or [ɣ], e.g. abych byl [abɪɣ.bɪl] ('so that I would...'). The phoneme /ɦ/ undergoes progressive assimilation after /s/ in Bohemian pronunciation, e.g. na shledanou [na sxlɛdanou̯] ('goodbye'), whereas standard regressive assimilations are typical of Moravian pronunciation, [na zɦlɛdanou̯].
- The phoneme /r̝/ does not cause assimilations of adjacent consonants, but it undergoes progressive as well as regressive assimilation according to its surroundings, e.g. při [pr̝̊ɪ] ('by'). Its basic realization is voiced. In final position, it is voiceless.

==== Consonant merging ====
Two identical consonant phonemes (or allophones) can meet in morpheme boundaries during word formation. In many cases, especially in suffixes, two identical consonant sounds merge into one sound in pronunciation, e.g. cenný [t͡sɛniː] ('valuable'), měkký [mɲɛkiː] ('soft').

In prefixes and composite words, lengthened or doubled pronunciation (gemination) is obvious. It is necessary in cases of different words: nejjasnější [nɛjjasɲɛjʃiː] ('the clearest') vs. nejasnější [nɛjasɲɛjʃiː] ('more unclear'). Doubled pronunciation is perceived as hypercorrect in cases like [t͡sɛnniː] or [mɲɛkkiː].

Combinations of stops (/d/, /t/, /ɟ/, /c/) and fricatives (/s/, /z/, /ʃ/, /ʒ/) usually produce affricates ([t͡s, d͡z, t͡ʃ, d͡ʒ]): dětský [ɟɛt͡skiː] ("children's"). Both phonemes are pronounced separately in careful pronunciation: [ɟɛt.skiː].

== Vowels ==
There are 10 monophthongal and 3 diphthongal vowel phonemes in Czech: /iː ɪ ɛː ɛ aː a oː o uː u eu̯ au̯ ou̯/. Czech is a quantity language: it differentiates five vowel qualities that occur as both phonologically short and long. The short and long counterparts generally do not differ in their quality, although long vowels may be more peripheral than short vowels.

As for the high front vowel pair /iː/–/i/, there are dialectal differences with respect to phonetic realisation of the contrast: in the Bohemian variety of Czech, the two vowels are differentiated by both quality and duration, while in the Eastern Moravian variety of Czech the primary difference is that of duration. Therefore, in the Bohemian variety, the transcription [iː]–[ɪ] more accurately reflects the tradeoff between the qualitative and the durational difference in these vowels, while in the Eastern Moravian variety of Czech, the transcription [iː]–[i] captures the primary durational difference.

Besides length, Czech differentiates three degrees of height and three degrees of backness.

Vowel length and quality is independent of the stress.

Czech vowel chart, based on Dankovičová (1999:72)

=== Short vowels ===
/ɪ/ is spelled i and y
/ɛ/ is spelled e and ě
/a/ is spelled a
/o/ is spelled o
/u/ is spelled u

=== Long vowels ===
Long vowels are indicated by an acute accent (čárka) or a ring (kroužek).

/iː/ is spelled í and ý
/ɛː/ is spelled é
/aː/ is spelled á
/oː/ is spelled ó (this phoneme occurs almost exclusively in words of foreign origin)
/uː/ is spelled ú and ů with the former only used when it is the first letter of an unbound morpheme, as well as in loanwords and onomatopoeia and the latter in the middle.

=== Diphthongs ===
/au̯/ is spelled au (occurs almost exclusively in words of foreign origin)
/eu̯/ is spelled eu (occurs in words of foreign origin only)
/ou̯/ is spelled ou

The phonemes /o/ and /oː/ are sometimes transcribed /ɔ/ and /ɔː/. This transcription describes the pronunciation in Central Bohemia and Prague, which is more open. The standard pronunciation is something between [o(ː)] and [ɔ(ː)], i.e. mid back vowel.

The informal Bohemian pronunciation of /ɛ/ also tends to be opener, getting close to /a/ (e.g. nemáme /namaːma/), whereas in Moravia, it is more closed, more like /ɪ/ (e.g. neseme /nɪsɪmɪ/).

The letter ě is not a separate vowel. It denotes /ɛ/ after a palatal stop or palatal nasal (e.g. něco /ɲɛtso/), /ɲɛ/ after /m/ (e.g. měkký /mɲɛkiː/), and /jɛ/ after other labial consonants (e.g. běs /bjɛs/).

The vowel sequences ia, ie, ii, io, and iu in foreign words are not diphthongs. They are pronounced with an epenthetic /j/ between the vowels: [ɪja, ɪjɛ, ɪjɪ, ɪjo, ɪju].

== Prosody ==
=== Stress ===
The stress is nearly always fixed to the first syllable of a word. Exceptions:

- One-syllable prepositions usually form a unit with following words. Therefore, the stress moves to the prepositions, ˈPraha ('Prague') → ˈdo Prahy ('to Prague'). This rule is not always applied in words which have four or more syllables: e.g. either ˈna koloˌnádě or na ˈkoloˌnádě ('on the colonnade') are possible.
- Some one-syllable words (e.g. mi ('me'), ti ('you'), to ('it'), se, si ('oneself'), jsem ('am'), jsi ('are'), etc.) are clitics — they are not stressed and form a unit with preceding words, therefore they cannot be the first words in (standard) sentences. Example: ˈNapsal jsem ti ten ˈdopis ('I have written the letter to you'). (See Czech word order for details.)

Long words can have the secondary stress which is mostly placed on every odd syllable, e.g. ˈnej.krás.ˌněj.ší ('the most beautiful'). However, in some cases it can be placed on the fourth syllable, e.g. ˈnej.ze.le.ˌněj.ší ('the greenest').

The stress has no lexical or phonological function; it denotes boundaries between words but does not distinguish word meanings. It has also no influence on the quality or quantity of vowels, i.e. the vowels are not reduced in unstressed syllables and can be both short and long regardless of the stress. Thus, the Czech rhythm can be considered as isosyllabic.

=== Intonation ===
Czech is not a tonal language. Tones or melodies are not lexical distinctive features. However, intonation is a distinctive feature on the level of sentences. Tone can differentiate questions from simple messages, as it need not necessarily be indicated by the word order:

On to udělal ('he did it')
On to udělal? ('did he do it?')
On to udělal?! ('he did it?!')

All these sentences have the same lexical and grammatical structure. The differences are in their intonation.

=== Phonotactics ===
Open syllables of type CV are the most abundant in Czech texts. It is supposed that all syllables were open in the Proto-Slavic language. Syllables without consonant onset occur with a relatively little frequency. The usage of the glottal stop as an onset in such syllables confirms this tendency in the pronunciation of Bohemian speakers. In Common Czech, the most widespread Czech interdialect, prothetic v– is added to all words beginning with o– in standard Czech, e.g. voko instead of oko (eye).

The general structure of Czech syllables is:

(C)(C)(C)(C)(C)V(C)(C)(C)

C – consonant
V – vowel or syllabic consonant

Thus, Czech words can have up to five consonants in the initial group (e.g., vzkvět [ˈfskvjɛt]) and three consonants in the final group (not including syllabic consonants). The syllabic nucleus is usually formed by vowels or diphthongs, but in some cases syllabic sonorants (/r/ and /l/, rarely also /m/ and /n/) can be found in the nucleus, e.g. vlk [vl̩k] ('wolf'), krk [kr̩k] ('neck'), osm [osm̩] ('eight').

Vowel groups can occur in the morpheme boundaries. They cannot include more than two vowels. Both vowels in the groups are separate syllabic nuclei and do not form diphthongs.

== Morphophonology ==
Phoneme alternations in morphophonemes (changes which do not affect morpheme meaning) are frequently applied in inflections and derivations. They are divided into vowel and consonant alternations. Both types can be combined in a single morpheme:

- kniha /ˈkɲɪɦa/ [ˈkɲɪɦa] ('book')
- v knize /ˈvkɲɪzɛ/ [ˈfkɲɪzɛ] ('in a book')
- knížka /ˈkɲiːʒka/ [ˈkɲiːʃka] ('little book')

=== Vowel alternations ===
The most important alternations are those of short and long phonemes. Some of these alternations are correlative, i.e. the phonemes in pairs differ in their length only. Due to historical changes in some phonemes (/oː/ → /uː/, /uː/ → /ou̯/, similar to the Great Vowel Shift in English), some alternations are disjunctive, i.e. the phonemes in pairs are different in more features. These alternations occur in word roots during inflections and derivations, and they also affect prefixes in derivations.

Short phoneme	Long phoneme	Examples, notes
/a/	/aː/	zakladatel ('founder') – zakládat ('to found')
/ɛ/	/ɛː/	letadlo ('airplane') – létat ('to fly')
/ɪ/	/iː/	litovat ('to be sorry') – lítost ('regret') vykonat ('to perform') – výkon ('performance')
/o/	/uː/	koně ('horses') – kůň ('horse')
/u/	/uː/	učesat ('to comb') – účes ('hair style') (in initial positions in morphemes only)
/u/	/ou̯/	kup! ('buy!') – koupit ('to buy') (in other positions)

Some other disjunctive vowel alternations occur in word roots during derivations (rarely also during inflections):

- |a/ɛ|: šťastný ('happy') – štěstí ('happiness'); vejce ('egg') – vajec ('eggs' gen.)
- |ɛ/o|: veze ('is carrying') – vozí ('carries')
- |aː/iː|: hřát ('to warm') – zahřívat ('to warm up')
- |aː/ɛ|: otřást ('to shake') – otřes ('tremor')
- |aː/o|: vyrábět ('to produce') – výroba ('production')
- |ɛ/iː|: zaječice ('doe') – zajíc ('hare')

Emergence/disappearance alternations also take place, i.e. vowels alternate with null phonemes. In some allomorphs, /ɛ/ is inserted between consonants as a result of Havlík's law:

- |ɛ/∅|: matka ('mother') – matek ('mothers' gen.); lež ('lie') – lži ('lies')

It also occurs in some prepositions which have vocalised positional variants: v domě – ('in a house') – ve vodě ('in water'); s tebou ('with you') – se mnou ('with me'), etc.

Some other alternations of this type occur, but they are not so frequent:

- |ɪ/∅|: vypsat ('to write out') – výpis ('abstract')
- |iː/∅|: vytknout ('to reproach once') – vytýkat ('to reproach'); ubrat ('to take away once') – ubírat ('to take away') (examples of verb pairs with perfective and imperfective aspects)
- |u/∅|: suchý ('dry') – schnout ('to become dry')

=== Consonant alternation ===
Alternations of hard and soft consonants represent the most abundant type. They occur regularly in word-stem final consonants before certain suffixes (in derivations) and endings (in inflections). Hard consonants are softened if followed by soft /ɛ/ (written ⟨e/ě⟩), /ɪ/, or /iː/ (written ⟨i⟩ and ⟨í⟩, not ⟨y⟩ and ⟨ý⟩). These changes also occur before some other suffixes (e.g. -ka). Softening can be both correlative and disjunctive.

Hard	Soft	Examples, notes
/d/	/ɟ/	mladý (young – masc. sg.) – mladí ('young' masc. anim. pl.)
/t/	/c/	plat ('wages') – platit ('to pay')
/n/	/ɲ/	žena ('woman') – ženě ('woman' dat.)
/r/	/r̝̊/	dobrý ('good') – dobře ('well')
/s/	/ʃ/	učesat ('to comb') – učešu ('I will comb')
/z/	/ʒ/	ukázat ('to show') – ukážu ('I will show')
/t͡s/	/t͡ʃ/	ovce ('sheep') – ovčák ('shepherd')
/ɡ/	/ʒ/	Riga ('Riga') – rižský ('from Riga')
/ɡ/	/z/	v Rize ('in Riga')
/ɦ/	/ʒ/	Praha ('Prague') – Pražan ('Prague citizen')
/ɦ/	/z/	v Praze ('in Prague')
/x/	/ʃ/	prach ('dust') – prášit ('to raise dust')
/x/	/s/	smíchat ('to mix') – směs ('mixture')
/k/	/t͡ʃ/	vlk ('wolf') – vlček ('little wolf')
/k/	/t͡s/	vlci ('wolves')
/sk/	/ʃc/	britský ('British' – masc. sg.) – britští ('British' – masc. anim. pl.)
/t͡sk/	/t͡ʃc/	anglický ('English') – angličtina ('English language')
/b/	/bj/	nádoba ('vessel') – v nádobě ('in a vessel') bílý ('white') – bělásek ('cabbage white butterfly')
/p/	/pj/	zpívat ('to sing') – zpěvák ('singer')
/v/	/vj/	tráva ('grass') – na trávě ('on the grass') vím ('I know') – vědět ('to know')
/f/	/fj/	harfa ('harp') – na harfě ('on the harp')
/m/	/mɲ/	dům ('house') – v domě ('in a house') smích ('laughter') – směšný ('laughable')

The last five examples are emergence alternations. A phoneme (/j/ or /ɲ/) is inserted in the pronunciation, but for the historical reasons, these changes are indicated by ⟨ě⟩ in the orthography (see the orthographic notes below). These alternations are analogical with softening alternations, therefore they are mentioned here. They also occur in word roots together with vowel alternations (usually |ɛ/iː|).

Some other alternations occur but they are not so frequent. They are often less evident:

- |p/∅|: topit se – tonout ('to be drowning' – both words)
- |b/∅|: zahýbat ('to be turning') – zahnout ('to take a turn')
- |v/∅|: vléct ('to carry') – obléct ('to dress')

=== Orthographic notes ===
In some letter groups, phonological principles of the Czech orthography are broken:

Voiced plosive	Voiceless plosive	Nasal
dy [dɪ]	ty [tɪ]	ny [nɪ]
dý [diː]	tý [tiː]	ný [niː]
di [ɟɪ]	ti [cɪ]	ni [ɲɪ]
dí [ɟiː]	tí [ciː]	ní [ɲiː]
dě [ɟɛ]	tě [cɛ]	ně [ɲɛ]
bě [bjɛ] vě [vjɛ]	pě [pjɛ] fě [fjɛ]	mě [mɲɛ]

== Sample ==
The sample text is a reading of the first sentence of The North Wind and the Sun by a native speaker of Common Czech, who is from Prague.

=== Phonemic transcription ===
/ˈsɛvɛraːk a ˈslunt͡sɛ sɛ ˈɦaːdalɪ | ɡdo ˈz ɲix jɛ ˈsɪlɲɛjʃiː/

=== Phonetic transcription ===
[ˈsɛvɛraːk a ˈsɫunt͡sɛ sɛ ˈɦaːdaɫɪ | ɡdo ˈz ɲix jɛ ˈsɪɫɲɛjʃiː]

=== Orthographic version ===
Severák a Slunce se hádali, kdo z nich je silnější.

== See also ==
- Czech alphabet
- Czech declension
- Czech language
- Czech orthography
- Czech verb
- History of the Czech language

== Bibliography ==
- Čermák, František (2004), Jazyk a jazykověda, Prague: Karolinum Press, ISBN 80-246-0154-0
- Dankovičová, Jana (1999), "Czech", Handbook of the International Phonetic Association: A guide to the use of the International Phonetic Alphabet, Cambridge: Cambridge University Press, pp. 70–74, ISBN 0-521-65236-7
- Duběda, Tomáš (2005), Univerzálie a typologie ve fonetice a fonologii, Prague: Karolinum Press, ISBN 80-246-1073-6
- Karlík, Petr; Nekula, Marek; Pleskalová, Jana (2002), Encyklopedický slovník češtiny, Prague: Nakladatelství Lidové noviny, ISBN 80-7106-484-X
- Karlík, Petr; Nekula, Marek; Rusínová, Zdeňka (1995), Příruční mluvnice češtiny, Prague: Nakladatelství Lidové noviny, ISBN 80-7106-134-4
- Kučera, Henry (1961), The Phonology of Czech, 's-Gravenhage: Mouton & Co.
- Šimáčková, Šárka; Podlipský, Václav Jonáš; Chládková, Kateřina (2012), "Czech spoken in Bohemia and Moravia" (PDF), Journal of the International Phonetic Association, 42 (2): 225–232, doi:10.1017/S0025100312000102
- Šiška, Zbyněk (2005), Fonetika a fonologie (2nd ed.), Olomouc: Univerzita Palackého v Olomouci, ISBN 80-244-1044-3
