= Orthographia bohemica =

15-century codification of Czech orthography by Jan Hus

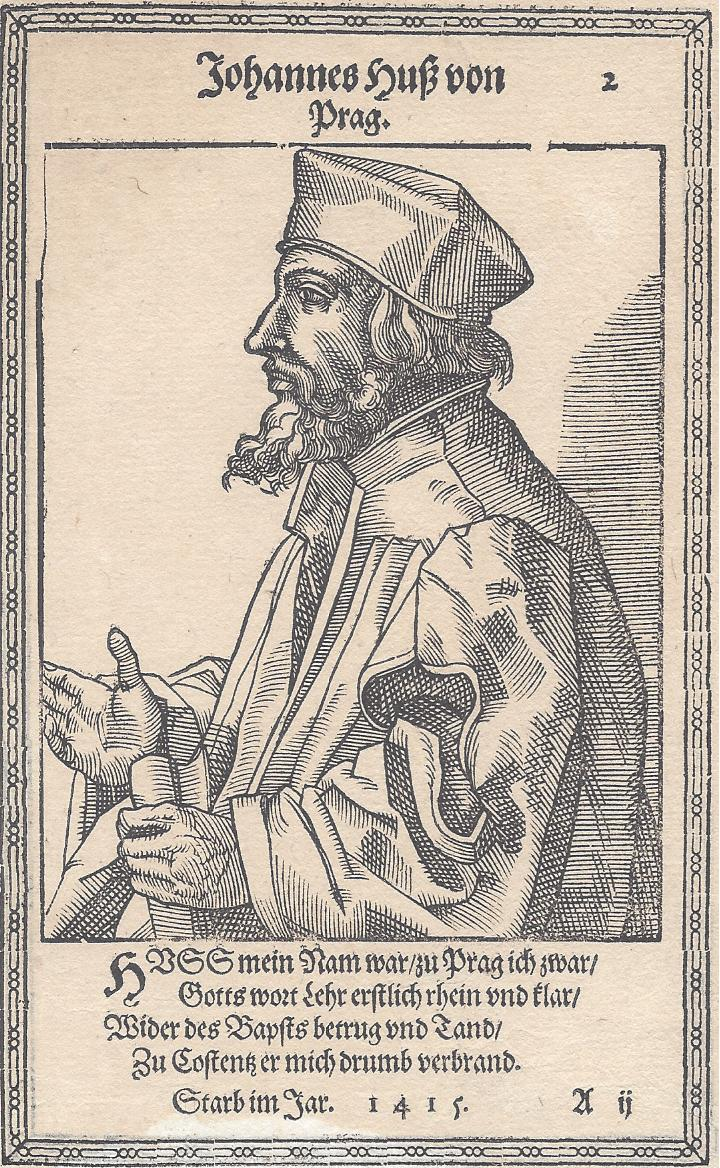
Jan Hus, regarded as the author

De orthographia bohemica (English: On Bohemian Orthography) is a Latin work published between 1406 and 1412. It is attributed to Charles University rector and reformer Jan Hus. The book codified the Czech language's modern spelling and orthography and had decisive impact on the orthography of a number of other European languages.

Orthographia bohemica was the first known document in which spelling reforms were suggested for a Slavic language. It introduced, among other reforms, the precursors to the diacritic signs ´ and ˇ which are now besides Czech used in the Baltic languages Lithuanian and Latvian, in other Slavic languages like Croatian, Slovak, Slovenian and partly Polish, and in several other European languages.

== Provenance ==
Literacy in native languages became also one of the chief projects for the Czech Reformation including the first Hussites but especially for their later Unity of the Brethren branch with their bishop Comenius. While the author's identity and the precise date of authorship are unknown, it is widely held that the author is Jan Hus and the year of creation somewhere between 1406 and 1412, based on historical and philological studies.

== Contents ==
The primary purpose of De orthographia bohemica was to simplify and unify Czech orthography in order to promote literacy by making the language "clearer and easier" to read and write. Instead of representing sounds using digraphs and trigraphs, it proposed a "diacritic orthography", where one letter indicates only one sound, and different but related sounds (such as those now represented by r and ř) are distinguished by diacritics. Briefly, one can summarize the spelling changes in Orthographia Bohemica as follows:

- The basic letters of the Latin alphabet (as well as the Latin digraph ch) were to be used for writing Czech, with sound values according to the conventions of medieval Latin pronunciation in Bohemia at the time. The only difference was that the letter c was always to be used to represent the sound /ts/, and never for /k/. d represented /d/ as in Latin, and the letter g before e and i represented /j/; in other cases g represented /ɡ/.

Ě	ě
Í	í
Ť	ť

- Czech consonants that Latin did not possess would be represented by a Latin letter adorned with a diacritic dot. In particular, as Czech additionally possessed palatalized consonants and a hard l, the dot indicated softness above n, d, t, c and z, and hardness for l.
- Long vowels (which Latin possessed but did not indicate) were to be indicated by the čárka (an acute accent) above a, e, i and y.

To illustrate the simple and revolutionary nature of this spelling, take as an example the various ways of representing ř, compared with that seen in the grammar of Jan Gebauer. In manuscripts written before Hus, all of the following representations were in use: rz, rrz, rs, rzs, rzss, zr, sr, rzs and rzz. Long vowels were written either with no indication of the length, or written double (sometimes with the second letter written in superscript), or with any of a wide and unstandardized range of diacritical marks. One could not even assume that the same scribe would consistently use their own conventions, and their use often varied even within a single manuscript.

== Significance and impact ==
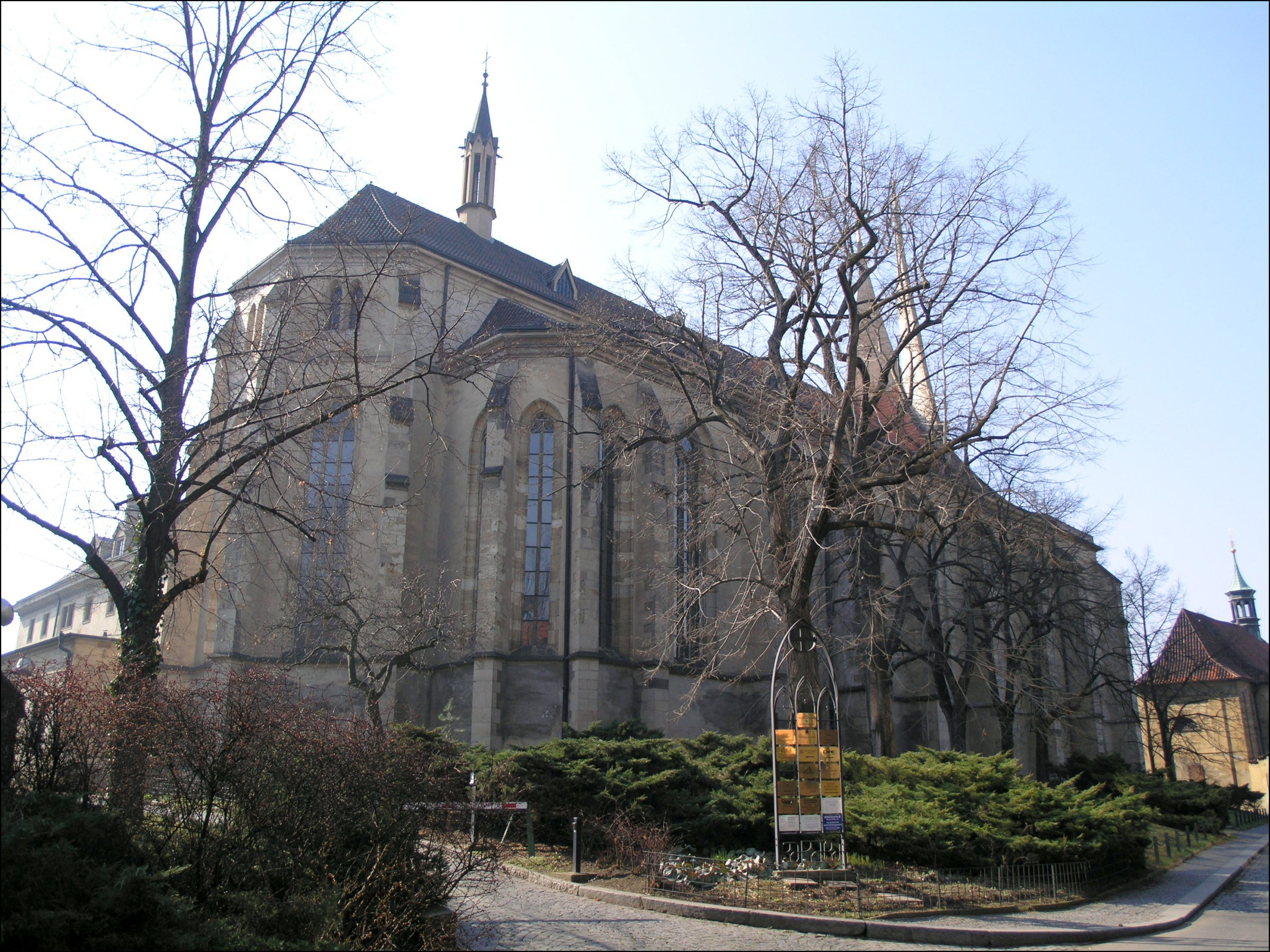
Emmaus Monastery in Prague was the only monastery in the kingdom using the historic Slavic Glagolitic script during the later Middle Ages

Orthographia bohemica was the first known document in which such spelling reforms were suggested for a Slavic language. It is not yet fully clear where Jan Hus drew inspiration for this work. Considered in the context of the contemporaneous study of letters of St. Jerome by Danish scholars of Hebrew working at the Sorbonne, there was a good knowledge of such orthographic practices at the time (particularly the designation of long vowels). According to a study by F. V. Mareš, a stimulus for the project was the author's knowledge of Glagolitic, used by Croatian monks in the Emmaus Monastery (Na Slovanech) in Prague.

The significance of the document lies in the longevity and wide application of its logical system of diacritics. Its impact is apparent in the Grāmatyka Cžeſka w dwogij ſtránce, the first grammar of the Czech language, published in 1533, but the adoption of the new rules was relatively slow and far from uniform. Throughout the 16th century, some printers and typesetters ignored the prescriptions of Orthographia bohemica and continued to maintain some digraphs (e.g. ss for /ʃ/ instead of š), although their use became considerably more uniform. In addition, scribes adopted the new rules much more slowly than book printers.

== Discovery and publication ==
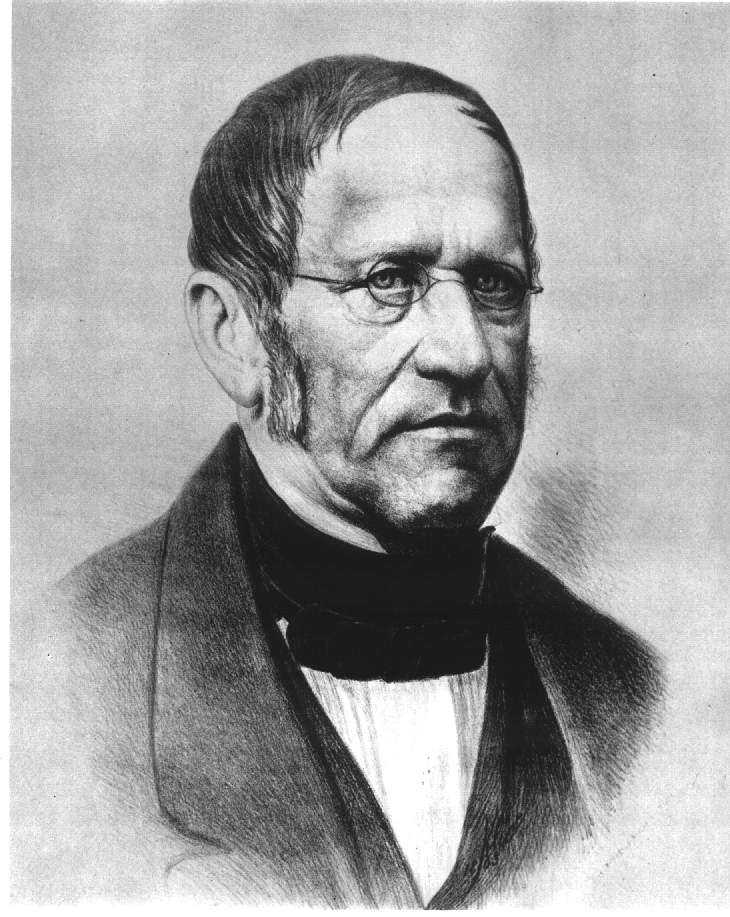
František Palacký who found the original manuscript

The manuscript for Orthographia bohemica was found by František Palacký on 13 August 1826, in Třeboň in the south of Bohemia. The public was made aware of the existence of the work a year later, with the first issue of the newly founded journal Časopis společnosti vlastenského Museum v Čechách ("Journal of the Society of the National Museum in Bohemia"), but its publication had to wait a further thirty years. The Latin text with translation appeared in 1857 in Slavische Bibliothek in Vienna thanks to A. V. Šembera, who worked at the time at the university as Professor of Czech Language and Literature. A year later in Prague, the fifth volume of Mistra Jana Husi sebrané spisy ("Collected Works of Master Jan Hus") appeared with a Czech translation and a short introduction by Václav Flajšhans, to date the latest Czech translation of this manuscript. The Latin text was published twice more: first in the unaltered Šembera edition by Slavische Bibliothek (Amsterdam, 1965) and second with a German translation and commentary by J. Schröpfer in Wiesbaden, Germany in 1968.

Šembera's Latin text was probably taken directly from Palacký's copy of the manuscript; Schröpfer produced a new revised (though not flawless) edition of the manuscript. A critical evaluation comparing the preserved Třeboň manuscript with the extant excerpts has yet to appear.

== Preserved manuscripts ==
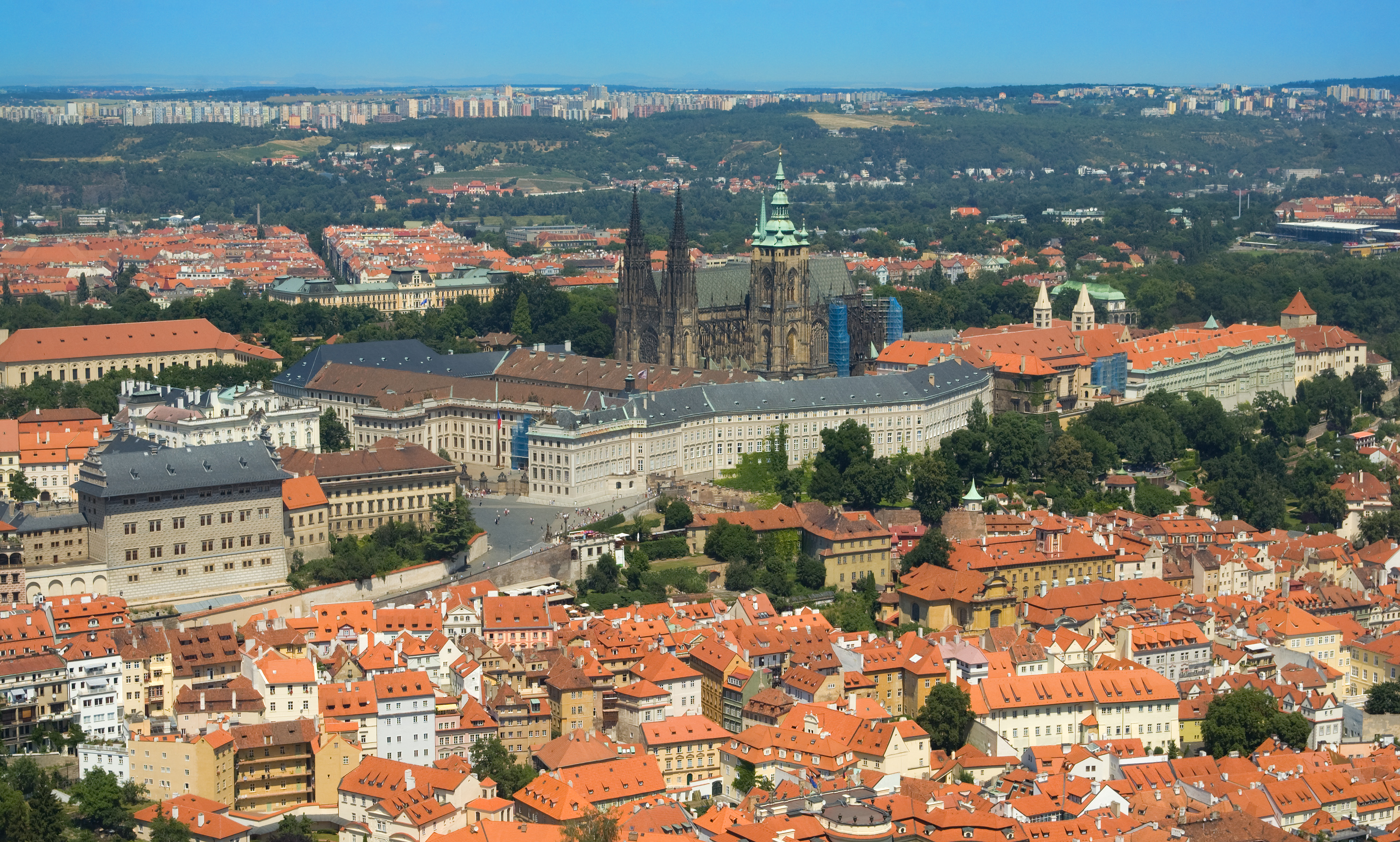
Prague Castle, location of the remaining excerpts

A manuscript of Orthographia bohemica in Jan Hus' hand has still not been found; the only complete copy of the manuscript which is available for study was written by Crux of Telč (Kříž z Telče), an Augustinian canon in Třeboň (i.e. the copy found by Palacký). Its age can not be accurately determined as the copy is not dated. The end of the manuscript contains the inscription In die Leonardi, i.e. on January 6; however, this may indicate either the date of completion of the original manuscript or Crux's copy. In the same volume as Orthographia bohemica, however, are some more works: three of them bear the year 1459 and one 1457. The writings are not arranged chronologically, however, and so they serve only as an approximate guide for determining the age of the manuscript.

In addition to the manuscript written by Crux there are various excerpts deposited in the archives of Prague Castle. Anežka Vidmanová's comparative study with the manuscript of Crux of Telč shows that the Třeboň manuscript is unreliable in many places.

== See also ==
- Czech language
- Czech orthography
- Phonemic orthography
- Spelling reform
- Jan Hus
- Josef Jungmann, advocate of the rebirth of written Czech language in the 19th century.

== Sources ==
=== Historical grammars ===
- Gebauer, Jan. Historická mluvnice jazyka českého. Díl I, Hláskosloví. ČSAV, Prague 1963.
- Lamprechtt. Vývoj fonologického systému českého jazyka. Universita J. E. Purkyně, Brno 1966.

=== Orthographia Bohemica ===
- Bartoš, F. M.: K Husovu spisku o českém pravopise, in: Jihočeský sborník historický, Tábor 1949, p. 33-38.
- Hus, Jan (c. 1406–1412). Orthographia Bohemica
- Hus, Jan (1857). Aloys Vojtěch Šembera (ed.). Orthographia Bohemica [Ortografie Česká] (in Latin and Czech). Vienna.
- Hus, Jan. Pravopis český, in: Mistra Jana Husi Sebrané spisy. Svazek V. Spisy české, díl II. Přel. Milan Svoboda, úvody a vysvětlivkami opatřil prof. dr. Václav Flajšhans, Praha 1858, p. 105-113.
- Mareš, František Václav. Emauzské prameny českého diakritického pravopisu, in: Z tradic slovanské kultury v Čechách, Prague 1975, p. 169-172.
- Orthographia Bohemica. Ed. Kateřina Voleková, Czech translation Ondřej Koupil, English translation Marcela Koupilová and David Livingstone. Praha: Akropolis, 2019. ISBN 978-80-7470-234-1
- Palacký, František. Literní zprávy, in: Časopis společnosti vlastenského Museum v Čechách. První roční běh. Svazek první. České Museum, Prague 1827, p. 132-140.
- Schröpfer, Johann. Hussens Traktat „Orthographia Bohemica“ - Die Herkunft des diakritischen Systems in der Schreibung slavischer Sprachen und die Älteste zusammenhängende Beschreibung slavischer Laute. Wiesbaden, 1968.
- Vidmanová, Anežka. Ke spisku Orthographia Bohemica, in: Listy filologické, 1982, p. 75-89.
