= Czech orthography =

Form of the Latin script used to write Czech language

Czech alphabet Česká abeceda
- Script type: Alphabet
- Period: Since Jan Hus' Orthographia bohemica (early 15th century – present)
- Languages: Czech

Related scripts
- Parent systems: Egyptian hieroglyphs: Proto-Sinaitic alphabet; Phoenician alphabet; Greek alphabet; Old Italic scripts; Latin alphabet; Czech alphabet
- Child systems: Slovak alphabet Gaj's Latin alphabet Latvian alphabet

Unicode
- Unicode range: Subset of Latin

Czech orthography is a system of rules for proper orthography in Czech. The earliest form of a separate Latin script specifically designed to suit Czech was devised by Czech theologian and church reformist Jan Hus, the namesake of the Hussite movement, in one of his seminal works, De orthographia bohemica (On Bohemian orthography).

The modern Czech orthographic system is diacritic, having evolved from an earlier system which used many digraphs (although one digraph has been kept – ch). The caron (known as háček in Czech) is added to standard Latin letters to express sounds which are foreign to Latin. The acute accent is used for long vowels.

The Czech orthography is considered the model for many other Balto-Slavic languages using the Latin alphabet; Slovak orthography being its direct revised descendant, while the Croatian Gaj's Latin alphabet and its Slovene alphabet offspring are largely based on it. The Baltic languages, such as Latvian and Lithuanian, are also largely based on it. All of them make use of similar diacritics and also have a similar, usually interchangeable, relationship between the letters and the sounds they are meant to represent.

== Alphabet ==
The Czech alphabet consists of 42 letters.

Czech alphabet
Majuscule forms (uppercase/capital letters)
A	Á	B	C	Č	D	Ď	E	É	Ě	F	G	H	Ch	I	Í	J	K	L	M	N
Ň	O	Ó	P	Q	R	Ř	S	Š	T	Ť	U	Ú	Ů	V	W	X	Y	Ý	Z	Ž
Minuscule forms (lowercase/small letters)
a	á	b	c	č	d	ď	e	é	ě	f	g	h	ch	i	í	j	k	l	m	n
ň	o	ó	p	q	r	ř	s	š	t	ť	u	ú	ů	v	w	x	y	ý	z	ž

Czech alphabet (detail)
Letter		Name	Letter		Name
Uppercase	Lowercase	Name	Uppercase	Lowercase	Name
A	a	á	Ň	ň	eň
Á	á	dlouhé á; á s čárkou	O	o	ó
B	b	bé	Ó	ó (Note: The letters F, G, and Ó represent the sounds /f/, /ɡ/, and /oː/, respectively, which, when not allophones of /v/ and /k/ in the case of the first two, are used almost exclusively in words and names of foreign origin. With the increasing usage of foreign loanwords and foreign terms, they appear fairly commonly in modern Czech.)	dlouhé ó; ó s čárkou
C	c	cé	P	p	pé
Č	č	čé	Q	q	kvé
D	d	dé	R	r	er
Ď	ď	ďé	Ř	ř	eř
E	e	é	S	s	es
É	é	dlouhé é; é s čárkou	Š	š	eš
Ě (Note: The letters Ě, Ů, and Ý never occur at the beginning of a word. Their capitalized forms are used only in all caps or small caps inscriptions, such as newspaper headlines.)	ě	ije; é s háčkem	T	t	té
F	f	ef	Ť	ť	ťé
G	g	gé	U	u	ú
H	h	há	Ú	ú	dlouhé ú; ú s čárkou
Ch	ch	chá	Ů	ů	ů s kroužkem
I	i	í; měkké i	V	v	vé
Í	í	dlouhé í; dlouhé měkké í; í s čárkou; měkké í s čárkou	W	w	dvojité vé
J	j	jé	X	x	iks
K	k	ká	Y	y	ypsilon; krátké tvrdé ý
L	l	el	Ý	ý	dlouhé ypsilon; dlouhé tvrdé ý; ypsilon s čárkou; tvrdé ý s čárkou
M	m	em	Z	z	zet
N	n	en	Ž	ž	žet

The letters Q, W, and X are used exclusively in foreign words, and the former two are respectively replaced with KV and V once the word becomes "naturalized" (assimilated into Czech); the digraphs dz and dž are also used mostly for foreign words and are not considered to be distinct letters in the Czech alphabet.

== Orthographic principles ==
Czech orthography is primarily phonemic (rather than phonetic) because an individual grapheme usually corresponds to an individual phoneme (rather than a sound). However, some graphemes and letter groups are remnants of historical phonemes which were used in the past but have since merged with other phonemes. Some changes in the phonology have not been reflected in the orthography.

Vowels
Grapheme	IPA value	Notes
a	/a/	
á	/aː/	
e	/ɛ/	
é	/ɛː/	
ě	/ɛ/, /ʲɛ/	Marks palatalization of preceding consonant; see usage rules below
i	/ɪ/	Palatalizes preceding ⟨d⟩, ⟨t⟩, or ⟨n⟩; see usage rules below
í	/iː/	Palatalizes preceding ⟨d⟩, ⟨t⟩, or ⟨n⟩; see usage rules below
o	/o/	
ó	/oː/	Occurs mostly in words of foreign origin.
u	/u/	
ú	/uː/	See usage rules below
ů	/uː/	See usage rules below
y	/ɪ/	See usage rules below
ý	/iː/	See usage rules below

Consonants
Grapheme	IPA value	Notes
b	/b/	
c	/t͡s/ (Note: Unofficial ligatures are sometimes used for the transcription of affricates: /ts/, /dz/, /tʃ/, /dʒ/. The actual IPA version supports using two separate letters which can be joined by a tiebar.)	
č	/t͡ʃ/	
d	/d/	Represents /ɟ/ before ⟨i í ě⟩; see below
ď	/ɟ/	
f	/f/	Occurs mostly in words of foreign origin.
g	/ɡ/	Occurs mostly in words of foreign origin.
h	/ɦ/	
ch	/x/	
j	/j/	
k	/k/	
l	/l/	
m	/m/	
n	/n/	Represents /ɲ/ before ⟨i í ě⟩; see below
ň	/ɲ/	
p	/p/	
r	/r/	
ř	/r̝/ (Note: The "long-leg R" ⟨ɼ⟩ is sometimes used to transcribe voiced ⟨ř⟩ (unofficially). This character was withdrawn from the IPA and replaced by the "lower-case R" with the "up-tack" diacritic mark, which denotes "raised alveolar trill".)	
s	/s/	
š	/ʃ/	
t	/t/	Represents /c/ before ⟨i í ě⟩; see below
ť	/c/	
v	/v/	
x	/ks/, /ɡz/	Occurs only in words of foreign origin; pronounced /ɡz/ in words with the prefix 'ex-' before vowels or voiced consonants.
z	/z/	
ž	/ʒ/	

=== Voicing assimilation ===
All the obstruent consonants are subject to voicing (before voiced obstruents except ⟨v⟩) or devoicing (before voiceless consonants and at the end of words); spelling in these cases is morphophonemic (i.e. the morpheme has the same spelling as before a vowel). An exception is the cluster ⟨sh⟩, in which the /s/ is voiced to /z/ only in Moravian dialects, while in Bohemia the /ɦ/ is devoiced to /x/ instead (e.g. shodit /sxoɟɪt/, in Moravia /zɦoɟɪt/). Devoicing /ɦ/ changes its articulation place: it becomes [x]. After unvoiced consonants ⟨ř⟩ is devoiced: for instance, in tři 'three', which is pronounced [tr̝̊ɪ]. Written voiced or voiceless counterparts are kept according to the etymology of the word, e.g. odpadnout [ˈotpadnou̯t] (to fall away) - od- is a prefix; written /d/ is devoiced here because of the following voiceless /p/.

For historical reasons, the consonant [ɡ] is written k in Czech words like kde ('where', < Proto-Slavic *kъdě) or kdo ('who', < Proto-Slavic *kъto). This is because the letter g was historically used for the consonant [j]. The original Slavic phoneme /ɡ/ changed into /h/ in the Old-Czech period. Thus, /ɡ/ is not a separate phoneme (with a corresponding grapheme) in words of domestic origin; it occurs only in foreign words (e.g. graf, gram, etc.).

==== Final devoicing ====
Unlike in English but like German, Dutch and Russian, voiced consonants are pronounced voicelessly in the final position in words. In declension, they are voiced in cases where the words take on endings.

Compare:

led [ˈlɛt] – ledy [ˈlɛdɪ] (ice – ices)
let [ˈlɛt] – lety [ˈlɛtɪ] (flight – flights)

=== "Soft" I and "hard" Y ===
The letters ⟨i⟩ and ⟨y⟩ are both pronounced [ɪ], while ⟨í⟩ and ⟨ý⟩ are both pronounced [iː]. ⟨y⟩ was originally pronounced [ɨ] as in contemporary Polish. However, in the 14th century, this difference in standard pronunciation disappeared, though it has been preserved in some Moravian dialects. In words of native origin "soft" ⟨i⟩ and ⟨í⟩ cannot follow "hard" consonants, while "hard" ⟨y⟩ and ⟨ý⟩ cannot follow "soft" consonants; "neutral" consonants can be followed by either vowel:

Hard and soft consonants
Soft	ž, š, č, ř, c, j, ď, ť, ň
Neutral	b, f, l, m, p, s, v, z
Hard	h, ch, k, r, d, t, n, g

When ⟨i⟩ or ⟨í⟩ is written after ⟨d, t, n⟩ in native words, these consonants are soft, as if they were written ⟨ď, ť, ň⟩. That is, the sounds [ɟɪ, ɟiː, cɪ, ciː, ɲɪ, ɲiː] are written ⟨di, dí, ti, tí, ni, ní⟩ instead of ⟨ďi, ďí, ťi, ťí, ňi, ňí⟩, e.g. in čeština [ˈt͡ʃɛʃcɪna]. The sounds [dɪ, diː, tɪ, tiː, nɪ, niː] are denoted, respectively, by ⟨dy, dý, ty, tý, ny, ný⟩. In words of foreign origin, ⟨di, ti, ni⟩ are pronounced [dɪ, tɪ, nɪ]; that is, as if they were written ⟨dy, ty, ny⟩, e.g. in diktát, dictation.

Historically the letter ⟨c⟩ was hard, but this changed in the 19th century. However, in some words it is still followed by the letter ⟨y⟩: tác (plate) – tácy (plates).

Because neutral consonants can be followed by either ⟨i⟩ or ⟨y⟩, in some cases they distinguish homophones, e.g. být (to be) vs. bít (to beat), mýt (to wash) vs. mít (to have). At school pupils must memorize word roots and prefixes where ⟨y⟩ is written; ⟨i⟩ is written in other cases. Writing ⟨i⟩ or ⟨y⟩ in endings is dependent on the declension patterns.

=== Letter Ě ===
The letter ⟨ě⟩ is a vestige of Old Czech palatalization. The originally palatalizing phoneme /ě/ [ʲɛ] became extinct, changing to [ɛ] or [jɛ], but it is preserved as a grapheme which can never appear in the initial position.

- [ɟɛ, cɛ, ɲɛ] are written ⟨dě, tě, ně⟩ instead of ⟨ďe, ťe, ňe⟩, analogously to ⟨di, ti, ni⟩
- [bjɛ, pjɛ, vjɛ, fjɛ] are usually written ⟨bě, pě, vě, fě⟩ instead of ⟨bje, pje, vje, fje⟩
  - In words like vjezd (entry, drive-in) objem (volume), ⟨bje, vje⟩ are written because in such cases –je- is etymologically preceded by the prefixes v- or ob-
- [mɲɛ] is usually written ⟨mě⟩ instead of ⟨mně⟩, except for morphological reasons in some words (jemný, soft -> jemně, softly)
  - The first-person singular pronouns mě (for the genitive and accusative cases) and mně (for the dative and locative) are homophones [mɲɛ]—see Czech declension

=== Letter Ů ===
There are two ways in Czech to write long [uː]: ⟨ú⟩ and ⟨ů⟩. ⟨ů⟩ cannot occur in an initial position, while ⟨ú⟩ occurs almost exclusively in the initial position or at the beginning of a word root in a compound.

Historically, long ⟨ú⟩ changed into the diphthong ⟨ou⟩ [ou̯] (as also happened in the English Great Vowel Shift with words such as "house"), though not in word-initial position in the prestige form. In 1848 ⟨ou⟩ at the beginning of word-roots was changed into ⟨ú⟩ in words like ouřad to reflect this. Thus, the letter ⟨ú⟩ is written at the beginning of word-roots only: úhel (angle), trojúhelník (triangle), except in loanwords: skútr (scooter).

Meanwhile, historical long ⟨ó⟩ [oː] changed into the diphthong ⟨uo⟩ [ʊo]. As was common with scribal abbreviations, the letter ⟨o⟩ in the diphthong was sometimes written as a ring above the letter ⟨u⟩, producing ⟨ů⟩, e.g. kóň > kuoň > kůň (horse), like the origin of the German umlaut. Later, the pronunciation changed into [uː], but the grapheme ⟨ů⟩ has remained. It never occurs at the beginning of words: dům (house), domů (home, homeward).

The letter ⟨ů⟩ now has the same pronunciation as the letter ⟨ú⟩ (long [uː]), but alternates with a short ⟨o⟩ when a word is inflected (e.g. nom. kůň → gen. koně, nom. dům → gen. domu), thus showing the historical evolution of the language.

=== Agreement between the subject and the predicate ===
The predicate must be always in accordance with the subject in the sentence - in number and person (personal pronouns), and with past and passive participles also in gender. This grammatical principle affects the orthography (see also "Soft" I and "Hard" Y) – it is especially important for the correct choice and writing of plural endings of the participles.

Examples:

Gender	Sg.	Pl.	English
masculine animate	pes byl koupen	psi byli koupeni	a dog was bought/dogs were bought
masculine inanimate	hrad byl koupen	hrady byly koupeny	a castle was bought/castles were bought
feminine	kočka byla koupena	kočky byly koupeny	a cat was bought/cats were bought
neuter	město bylo koupeno	města byla koupena	a town was bought/towns were bought

The mentioned example shows both past (byl, byla ...) and passive (koupen, koupena ...) participles. The accordance in gender takes effect in the past tense and the passive voice, not in the present and future tenses in active voice.

If the complex subject is a combination of nouns of different genders, masculine animate gender is prior to others and the masculine inanimate and feminine genders are prior to the neuter gender.

Examples:

muži a ženy byli - men and women were
kočky a koťata byly - cats and kittens were
my jsme byli (my = we all/men) vs. my jsme byly (my = we women) - we were

Priority of genders:

masculine animate > masculine inanimate & feminine > neuter

== Punctuation ==
The use of the full stop (.), the colon (:), the semicolon (;), the question mark (?) and the exclamation mark (!) is similar to their use in other European languages. The full stop is placed after a number if it stands for ordinal numerals (as in German), e.g. 1. den (= první den) – the 1st day.

The comma is used to separate individual parts in complex-compound sentences, lists, isolated parts of sentences, etc. Its use in Czech is different from English. Subordinate (dependent) clauses must be always separated from their principal (independent) clauses, for instance. A comma is not placed before a (and), i (as well as), ani (nor) and nebo (or) when they connect parts of sentences or clauses in copulative conjunctions (on a same level). It must be placed in non-copulative conjunctions (consequence, emphasis, exclusion, etc.). A comma can, however, occur in front of the word a (and) if the former is part of comma-delimited parenthesis: Jakub, můj mladší bratr, a jeho učitel Filip byli příliš zabráni do rozhovoru. Probírali látku, která bude u zkoušky, a též, kdo na ní bude. A comma also separates subordinate conjunctions introduced by composite conjunctions a proto (and therefore) and a tak (and so).

Examples:

- otec a matka – father and mother, otec nebo matka – father or mother (coordinate relation – no commas)
- Je to pravda, nebo ne? – Is it true, or not? (exclusion)
- Pršelo, a proto nikdo nepřišel. – It was raining, and so no one came. (consequence)
- Já vím, kdo to je. – I know who it is.
- Myslím, že se mýlíš. – I think you are mistaken. (subordinate relation)
- Jak se máš, Anno? – How are you, Anna? (addressing a person)
- Karel IV., římský císař a český král, založil hrad Karlštejn. – Charles IV, Roman Emperor and Bohemian king, founded the Karlštejn Castle. (comma-delimited parenthesis)

Quotation marks. The first one preceding the quoted text is placed to the bottom line:

- Petr řekl: „Přijdu zítra.“ – Peter said: "I'll come tomorrow."

Other types of quotation marks: ‚‘ »«

Apostrophes are used rarely in Czech. They can denote a missing sound in non-standard speech, but it is optional, e.g. řek' or řek (= řekl, he said).

== Capital letters ==
The first word of every sentence and all proper names are capitalized. Special cases are:

- Respect expression – optional: Ty (you sg.), Tvůj (your sg.), Vy (you pl.), Váš (your pl.); Bůh (God), Mistr (Master), etc.
- Headings – The first word is capitalized.
- Cities, towns and villages – All words are capitalized, except for prepositions: Nové Město nad Metují (New-Town-upon-Metuje).
- Geographical or local names – The first word is capitalized, common names as ulice (street), náměstí (square) or moře (sea) are not capitalized: ulice Svornosti (Concordance Street), Václavské náměstí (Wenceslas Square), Severní moře (North Sea). Since 1993, the initial preposition and the first following word are capitalized: lékárna U Černého orla (Black Eagle Pharmacy).
- Official names of institutions – The first word is capitalized: Městský úřad v Kolíně (The Municipal Office in Kolín) vs. městský úřad (a municipal office). In some cases, an initial common name is not capitalized even if it is factually a part of the name: okres Semily (Semily District), náměstí Míru (Peace Square).
- Names of nations and nationality nouns are capitalized: Anglie (England), Angličan (Englishman), Německo (Germany), Němec (German). Adjectives derived from geographical names and names of nations, such as anglický (English – adjective) and pražský (Prague – adjective, e.g. pražské metro, Prague subway), are not. Names of languages are not capitalized: angličtina (English).
- Possessive adjectives derived from proper names are capitalized: Pavlův dům (Paul's house).
- Brands are capitalized as a trademark or company name, but usually not as product names: přijel trabant a několik škodovek but přijelo auto značky Trabant a několik aut značky Škoda, zákaz vjezdu segwayů but zákaz vjezdu vozítek Segway
- If a proper name contains other proper names, the inner proper names keep their orthography: Poslanecká sněmovna Parlamentu České republiky, Kostelec nad Černými lesy, Filozofická fakulta Jihočeské univerzity v Českých Budějovicích

== History ==
In the 9th century, the Glagolitic script was used, during the 11th century it was replaced by Latin script. There are five periods in the development of the Czech Latin-based orthographic system:

Primitive orthography
For writing sounds which are foreign to the Latin alphabet, letters with similar sounds were used. The oldest known written notes in Czech originate from the 11th century. The literature was written predominantly in Latin in this period. Unfortunately, it was very ambiguous at times, with c, for example, being used for c, č, and k.

Digraphic orthography
Various digraphs were used for non-Latin sounds. The system was not consistent and it also did not distinguish long and short vowels. It had some features that Polish orthography has kept, such as cz, rz instead of č, ř, but was still crippled by ambiguities, such as spelling both s and š as s/ss, z and ž as z, and sometimes even c and č both as cz, only distinguishing by context. Long vowels such as á were sometimes (but not always) written double as aa. Other features of the day included spelling j as g and v as w, as the early modern Latin alphabet had not by then distinguished j from i or v from u.

Diacritic orthography
Introduced probably by Jan Hus. Using diacritics for long vowels ("virgula", an acute, "čárka" in Czech) and "soft" consonants ("punctus rotundus", a dot above a letter, which has survived in Polish ż) was suggested for the first time in "De orthographia Bohemica" around 1406. Diacritics replaced digraphs almost completely. It was also suggested that the Prague dialect should become the standard for Czech. Jan Hus is considered to be the author of that work but there is some uncertainty about this.

Brethren orthography
The Bible of Kralice (1579–1593), the first complete Czech translation of the Bible from the original languages by the Czech Brethren, became the model for the literary form of the language. The punctus rotundus was replaced by the caron ("háček"). There were some differences from the current orthography, e.g. the digraph ſſ was used instead of š; ay, ey, au instead of aj, ej, ou; v instead of u (at the beginning of words); w instead of v; g instead of j; and j instead of í (gegj = její, hers). Y was written always after c, s and z (e.g. cizí, foreign, was written cyzý) and the conjunction i (as well as, and) was written y.

Modern orthography
During the period of the Czech National Renaissance (end of the 18th century and the first half of the 19th century), Czech linguists (Josef Dobrovský et al.) codified some reforms in the orthography. These principles have been effective up to the present day. The later reforms in the 20th century mostly referred to introducing loanwords into Czech and their adaptation to the Czech orthography.

== Computer encoding ==
In computing, several different coding standards have existed for this alphabet, among them:

1. ISO 8859-2
2. Windows code page 1250
3. IBM PC code page 852
4. Kamenický brothers or KEYBCS2 on for MS-DOS and on Fidonet.
5. Unicode

== See also ==
- Czech phonology
- Orthographia bohemica
- Czech declension
- Czech verb
- Czech word order
- International Phonetic Alphabet
- Phonemic orthography
- Háček
- Kroužek
- Non-English usage of quotation marks
