= Czech declension =

Aspect of Czech grammar

Czech declension is a complex system of grammatically determined modifications of nouns, adjectives, pronouns and numerals in Czech, one of the Slavic languages. Czech has seven cases: nominative, genitive, dative, accusative, vocative, locative and instrumental, partly inherited from Proto-Indo-European and Proto-Slavic. Some forms of words match in more than one place in each paradigm.

== Nouns ==
There are 14 paradigms of noun declension. The paradigm of nominal declension depends on the gender and the ending in the nominative of the noun.

In Czech the letters d, h, ch, k, n, r and t are considered 'hard' consonants and č, ř, š, ž, c, j, ď, ť, and ň are considered 'soft'. Others are ambiguous, so nouns ending in b, f, l, m, p, s, v and z may take either form.

For nouns in which the stem ends with a consonant group, a floating e is usually inserted between the last two consonants in cases with no ending. Examples:

zámek (N sg, A sg), zámku (G sg, D sg, V sg, L sg), zámkem (I sg), etc. (chateau; lock) – paradigm hrad
karta (N sg), ..., karet (G pl) (card) – paradigm žena

Consonant or vowel alternations in the word-stem are also obvious in some cases, e.g. zámek (N sg) → zámcích (L pl), Věra (N sg) → Věře (D sg), kniha (N sg) → knize (D sg), moucha (N sg) → mouše (D sg), hoch (N sg) → hoši (N pl), kluk (N sg) → kluci (N pl), bůh (N sg) → bozích (L pl), kolega (N sg) → kolezích (L pl), moucha (N sg) → much (G pl), smlouva (N sg) → smluv (G pl), díra (N sg) → děr (G pl), víra (N sg) → věr (G pl), kráva (N sg) → krav (G pl), dvůr (N sg) → dvora (G sg), hnůj (N sg) → hnoje (G sg), sůl (N sg) → soli (G sg), lest (N sg) → lsti (G sg), čest (N sg) → cti (G sg), křest (N sg) → křtu (G sg), mistr (N sg) → mistře (V sg), švec (N sg) → ševce (G sg). See Czech phonology for more details.

=== Masculine animate ===
		Hard	Soft		A-stem	Adjectival
Sg.	1. Nominative	pán	muž	soudce	předseda	mluvčí
Sg.	2. Genitive	pána	muže koně	soudce	předsedy	mluvčího
Sg.	3. Dative	pánovi, pánu	mužovi, muži	soudcovi, soudci	předsedovi	mluvčímu
Sg.	4. Accusative	pána	muže koně	soudce	předsedu	mluvčího
Sg.	5. Vocative	pane! kluku! manželi!	muži! otče!	soudce!	předsedo!	mluvčí!
Sg.	6. Locative	pánovi, pánu	mužovi, muži	soudcovi, soudci	předsedovi	mluvčím
Sg.	7. Instrumental	pánem	mužem koněm	soudcem	předsedou	mluvčím
Pl.	1. Nominative	pánové, páni hosti, hosté manželé, manželové	mužové, muži koně učitelé	soudcové, soudci	předsedové turisté cyklisté, cyklisti	mluvčí
Pl.	2. Genitive	pánů	mužů koní, koňů	soudců	předsedů	mluvčích
Pl.	3. Dative	pánům	mužům koním, koňům	soudcům	předsedům	mluvčím
Pl.	4. Accusative	pány manžele, manžely	muže koně	soudce	předsedy	mluvčí
Pl.	5. Vocative	pánové! páni! hosti! hosté! manželé! manželové!	mužové! muži! koně! učitelé!	soudci! soudcové!	předsedové! turisté! cyklisté!, cyklisti!	mluvčí!
Pl.	6. Locative	pánech klucích manželech, manželích	mužích	soudcích	předsedech kolezích	mluvčích
Pl.	7. Instrumental	pány manželi, manžely	muži koni, koňmi	soudci	předsedy	mluvčími

pán – sir, lord; kluk – boy; host – guest; manžel – husband; muž – man; kůň – horse; učitel – teacher; otec – father; předseda – chairman; turista – tourist; cyklista – cyclist; kolega – colleague; soudce – judge; mluvčí -speaker, spokesman

=== Masculine inanimate ===
		Hard	Soft
Sg.	Nominative	hrad	stroj
Sg.	Genitive	hradu lesa	stroje
Sg.	Dative	hradu	stroji
Sg.	Accusative	hrad	stroj
Sg.	Vocative	hrade! zámku!	stroji!
Sg.	Locative	hradu, hradě lese	stroji
Sg.	Instrumental	hradem	strojem
Pl.	Nominative	hrady	stroje
Pl.	Genitive	hradů	strojů
Pl.	Dative	hradům	strojům
Pl.	Accusative	hrady	stroje
Pl.	Vocative	hrady!	stroje!
Pl.	Locative	hradech zámcích	strojích
Pl.	Instrumental	hrady	stroji

hrad – castle; les – forest; zámek – chateau, lock; stroj – machine

Latin words ending -us are declined according to the paradigm pán (animate) or hrad (inanimate) as if there were no -us ending in the nominative: Brutus, Bruta, Brutovi, Bruta, Brute, Brutovi, Brutem

=== Feminine ===
		Hard	Soft		
Sg.	Nominative	žena	růže	píseň	kost
Sg.	Genitive	ženy	růže	písně postele	kosti
Sg.	Dative	ženě škole	růži	písni	kosti
Sg.	Accusative	ženu	růži	píseň	kost
Sg.	Vocative	ženo!	růže!	písni!	kosti!
Sg.	Locative	ženě škole	růži	písni	kosti
Sg.	Instrumental	ženou	růží	písní	kostí
Pl.	Nominative	ženy	růže	písně postele	kosti
Pl.	Genitive	žen hus, husí	růží ulic	písní	kostí
Pl.	Dative	ženám	růžím	písním	kostem vsím
Pl.	Accusative	ženy	růže	písně postele	kosti
Pl.	Vocative	ženy!	růže!	písně! postele!	kosti!
Pl.	Locative	ženách	růžích	písních	kostech vsích
Pl.	Instrumental	ženami	růžemi	písněmi postelemi dveřmi	kostmi vsemi

žena – woman; škola – school; husa – goose; ulice – street; růže – rose; píseň – song; postel – bed; dveře – door; kost – bone; ves – village

=== Neuter ===
		Hard	Soft	Mixed suffix	Long i-stem
Sg.	Nominative	město	moře	kuře	stavení
Sg.	Genitive	města	moře	kuřete	stavení
Sg.	Dative	městu	moři	kuřeti	stavení
Sg.	Accusative	město	moře	kuře	stavení
Sg.	Vocative	město!	moře!	kuře!	stavení!
Sg.	Locative	městě, městu	moři	kuřeti	stavení
Sg.	Instrumental	městem	mořem	kuřetem	stavením
Pl.	Nominative	města	moře	kuřata	stavení
Pl.	Genitive	měst	moří	kuřat	stavení
Pl.	Dative	městům	mořím	kuřatům	stavením
Pl.	Accusative	města	moře	kuřata	stavení
Pl.	Vocative	města!	moře!	kuřata!	stavení!
Pl.	Locative	městech jablkách, jablcích	mořích	kuřatech	staveních
Pl.	Instrumental	městy	moři	kuřaty	staveními

město – town; jablko – apple; moře – sea; kuře – chicken; stavení – building, house; Latin words ending -um are declined according to the paradigm město: muzeum, muzea, muzeu, muzeum ...

=== Irregular nouns ===
The parts of the body have irregular, originally dual, declension, especially in the plural forms, but only when used to refer to the parts of the body and not in metaphorical contexts. For example, when "noha" (leg) is used to refer to the part of the body, it declines as below, but when used to refer to a leg on a chair or table, it declines regularly (according to žena).

Sg.	Nominative	oko	ucho	rameno	koleno	ruka	noha
Sg.	Genitive	oka	ucha	ramena ramene	kolena kolene	ruky	nohy
Sg.	Dative	oku	uchu	ramenu rameni	kolenu koleni	ruce	noze
Sg.	Accusative	oko	ucho	rameno	koleno	ruku	nohu
Sg.	Vocative	oko!	ucho!	rameno!	koleno!	ruko!	noho!
Sg.	Locative	oku	uchu	ramenu rameni rameně	kolenu koleni koleně	ruce	noze
Sg.	Instrumental	okem	uchem	ramenem	kolenem	rukou	nohou
Pl.	Nominative	oči	uši	ramena	kolena	ruce	nohy
Pl.	Genitive	očí	uší	ramenou ramen	kolenou kolen	rukou	nohou
Pl.	Dative	očím	uším	ramenům	kolenům	rukám	nohám
Pl.	Accusative	oči	uši	ramena	kolena	ruce	nohy
Pl.	Vocative	oči!	uši!	ramena!	kolena!	ruce!	nohy!
Pl.	Locative	očích	uších	ramenou ramenech	kolenou kolenech	rukou rukách	nohou nohách
Pl.	Instrumental	očima	ušima	rameny	koleny	rukama	nohama

oko – eye, ucho – ear, rameno – shoulder, koleno – knee, ruka – hand/arm, noha – foot/leg.

Sg.	Nominative	bůh	člověk	obyvatel	přítel
Sg.	Genitive	boha	člověka	obyvatele	přítele
Sg.	Dative	bohu bohovi	člověku člověkovi	obyvateli obyvatelovi	příteli přítelovi
Sg.	Accusative	boha	člověka	obyvatele	přítele
Sg.	Vocative	bože!	člověče!	obyvateli!	příteli!
Sg.	Locative	bohu bohovi	člověku člověkovi	obyvateli obyvatelovi	příteli přítelovi
Sg.	Instrumental	bohem	člověkem	obyvatelem	přítelem
Pl.	Nominative	bohové bozi	lidé	obyvatelé	přátelé
Pl.	Genitive	bohů	lidí	obyvatelů obyvatel	přátel
Pl.	Dative	bohům	lidem	obyvatelům	přátelům
Pl.	Accusative	bohy	lidi	obyvatele	přátele
Pl.	Vocative	bohové! bozi!	lidé!	obyvatelé!	přátelé!
Pl.	Locative	bozích	lidech	obyvatelích	přátelích
Pl.	Instrumental	bohy	lidmi	obyvateli	přáteli

bůh – god, člověk – person, lidé – people, obyvatel – resident, přítel – friend

Submodels of feminine declension

Sg.	Nominative	dcera	ulice
Sg.	Genitive	dcery	ulice
Sg.	Dative	dceři	ulici
Sg.	Accusative	dceru	ulici
Sg.	Vocative	dcero!	ulice!
Sg.	Locative	dceři	ulici
Sg.	Instrumental	dcerou	ulicí
Pl.	Nominative	dcery	ulice
Pl.	Genitive	dcer	ulic
Pl.	Dative	dcerám	ulicím
Pl.	Accusative	dcery	ulice
Pl.	Vocative	dcery!	ulice!
Pl.	Locative	dcerách	ulicích
Pl.	Instrumental	dcerami	ulicemi

dcera – daughter, ulice – street

Submodels of neuter declension

Sg.	Nominative	vejce	letiště
Sg.	Genitive	vejce	letiště
Sg.	Dative	vejci	letišti
Sg.	Accusative	vejce	letiště
Sg.	Vocative	vejce!	letiště!
Sg.	Locative	vejci	letišti
Sg.	Instrumental	vejcem	letištěm
Pl.	Nominative	vejce	letiště
Pl.	Genitive	vajec	letišť
Pl.	Dative	vejcím	letištím
Pl.	Accusative	vejce	letiště
Pl.	Vocative	vejce!	letiště!
Pl.	Locative	vejcích	letištích
Pl.	Instrumental	vejci	letišti

vejce – egg, letiště – airport

Other cases of special inflection

Sg.	Nominative	loket	dvůr	čest	zeď	loď
Sg.	Genitive	lokte loktu	dvoru dvora	cti	zdi	lodi lodě
Sg.	Dative	lokti loktu	dvoru	cti	zdi	lodi
Sg.	Accusative	loket	dvůr	čest	zeď	loď
Sg.	Vocative	lokte! lokti	dvore!	cti!	zdi!	lodi!
Sg.	Locative	lokti loktu loktě	dvoru dvoře	cti	zdi	lodi
Sg.	Instrumental	loktem	dvorem	ctí	zdí	lodí
Pl.	Nominative	lokty	dvory	cti	zdi	lodi lodě
Pl.	Genitive	loktů	dvorů	ctí	zdí	lodí
Pl.	Dative	loktům	dvorům	ctem	zdem zdím	lodím
Pl.	Accusative	lokty	dvory	cti	zdi	lodi lodě
Pl.	Vocative	lokty!	dvory!	cti	zdi	lodi lodě
Pl.	Locative	loktech	dvorech	ctech	zdech zdích	lodích
Pl.	Instrumental	lokty	dvory	ctmi	zdmi	loďmi loděmi

loket – elbow, dvůr – courtyard, čest – honour, zeď – wall, loď – boat

== Adjective ==
Adjective declension varies according to the gender of the noun which they are related to:

mladý muž (male) – young man
mladá žena (female) – young woman
mladé víno (neuter) – new wine, must

=== Hard declension ===
		Masculine animate	Masculine inanimate	Feminine	Neuter
Sg.	Nominative	mladý		mladá	mladé
Sg.	Genitive	mladého		mladé	mladého
Sg.	Dative	mladému		mladé	mladému
Sg.	Accusative	mladého	mladý	mladou	mladé
Sg.	Vocative	mladý!		mladá!	mladé!
Sg.	Locative	mladém		mladé	mladém
Sg.	Instrumental	mladým		mladou	mladým
Pl.	Nominative	mladí	mladé		mladá
Pl.	Genitive	mladých			
Pl.	Dative	mladým			
Pl.	Accusative	mladé			mladá
Pl.	Vocative	mladí!	mladé!		mladá!
Pl.	Locative	mladých			
Pl.	Instrumental	mladými			

mladý – young

=== Soft declension ===
		Masculine animate	Masculine inanimate	Feminine	Neuter
Sg.	Nominative	jarní			
Sg.	Genitive	jarního		jarní	jarního
Sg.	Dative	jarnímu		jarní	jarnímu
Sg.	Accusative	jarního	jarní		
Sg.	Vocative	jarní!			
Sg.	Locative	jarním		jarní	jarním
Sg.	Instrumental	jarním		jarní	jarním
Pl.	Nominative	jarní			
Pl.	Genitive	jarních			
Pl.	Dative	jarním			
Pl.	Accusative	jarní			
Pl.	Vocative	jarní!			
Pl.	Locative	jarních			
Pl.	Instrumental	jarními			

jarní – spring, vernal

=== Possessive adjectives ===
Possessive adjectives are formed from animate singular nouns (masculine and feminine):

otec (father) -> otcův (father's)
matka (mother) -> matčin (mother's)

		Masculine animate	Masculine inanimate	Feminine	Neuter
Sg.	Nominative	otcův		otcova	otcovo
Sg.	Genitive	otcova		otcovy	otcova
Sg.	Dative	otcovu		otcově	otcovu
Sg.	Accusative	otcova	otcův	otcovu	otcovo
Sg.	Vocative	otcův		otcova	otcovo
Sg.	Locative	otcově			
Sg.	Instrumental	otcovým		otcovou	otcovým
Pl.	Nominative	otcovi	otcovy		otcova
Pl.	Genitive	otcových			
Pl.	Dative	otcovým			
Pl.	Accusative	otcovy			otcova
Pl.	Vocative	otcovi	otcovy		otcova
Pl.	Locative	otcových			
Pl.	Instrumental	otcovými			

		Masculine animate	Masculine inanimate	Feminine	Neuter
Sg.	Nominative	matčin		matčina	matčino
Sg.	Genitive	matčina		matčiny	matčina
Sg.	Dative	matčinu		matčině	matčinu
Sg.	Accusative	matčina	matčin	matčinu	matčino
Sg.	Vocative	matčin		matčina	matčino
Sg.	Locative	matčině			
Sg.	Instrumental	matčiným		matčinou	matčiným
Pl.	Nominative	matčini	matčiny		matčina
Pl.	Genitive	matčiných			
Pl.	Dative	matčiným			
Pl.	Accusative	matčiny			matčina
Pl.	Vocative	matčini	matčiny		matčina
Pl.	Locative	matčiných			
Pl.	Instrumental	matčinými			

Examples:

otcův dům – father's house
matčino auto – mother's car

Possessive adjectives are often used in the names of streets, squares, buildings, etc.:

Neruda -> Nerudova ulice (Neruda street)

but:

Jan Neruda -> ulice Jana Nerudy (noun genitive)
partyzáni (partisans, guerilla) -> ulice Partyzánů

=== Comparisons ===
The comparative is formed by the suffix -ejší, -ější, -ší, or -í (there is no simple rule which suffix should be used).

The superlative is formed by adding the prefix nej- to the comparative.

Examples:

krásný – krásnější – nejkrásnější (beautiful – more beautiful – the most beautiful)
hladký – hladší – nejhladší (smooth – smoother – the smoothest)
tenký – tenčí – nejtenčí (slim – slimmer – the slimmest)
snadný – snazší, snadnější – nejsnazší, nejsnadnější (easy – easier – the easiest)
zadní – zazší, zadnější – nejzazší, nejzadnější (posterior – more posterior – the most posterior)
úzký – užší – nejužší (narrow – narrower – the narrowest)
měkký – měkčí – nejměkčí (soft – softer – the softest)

The comparative and the superlative can be also formed by the words více (more)/méně (less) and nejvíce (most)/nejméně (least):

spokojený – více/méně spokojený – nejvíce/nejméně spokojený (satisfied – more/less satisfied – the most/least satisfied)

Irregular comparisons:

dobrý – lepší – nejlepší (good – better – the best)
špatný – horší – nejhorší (bad – worse – the worst)
velký – větší – největší (big – bigger – the biggest)
malý – menší – nejmenší (small/little – smaller/less – the smallest/least)
dlouhý – delší – nejdelší (long – longer – the longest)
svatý – světější – nejsvětější (holy – holier – the holiest)
bílý – bělejší – nejbělejší (white – whiter – the whitest)

=== Short forms ===
There are also short forms in some adjectives. They are used in the nominative and are regarded as literary in the contemporary language. They are related to active and passive participles. (See Czech verb)

Singular			Plural			English
Masculine	Feminine	Neuter	Masculine animate	Masculine inanimate & Feminine	Neuter	English
mlád rád	mláda ráda	mládo rádo	mládi rádi	mlády rády	mláda ráda	young glad

Example:

On je ještě příliš mlád. = On je ještě příliš mladý. (He is still too young.)

Rád is used in a short form only: Jsem rád, že jste přišli. (I am glad that you came.)

== Pronouns ==
Pronoun declension is complicated, some are declined according to adjective paradigms, some are irregular.

=== Personal pronouns ===
#	Case	First	Second	Third		
#	Case	First	Second	Masculine	Feminine	Neuter
Singular	Nominative	já (I)	ty (you)	on (he)	ona (she)	ono (it)
Singular	Genitive	mne, mě (short form)	tebe, tě (short form)	jeho, jej, ho (short form) něho, něj (after prepositions)	jí ní (after a preposition)	jeho, jej, ho (short form) něho, něj (after prepositions)
Singular	Dative	mně, mi	tobě, ti	jemu, mu němu	jí ní	jemu, mu němu
Singular	Accusative	mne, mě	tebe, tě	jeho, ho, jej něho, něj	ji ni	je(j), ho ně(j)
Singular	Locative	mně	tobě	něm	ní	něm
Singular	Instrumental	mnou	tebou	jím ním	jí ní	jím ním
Plural	Nominative	my (we)	vy (you)	oni (they)	ony (they)	ona (they)
Plural	Genitive	nás	vás	jich nich		
Plural	Dative	nám	vám	jim nim		
Plural	Accusative	nás	vás	je ně		
Plural	Locative	nás	vás	nich		
Plural	Instrumental	námi	vámi	jimi nimi		

In some singular cases, short forms of pronouns are possible, which are clitics. They cannot be used with prepositions. They are unstressed, therefore they cannot be the first words in sentences. Usually they appear in second place in a sentence or clause, obeying Wackernagel's Law. Examples:

Nedávej mi to. Don't give it to me.
Mně to nedávej. Don't give it to me. (emphasizing mně)
Přijď ke mně. Come to me.

In 3rd person (singular and plural) j-forms are used without prepositions, n-forms are used after prepositions:

Ukaž mu to. or Ukaž to jemu. (emphasizing jemu) Show it to him.
Přišla k němu. She came to him.

Accusative forms jej (on), je, ně (ono) are usually regarded as archaic.

They: oni – masculine animate gender, ony – masculine inanimate and feminine genders, ona – neuter gender

Reflexive personal pronoun

Reflexive personal pronoun is used when the object is identical to the subject. It has no nominative form and it is the same for all persons and numbers. It is translated into English as myself, yourself, himself, etc.

Nominative	----
Genitive	sebe
Dative	sobě, si
Accusative	sebe, se
Locative	sobě
Instrumental	sebou

Example:

Vidím se (sebe) v zrcadle. I see myself in the mirror.

Short form se and si are again clitics; often they are a part of reflexive verbs and as such are not usually translated into English explicitly:

Posaď se./Sedni si. Sit down.

=== Possessive pronouns ===
Můj – my Tvůj – your

		Masculine animate	Masculine inanimate	Feminine	Neuter
Sg.	Nominative	můj tvůj		moje, má tvoje, tvá	moje, mé tvoje, tvé
Sg.	Genitive	mého tvého		mojí, mé tvojí, tvé	mého tvého
Sg.	Dative	mému tvému		mojí, mé tvojí, tvé	mému tvému
Sg.	Accusative	mého tvého	můj tvůj	moji, mou tvoji, tvou	moje, mé tvoje, tvé
Sg.	Locative	mém tvém		mojí, mé tvojí, tvé	mém tvém
Sg.	Instrumental	mým tvým		mojí, mou tvojí, tvou	mým tvým
Pl.	Nominative	moji, mí tvoji, tví	moje, mé tvoje, tvé		moje, má tvoje, tvá
Pl.	Genitive	mých tvých			
Pl.	Dative	mým tvým			
Pl.	Accusative	moje, mé tvoje, tvé			moje, má tvoje, tvá
Pl.	Locative	mých tvých			
Pl.	Instrumental	mými tvými			

Jeho – his, its
This pronoun is indeclinable.

Její – her

		Masculine animate	Masculine inanimate	Feminine	Neuter
Sg.	Nominative	její			
Sg.	Genitive	jejího		její	jejího
Sg.	Dative	jejímu		její	jejímu
Sg.	Accusative	jejího	její		
Sg.	Locative	jejím		její	jejím
Sg.	Instrumental	jejím		její	jejím
Pl.	Nominative	její			
Pl.	Genitive	jejích			
Pl.	Dative	jejím			
Pl.	Accusative	její			
Pl.	Locative	jejích			
Pl.	Instrumental	jejími			

Náš – our Váš – your

		Masculine animate	Masculine inanimate	Feminine	Neuter
Sg.	Nominative	náš váš		naše vaše	
Sg.	Genitive	našeho vašeho		naší vaší	našeho vašeho
Sg.	Dative	našemu vašemu		naší vaší	našemu vašemu
Sg.	Accusative	našeho vašeho	náš váš	naši vaši	naše vaše
Sg.	Locative	našem vašem		naší vaší	našem vašem
Sg.	Instrumental	naším vaším		naší vaší	naším vaším
Pl.	Nominative	naši vaši	naše vaše		
Pl.	Genitive	našich vašich			
Pl.	Dative	našim vašim			
Pl.	Accusative	naše vaše			
Pl.	Locative	našich vašich			
Pl.	Instrumental	našimi vašimi			

Jejich – their
This pronoun is indeclinable.

Reflexive possessive pronoun

The reflexive possessive pronoun is used when the possessor is also the subject (my own, your own, etc.). It is identical for all persons.

		Masculine animate	Masculine inanimate	Feminine	Neuter
Sg.	Nominative	svůj		svoje, svá	svoje, své
Sg.	Genitive	svého		svojí, své	svého
Sg.	Dative	svému		svojí, své	svému
Sg.	Accusative	svého	svůj	svoji, svou	svoje, své
Sg.	Locative	svém		svojí, své	svém
Sg.	Instrumental	svým		svojí, svou	svým
Pl.	Nominative	svoji, sví	svoje, své		svoje, svá
Pl.	Genitive	svých			
Pl.	Dative	svým			
Pl.	Accusative	svoje, své			svoje, svá
Pl.	Locative	svých			
Pl.	Instrumental	svými			

Examples:

Vidím svého otce. I see my father.
Vidíš svého otce. You see your father.

Compare:

On vidí svého otce. He sees his father. (his own father)
On vidí jeho otce. He sees his father. (the father of someone else)

=== Demonstrative pronouns ===
Ten – the, this, that

		Masculine animate	Masculine inanimate	Feminine	Neuter
Sg.	Nominative	ten		ta	to
Sg.	Genitive	toho		té	toho
Sg.	Dative	tomu		té	tomu
Sg.	Accusative	toho	ten	tu	to
Sg.	Locative	tom		té	tom
Sg.	Instrumental	tím		tou	tím
Pl.	Nominative	ti	ty		ta
Pl.	Genitive	těch			
Pl.	Dative	těm			
Pl.	Accusative	ty			ta
Pl.	Locative	těch			
Pl.	Instrumental	těmi			

Tenhle, tahle, tohle/tento, tato, toto (this) and tamten, tamta, tamto (that) are declined as ten + to (tento, tohoto, tomuto ...), resp. tam + ten (tamten, tamtoho, tamtomu ...).
Onen, ona, ono (that – not to be confused with personal pronouns) is declined as ten (onen, onoho, onomu ...).

To is often used as personal pronoun instead of ono (it):

Dej mi to. Give it to me.

"To je/jsou" means "this is/these are" and is used for all genders and both numbers:

To je můj přítel. This is my friend. (Přítel is masculine.)
To jsou mí přátelé. These are my friends.

=== Interrogative and relative pronouns ===
Kdo – who Co – what

Nominative	kdo	co
Genitive	koho	čeho
Dative	komu	čemu
Accusative	koho	co
Locative	kom	čem
Instrumental	kým	čím

Který – which, who
declined as mladý

Jaký – what, what kind, what type
declined as mladý

Compare:

Co je to? What is it/this?
Jaké je to? What is it like, what kind is it, what type is it?

Čí – whose
declined as jarní

Jenž – which, who

		Masculine animate	Masculine inanimate	Feminine	Neuter
Sg.	Nominative	jenž		jež	
Sg.	Genitive	jehož něhož		jíž níž	jehož něhož
Sg.	Dative	jemuž němuž		jíž níž	jemuž němuž
Sg.	Accusative	jehož, jejž něhož	jejž nějž	již niž	jež něž
Sg.	Locative	němž		níž	němž
Sg.	Instrumental	jímž nímž		jíž níž	jímž nímž
Pl.	Nominative	již	jež		
Pl.	Genitive	jichž nichž			
Pl.	Dative	jimž nimž			
Pl.	Accusative	jež něž			
Pl.	Locative	nichž			
Pl.	Instrumental	jimiž nimiž			

Jenž is not an interrogative pronoun, it is equivalent to který (as a relative pronoun):

Vidím muže, který/jenž právě přichází. I can see a man who is just coming.

=== Indefinite and negative pronouns ===
někdo, kdos(i) (old) – somebody, someone
nikdo – nobody, no one
kdokoli(v) – anyone
leckdo(s), leda(s)kdo, kdekdo – many people, frequently/commonly someone
declined like kdo (někdo, někoho, někomu, …; nikdo, nikoho, nikomu, …; kdokoli, kohokoli, komukoli, …; leckdo, leckoho, leckomu, …)

něco – something
nic – nothing
cokoli(v) – anything
lecco(s), ledaco(s), leda(s)co, kdeco – many things, frequently/commonly something
declined like co (něco, něčeho, něčemu, …; nic, ničeho, ničemu, …; cokoli, čehokoli, čemukoli, …; lecos, lecčeho, lecčemu, …)

každý – each, each one
nějaký – some, one, a(n)
některý – some, particular, selected (little more specific than nějaký)
kterýsi (old), jakýsi (old) – some, someone (more specific)
žádný – none, no (as in "no man has ever been there")
nijaký – no whatsoever; of no properties (specifically)
jakýkoli(v), kterýkoli – any
lecjaký, leda(s)jaký, kdejaký, kdekterý – frequently/commonly some, whichever
všelijaký – getting many forms, various
veškerý – entire, total, all
declined like mladý

něčí, čísi (old) – belonging to someone or something
ničí – belonging to no one or nothing
číkoli – belonging to any one or anything
lecčí, leda(s)čí, kdečí – belonging to many or frequent/common number of owners, whosever
declined like jarní

Example: –„Tam se asi nikdo nedostane.‟ –„Ne, tam přijímají ledaskoho. Leckdy i se špatnými známkami. Skoro každý se tam dostane, ať už jakkoli, ale ne jen tak kdokoli dokončí studia.‟ (–"I guess no one gets there." –"No, they admit many people there. In many cases/frequently/commonly even with bad marks. Almost everyone gets there, no matter how, but not just anyone will finish the studies.")

Czech grammar allows more than one negative word to exist in a sentence. For example: „Tady nikde nikdy nikdo nijak odnikud nikam nepostoupí.‟, standing for: "Anywhere around here, no one will ever progress from any place anywhere in any way." (literally, word by word: "Here nowhere never nobody no way nowhence nowhere won't progress."), uses six negatives in adverbs and pronouns and one at verb while still being grammatically correct. It uses negative form in questions, expressing doubts, wishes, asking for favours, etc. like, for example: „Neměl bys být už ve škole?!‟ ("Shouldn't you be at school already?!"); „Neměl byste na mě pár minut čas?‟ ("Wouldn't you have few minutes of Your time for me?"); „Nemáš náhodou papír a tužku?‟ ("Don't you, by chance, happen to have a paper and some pencil?"); „Přišel jsem se tě zeptat, jestli bychom si nemohli vyměnit směny.‟ ("I came to ask if we could not swap our shifts.")

== Prepositions with certain cases ==
Czech prepositions are matched with certain cases of nouns. They are usually not matched with the nominative case, which is primarily used as the subject in sentences. However, there are some exceptions to this rule: foreign prepositions (kontra, versus, etc.) are matched with the nominative, but their use is very rare. No prepositions are matched with the vocative, because it is used for addressing people only.

Genitive:

během – during, while, through the course of (e.g. během prázdnin – during the holidays)
bez – without (e.g. bez dcerky neodejdu – I won't go without my daughter)
do – in; to (e.g. dej to do krabice – put it in a box; jít do bytu – to go into a flat); until (e.g. čekat do tří – to wait until 3:00)
kolem – around (e.g. chodil kolem rybníka – he was walking around the pond)
krom(ě), vedle – except, besides (e.g. kromě něj tam byla i ona – besides him, she was there too)
(na)místo – instead of (e.g. místo tebe hrál náhradník – a substitute played instead of you)
od – from, since, as of (e.g. od listopadu jsem volný – I'm free from/as of November; dopis od mé matky – a letter from my mother)
ohledně – regarding
okolo – about, around, circa/roughly (e.g. tráva okolo studny – grass around the well; bylo jich okolo stovky – there were about 100 of them)
podél – along
(po)dle – according to (e.g. podle normy – according to norm)
pomocí – with the help of; using (e.g. pomocí klacku ho dostali z bažiny – with the help of a stick they got him out of a marsh)
prostřednictvím – through; with a help/device/instrument of; utilizing; using … as intermediate/liaison
s – from higher place to lower (obsolete) (e.g. sebral hračku s poličky – he took the toy from the shelf)
stran – from the point of view of; because of; regarding (rare)
u – by, next to, at (e.g. vchod u rohu – entrance at the corner; u stolu – at/around the table, jsem u tebe – I'm at your house)
vedle – next to, besides (e.g. na té fotce stojí Lucie vedle Moniky – in the photo, Lucie is standing next to Monika)
vlivem – due to, because of, for, through the influence of (e.g. vlivem bouřky jsme se nemohli dívat na televizi – because of the storm we couldn't watch TV)
vyjma – except for, excluding (e.g. vyjma tebe všichni souhlasí – everyone agrees except for you; less frequent)
využitím – using (e.g. využitím slevy si to mohla koupit – using a discount, she was able to buy it)
z – from, out of (e.g. kouř z komínu – smoke out of a chimney)

Dative:

díky – thanks to (e.g. díky němu máme naše peníze zpět – thanks to him, we have our money back), note: used only if the cause is positive or beneficial, otherwise kvůli or vlivem is used
k – to(wards) (e.g. jedeme k jezeru – we're going to(wards) the lake, jdu k tobě – i'm coming to your house; přijedeme ke konci července – we are going to come towards the end of July)
kvůli – due to, because of, for, through the influence of (e.g. udělej to kvůli mě – do it for me; udělal to kvůli mě – he did it because of me)
(na)proti – against, opposite to (e.g. je proti tobě – (s) he's against you; je to naproti lékárně – it's opposite to the pharmacy)
oproti – opposite to, unlike, to the contrary to (e.g. oproti teoriím věřím faktům – unlike the theories, I believe the facts)
vůči – in the face of, toward(s) (e.g laskavost vůči někomu – kindness towards someone; porovnej to vůči originálu – compare it with the original)

Accusative:

pro – for (e.g. udělal to pro mě – he did/made it for me)
za – for (less frequent); instead of; behind (direction); per (e.g. za vlast – for the country; 1 porce za 5 korun – 1 portion for 5 crowns; vyměnil ji za mladší – he switched her for a younger one; běhala za plot – she ran behind a fence)
před – in front of (direction) (e.g. vyvěs to před dům – (go) hang it in front of the house)
mimo – aside from, besides, off, out of, parallel to (place) (e.g. mimo Prahu – outside of Prague; mimo terč – off the bullet; mimo provoz – out of order; mimo – out/miss/no hit; mimo jiné – besides other things)
na – (on)to (direction) (e.g. dej to na stůl – put it on the table; na vánoce zůstaneme doma – at Christmas we will stay at home)
pod – under, below (direction)
nad – over, above (direction) (e.g. dej ten kříž nade dveře – put the cross above the door; nad tebe není – no one is better than you)
mezi – between, among (direction) (e.g. dali ho mezi ostatní – they put him among the others)
skrz – through (e.g. šíp prošel skrze jablko – the arrow went through the apple; jsem tu skrz tu stížnost – I'm here regarding the complaint)
o – by, for (e.g. zvýšit o 1 – increase by one; zápas o 3. místo – match for the 3rd place)
v – in (e.g. věřit v boha – to believe in God)

Locative:

o – about, of (e.g. mluvit o ní – to talk about her)
na – on (e.g. skvrna na sukni – stain on a skirt)
v – in (e.g. ruka v rukávu – arm in a sleeve)
po – after (e.g. po obědě – after lunch; jdu po čáře – I walk the line)
při – by; during (e.g. při obřadu – during the ceremonial; stůj při mně – stand by me/be my support)

Instrumental:

s – with (e.g. s tebou – with you)
za – behind, beyond, after (place), in/after (time); (e.g. stát za rohem – to stand behind the corner; kdo za tím je? – who's behind (it)?/what's the meritum?; za horizontem – beyond the horizon)
před – in front of (place); before; ago; from; against (e.g. přímo před tebou – right in front of you; před mnoha lety – many years ago; uniknout před pronásledovateli – to escape from pursuers; varovat před ním – to warn against him)
pod – under(neath), below (place) (e.g. pod stolem spí pes – a dog is sleeping under the table)
nad – over, above (place)
mezi – between, among (place) (e.g. mezi póly – between poles; mezi kuřaty – among chicken)

== Plural forms ==
Like other Slavic languages, Czech distinguishes two different plural forms in the nominative case. For numbers 2 to 4 or in cases where the quantity of the plural noun is not defined in any way, the nominative plural form is used. For higher numbers or when used with a quantifying adjective, the genitive form is used, and any following verb will be neuter singular. This declension applies to nouns and adjectives.

Singular nominative	1 dlouhá hodina
Nominative plural (2 to 4 or indefinite)	2 dlouhé hodiny
Genitive plural (over 4 or quantified)	5 dlouhých hodin; pár hodin

(dlouhý – long, hodina – hour, pár – a few; a pair)

== Gender and number of compound phrases ==
In the case of a compound noun phrase (coordinate structure), of the form "X and Y", "X, Y and Z", etc., the following rules for gender and number apply:

- When any of the components is masculine animate, the whole compound is masculine animate plural.
- If every component is neuter plural, the whole compound is neuter plural.
- In other cases (no masculine animate component, and at least one component which is not neuter plural), the whole compound is feminine/masculine inanimate plural (the feminine and the masculine inanimate forms of verbs and adjectives are identical in the plural).

However:

- If the verb precedes the compound subject, it may agree either with the subject as a whole (according to the above rules) or with the first component of the subject.
- When the compound is formed using s ("with") rather than a ("and"), the verb or predicate may agree with the first component (the part before s) or with the subject as a whole (according to the above rules).
- When coordinated adjectives are applied to a singular noun (as in česká a německá strana, "the Czech and German sides", literally "side"), the whole may be treated as either singular or plural (but singular is preferred in the case of abstract nouns).

For further description (in Czech) and example sentences, see the Institute of the Czech Language source listed below.

== See also ==
- Czech conjugation
- Czech language
- Czech alphabet
- Czech name
- Czech orthography

== Sources ==
- KARLÍK, P.; NEKULA, M.; RUSÍNOVÁ, Z. (eds.). Příruční mluvnice češtiny. Praha: Nakladelství Lidové noviny, 1995. ISBN 80-7106-134-4.
- ŠAUR, Vladimír. Pravidla českého pravopisu s výkladem mluvnice. Praha: Ottovo nakladatelství, 2004. ISBN 80-7181-133-5.
- Shoda přísudku s podmětem několikanásobným, on the website of the Institute of the Czech Language of the Academy of Sciences of the Czech Republic
