= Czech conjugation =

Aspect of Czech grammar

Czech conjugation is the system of conjugation (grammatically-determined modifications) of verbs in Czech.

Czech is a null-subject language, i.e. the subject (including personal pronouns) can be omitted if known from context. The person is expressed by the verb:

já dělám = dělám = I do
on dělal = dělal = he was doing

== Infinitive ==
The infinitive is formed by the ending -t, formerly also -ti; on some words -ct (-ci):

být – to be, jít – to go, péct – to bake

Somewhat archaically:

býti – to be, jíti – to go, péci – to bake

== Participles ==
Participles are used for forming the past tense, conditionals and the passive voice in Czech. They are related to the short forms of adjectives. Therefore unlike other verb forms, they also express gender which must correspond with the gender of the subject.

=== Past participle ===
The past participle (also known as the "active participle" or "l-participle") is used for forming the past tense and the conditionals.

Singular			Plural			English
Masculine	Feminine	Neuter	Masculine animate	Masculine inanimate & feminine	Neuter	English
byl dělal	byla dělala	bylo dělalo	byli dělali	byly dělaly	byla dělala	was/were did

=== Passive participle ===
The passive participle is also called "n/t-participle" and is used for forming the passive voice. There are two types of endings:

Singular			Plural			English
Masculine	Feminine	Neuter	Masculine animate	Masculine inanimate & Feminine	Neuter	English
bit dělán	bita dělána	bito děláno	biti děláni	bity dělány	bita dělána	beaten, battered done

=== Agreement between subject and predicate ===
The predicate must always be in accordance with the subject in the sentence – in number and person (personal pronouns), and with past and passive participles also in gender. This grammatical principle affects the orthography (see also Czech orthography) – it is especially important for the correct choice and writing of plural endings of participles.

Examples:

Gender	Sg.	Pl.	English
masculine animate	pes byl koupen	psi byli koupeni	a dog was bought/dogs were bought
masculine inanimate	hrad byl koupen	hrady byly koupeny	a castle was bought/castles were bought
feminine	kočka byla koupena	kočky byly koupeny	a cat was bought/cats were bought
neuter	město bylo koupeno	města byla koupena	a town was bought/towns were bought

The example mentioned shows both past (byl, byla ...) and passive (koupen, koupena ...) participles. The accordance in gender takes effect in the past tense and the passive voice, not in the present and future tenses in active voice.

If the complex subject is a combination of nouns of different genders, masculine animate gender is prior to others and the masculine inanimate and feminine genders are prior to the neuter gender. The neuter endings on the predicate are only used if all nouns in the subject are neuter and plural, otherwise the masculine inanimate/feminine forms are used.

Examples:

- muži a ženy byli – men and women were
- kočky a koťata byly – cats and kittens were
- kotě a štěně byly – a puppy and a kitten were
- koťata a štěňata byla – puppies and kittens were
- my jsme byli (my = we all/men) vs. my jsme byly (my = we women) – we were

Priority of genders:

masculine animate > masculine inanimate & feminine > neuter

== Transgressives ==
The transgressive (přechodník) expresses an action which happens coincidentally with or forgoing some other action.

The transgressive (přechodník) is an archaic form of the verb in Czech and Slovak. Nowadays, it is used only occasionally for artistic purposes or in unchanging expressions. Transgressives were still used quite widely in Czech literature in the beginning of the 20th century (not in the spoken language). For example, Jaroslav Hašek's The Good Soldier Švejk contains a lot of them.

Czech recognizes present and past transgressives. The present transgressive can express present or future action according to the aspect of the verb it is derived from. The past transgressive is usually derived from perfective verbs.

	masculine	feminine + neuter	plural
present transgressive	–e –a	–íc –ouc	–íce –ouce
past transgressive	–v –∅	–vši –ši	–vše –še

Examples:

- Usednuvši u okna, začala plakat. (Having sat down at a window, she began to cry.) – past transgressive (foregoing action)
- Děti, vidouce babičku, vyběhly ven. (The children, seeing grandma, ran out.) – present transgressive (coincident action/process)

== Aspect ==
Czech verbs are distinguished by aspect, they are either perfective or imperfective. Perfective verbs indicate the finality of the process. Therefore, they cannot express the present tense.

Perfective verbs are usually formed adding prefixes to imperfective verbs:

psát (imperf.) – to write, to be writing → napsat (perf.) – to write down

Some perfective verbs are not formally related to imperfective ones:

brát (imperf.) – to take, to be taking → vzít (perf.) – to take

== Tenses ==
Czech verbs express three absolute tenses – past, present and future. Relativity can be expressed by the aspect, sentence constructions and participles.

The present tense can be expressed in imperfective verbs only.

=== Present tense ===
The present tense is formed by special endings:

Person	Singular	Plural
1.	-u/-i/-m	-eme/-íme/-áme
2.	-eš/-íš/-áš	-ete/-íte/-áte
3.	-e/-í/-á	-ejí/-ějí/-í/-ou/-ají

Verbs are divided into 5 classes according to the way of forming the present tense. They are described in more detail below.

=== Past tense ===
The past tense is formed by the past participle (in a proper gender form) and present forms of the verb být (to be) which are omitted in the 3rd person. The following example is for the male gender (animate in plural):

Person	Singular	Plural
1.	dělal jsem	dělali jsme
2.	dělal jsi	dělali jste
3.	dělal	dělali

Dělat – to do

For the choice of past tense form when the number or gender of the subject may not be clear, see Czech declension § Gender and number of compound phrases.

=== Future tense ===
In imperfective verbs, it is formed by the future forms of the verb být (to be) and the infinitive:

Person	Singular	Plural
1.	budu dělat	budeme dělat
2.	budeš dělat	budete dělat
3.	bude dělat	budou dělat

Dělat – to do

Budu, budeš, ... with infinitive has the same meaning as "(I, you, ...) will" in English. If not followed by an infinitive, it means "(I, you, ...) will be" (i.e. I will be = budu, not budu být).

In some verbs of motion, the future tense is formed by adding the prefix po-/pů- to the present form:

půjdu – I will go, ponesu – I will carry, povezu – I will transport (in a vehicle)

In perfective verbs, the present form expresses the future. Compare:

budu dělat – I will be doing
udělám – I will do, I will have done

=== Tenses in subordinate clauses ===
There is no sequence of tenses in Czech. The types of clauses like in the indirect speech use tenses that express the time which is spoken about. The tense of the subordinate clause is not shifted to the past even though there is the past tense in the main clause:

Říká, že nemá dost peněz. (present tense) – He says he doesn't have enough money.
Říkal, že nemá dost peněz. (present tense) – He said he didn't have enough money.
Říkal, že Petr přišel v pět hodin. (past tense) – He said Peter had come at five o'clock.
Říkal, že to udělá v pátek. (future tense) – He said he would do it on Friday.

== Imperative ==
The imperative mood is formed for the 2nd person singular and plural and the 1st person plural.

In the 2nd person singular, it takes either null ending or -i/-ej ending, according to the verb class.

The 2nd person plural takes the ending -te/-ete/-ejte and the 1st person plural takes -me/-eme/-ejme.

Examples:

buď! buďte! (be!) buďme! (let's be!)
spi! spěte! (sleep!) spěme! (let's sleep!)
dělej! dělejte! (do!) dělejme! (let's do!)

== Conditionals ==
The conditionals are formed by the past participle and special forms (derived from Old Czech aorist forms) of the verb být (to be). Following example of the present conditional is for the male gender (animate in plural):

Person	Singular	Plural
1.	dělal bych	dělali bychom
2.	dělal bys	dělali byste
3.	dělal by	dělali by

dělal bych – I would do

There is also the past conditional in Czech but it is usually replaced by the present conditional.

Person	Singular	Plural
1.	byl bych dělal	byli bychom dělali
2.	byl bys dělal	byli byste dělali
3.	byl by dělal	byli by dělali

byl bych dělal – I would have done

By also becomes a part of conjugations aby (so that) and kdyby (if). Therefore, these conjunctions take the same endings:

Kdybych nepracoval, nedostal bych výplatu. If I didn't work, I would get no wages.

== Passive voice ==
There are two ways to form the passive voice in Czech:

1. By the verb být (to be) and the passive participle:

Město bylo založeno ve 14. století. The town was founded in the 14th century.

2. By adding the reflexive pronoun se:

Ono se to neudělalo. It has not been done.
To se vyrábí v Číně. It is produced in China.

However, the use of se is not exclusive to the passive voice.

== Reflexive verbs ==
Reflexive pronouns se and si are components of reflexive verbs (se/si is not usually translated into English):

posadit se – to sit down
myslet si – to think, to suppose

== Negation ==
Negation is formed by the prefix ne-. In the future tense and the passive voice it is added to the auxiliary verb být (to be), while in the past tense and in conditionals it is added to the participle.

nedělat – not to do
nedělám – I do not do
nedělej! do not do!
nedělal jsem – I did not do
nebudu dělat – I will not do
nedělal bych – I would not do
byl bych neudělal or nebyl bych udělal – I would not have done
není děláno – it is not done

Unlike English, a negative pronoun must be used with a negative verb (using a positive verb is ungrammatical) (double negative):

Nic nemám. – I have nothing. (literally I do not have nothing.)
Nikdy to nikomu neříkej. – Never say it to anybody. (literally Do not never say it to nobody.)

== Verb classes ==
=== Class I ===
Infinitive	nést	číst	péct	třít	brát	mazat
English	carry	read	bake	rub	take	lubricate
Present tense	nesu neseš nese neseme nesete nesou	čtu čteš čte čteme čtete čtou	peču pečeš peče pečeme pečete pečou	třu třeš tře třeme třete třou	beru bereš bere bereme berete berou	mažu mažeš maže mažeme mažete mažou
Past participle	nesl	četl	pekl	třel	bral	mazal
Passive participle	nesen	čten	pečen	třen	brán	mazán
Imperative	nes! neste! nesme!	čti! čtěte! čtěme!	peč! pečte! pečme!	tři! třete! třeme!	ber! berte! berme!	maž! mažte! mažme!
Present transgressive	nesa nesouc nesouce	čta čtouc čtouce	peka/peče pekouc/pečíc pekouce/pečíce	tra trouc trouce	bera berouc berouce	maže mažíc mažíce
Past transgressive	(do)nes (do)nesši (do)nesše	(pře)čet (pře)četši (pře)četše	(u)pek (u)pekši (u)pekše	(u)třev (u)třevši (u)třevše	(se)brav (se)bravši (se)bravše	(na)mazav (na)mazavši (na)mazavše

In imperative, 0/-te/-me endings are in most verbs, -i/-ete/-eme or -i/-ěte/-ěme if two consonants are at the end of the word-stem.

=== Class II ===
Infinitive	tisknout	minout	začít	hnout
English	print, press	miss	begin	move
Present tense	tisknu tiskneš tiskne tiskneme tisknete tisknou	minu mineš mine mineme minete minou	začnu začneš začne začneme začnete začnou	hnu hneš hne hneme hnete hnou
Past participle	tiskl	minul	začal	hnul
Passive participle	tisknut/tištěn	minut	začnut	hnut
Imperative	tiskni! tiskněte! tiskněme!	miň! miňte! miňme!	začni! začněte! začněme!	hni! hněte! hněme!
Present transgressive	tiskna tisknouc tisknouce	mina minouc minouce		
Past transgressive	(při)tisknuv (při)tisknuvši (při)tisknuvše	minuv minuvši minuvše	začav začavši začavše	hnuv hnuvši hnuvše

=== Class III ===
Infinitive	krýt	kupovat
English	cover	buy
Present tense	kryji, kryju kryješ kryje kryjeme kryjete kryjí, kryjou	kupuji, kupuju kupuješ kupuje kupujeme kupujete kupují, kupujou
Past participle	kryl	kupoval
Passive participle	kryt	kupován
Imperative	kryj! kryjte! kryjme!	kupuj! kupujte! kupujme!
Present transgressive	kryje kryjíc kryjíce	kupujíce kupujíc kupujíce
Past transgressive	(za)kryv (za)kryvši (za)kryvše	kupovav kupovavši kupovavše

=== Class IV ===
Infinitive	prosit	čistit	trpět	sázet	bdít
English	beg	clean	suffer	bet	watch
Present tense	prosím prosíš prosí prosíme prosíte prosí	čistím čistíš čistí čistíme čistíte čistí	trpím trpíš trpí trpíme trpíte trpí	sázím sázíš sází sázíme sázíte sázejí, sází	bdím bdíš bdí bdíme bdíte bdí
Past participle	prosil	čistil	trpěl	sázel	bděl
Passive participle	prošen	čištěn	trpěn	sázen	bděn
Imperative	pros! proste! prosme!	čisti! čistěte! čistěme!	trp! trpte! trpme!	sázej! sázejte! sázejme!	bdi! bděte! bděme!
Present transgressive	prose prosíc prosíce	čistě čistíc čistíce	trpě trpíc trpíce	sázeje sázejíc sázejíce	bdě bdíc bdíce
Past transgressive	prosiv prosivši prosivše	(vy)čistiv (vy)čistivši (vy)čistivše	(s)trpěv (s)trpěvši (s)trpěvše	(vy)sázev (vy)sázevši (vy)sázevše	

In imperative, 0/-te/-me endings are in most verbs, -i/-ete/-eme or -i/-ěte/-ěme if two consonants are at the end of the word-stem.

=== Class V ===
Infinitive	dělat
English	do
Present tense	dělám děláš dělá děláme děláte dělají
Past participle	dělal
Passive participle	dělán
Imperative	dělej! dělejte! dělejme!
Present transgressive	dělaje dělajíc dělajíce
Past transgressive	dělav dělavši dělavše

== Irregular verbs ==
Infinitive	být	jíst sníst	vědět	chtít	moct
English	be	eat eat up	know	want	be able to
Present tense	jsem jsi je/(obsolete)jest jsme jste jsou	jím/sním jíš/sníš jí/sní jíme/sníme jíte/sníte jedí/snědí	vím víš ví víme víte vědí	chci chceš chce chceme chcete chtějí	mohu/můžu můžeš může můžeme můžete mohou/můžou
Past participle	byl	jedl, snědl	věděl	chtěl	mohl
Passive participle	(-byt)	jeden/sněden	věděn	chtěn	
Imperative	buď! buďte! buďme!	jez/sněz! jezte/snězte! jezme/snězme!	věz! vězte! vězme!	chtěj! chtějte! chtějme!	
Present transgressive	jsa jsouc jsouce	jeda jedouc jedouce	věda vědouc vědouce	chtě/chtěje chtíc/chtějíc chtíce/chtějíce	moha mohouc mohouce
Past transgressive	byv byvši byvše	(vy)jed, sněd (vy)jedši, snědši (vy)jedše, snědše	(z)věděv (z)věděvši (z)věděvše	chtěv chtěvši chtěvše	

Irregular future tense:

- jít – půjdu, půjdeš, půjde; půjdeme, půjdete, půjdou
- být – budu, budeš, bude; budeme, budete, budou

Irregular negation:

- být – 3rd person sg: není (not neje)

== See also ==
- Czech declension
- Czech orthography
- Czech language
