= Jan Kořenský =

Czech linguist and lecturer in Czech studies

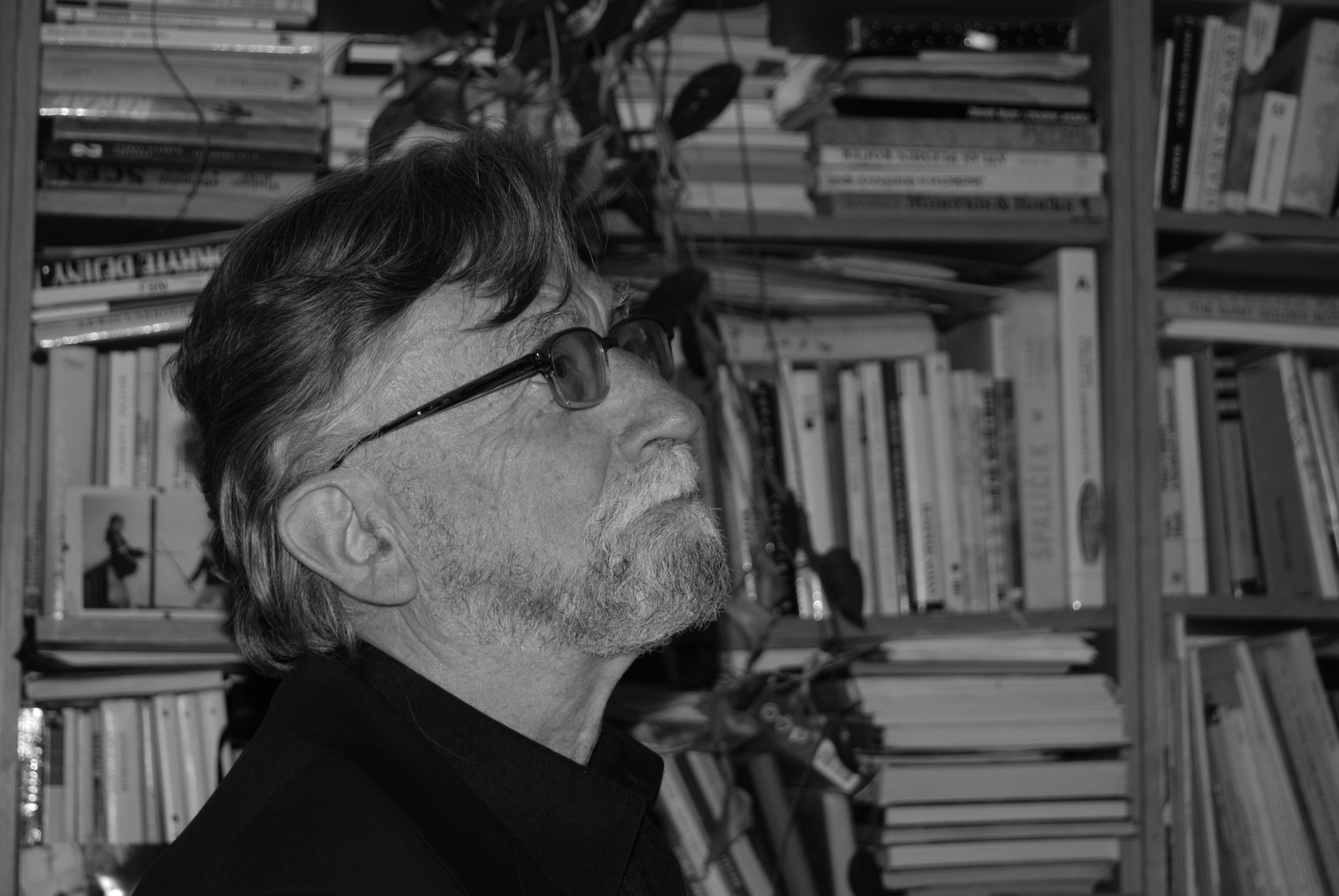
- Born: 24 May 1937; Hradec Králové, Czechoslovakia
- Died: 16 April 2022 (aged 84)
- Occupations: linguist and lecturer in Czech studies, author
- Employer: Palacký University Olomouc
- Title: Professor

Jan Kořenský (24 May 1937 – 16 April 2022) was a Czech linguist, lecturer in Bohemian studies and author. He worked on Czech grammar, general linguistics, linguistic methodology, sign theory, text theory and procedural grammar. He wrote more than 10 books and 70 papers. Kořenský's research had a significant impact on Czech linguistics. He is the co-author of the modern Czech Grammar and a pioneer in the academic field of semantics in relation to Czech and speech as such.

== Career ==
Kořenský was the most prominent representative of the Czech methodological reflection on linguistic research, intervening in discussions about grammars and the grammar of Czech, the scope and content of the notion of natural language grammar. He was a student of lecturers in Czech studies Bohuslav Havránek, Miroslav Komárek, Oldřich Králík and Miloš Dokulil. Professor Kořenský taught and served on the scientific councils of Charles University and Palacký University.

During his scientific career he worked as:

- Editor-in-Chief of Slovo a slovesnost
- Editor-in-Chief of the journal Jazykovědné aktuality
- Member of the Scientific Board of the Faculty of Arts of Palacký University, the Faculty of Arts of Charles University, the Faculty of Arts of Ostrava University and the Faculty of Business and Entrepreneurship of Silesian University in Opava
- Chairman of the Czech Committee of Slavists
- Member of the International Commission on the Grammatical Structure of Slavic Languages at the International Committee of Slavists
- founder of the Department of General Linguistics, Faculty of Arts, Palacký University
- member of the Prague Linguistic Circle

He was co-author of the Czech Grammar II and a major contributor to its conception. In the second half of the 1980s, he was the initiator of an extensive theoretical research focused on the basic concepts of Prague linguistic structuralism and their reflection in further stages of development.

Kořenský was the promoter of positively interdisciplinary approaches to the description of language:

- Scientific conceptualization of the notion of play, possibilities of play as a modeling apparatus of speech, its dynamics.
- Application of general systems theory and chaos theory in contemporary linguistics.
- Sociologizing approaches in complex description of communication process and text.
- Epistemological dimensions of language and speech, reflection on the philosophy of language.

== Publications ==
The books are available in the library dedicated to him at the Department of General Linguistics at Palacký University in Olomouc.
