= Miroslav Komárek =

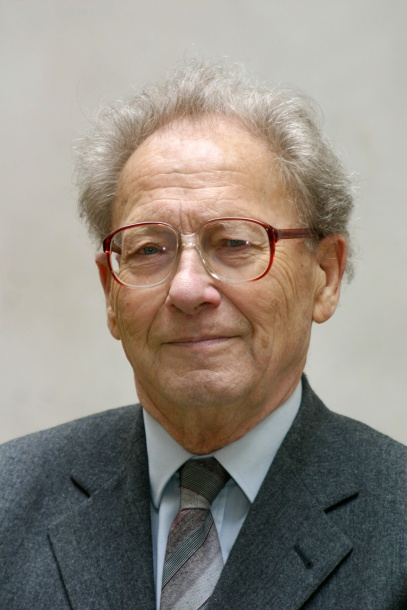
- Born: 20 April 1924; Lazníky, Czechoslovakia
- Died: 15 August 2013 (aged 89); Olomouc, Czech Republic

Academic background
- Education: Palacký University
- Influences: Jan Gebauer, Bohuslav Havránek, Vladimír Šmilauer, František Kopečný, Jan Mukařovský.

Academic work
- Discipline: Historical linguist
- Sub-discipline: Phonology and morphology of the Czech language
- Institutions: Palacký University

Miroslav Komárek (20 April 1924 – 15 August 2013) was a Czech historical linguist and professor emeritus of the Faculty of Arts at Palacký University in Olomouc. His academic publications focused on the morphology and phonology of the Czech language from the diachronic perspective.

== Early life ==
Komárek was born in Lazníky near Přerov. He graduated from a gymnasium in Olomouc in 1943, but was deployed as a labourer until the end of the wartime occupation. After the war he majored in Czech and Russian at Charles University in Prague, then returned to Olomouc, and obtained a doctor of philosophy (PhDr.) degree from Palacký University in 1949.

== Academic career ==
Komárek began to teach at the Faculty of Arts at Palacký University after completing his doctorate, where he went on to spend his entire professional career, spanning over six decades. His first major work, published in 1958, was the first in a series of textbooks on Czech historical linguistics, focused on phonetics. In 1962 he habilitated and twenty years later obtained the title of Doctor of Science (DrSc.). In 1979 he published Příspěvky k české morfologii (Contributions to Czech morphology), which became an oft cited work in papers on Czech morphology. In 2005 he became a professor emeritus at Palacký University. A year before his death, in 2012 he published Dějiny českého jazyka (History of the Czech language), which was a summary of his academic work.

He was heavily influenced by the Prague linguistic circle, and represented their school of thought, structural linguistics, on the international stage within the field of Slavic studies. He also cited prominent Czech philologist Jan Gebauer as a major influence; his 1982 work outlining the phonological development of Czech referenced and commented on Gebauer's historical grammar extensively. He was a regular contributor to the Czech Language Institute's journal Slovo a slovesnost (Word and Literature), eventually joining the editorial board of that journal.

== Published works ==
- Historická mluvnice česká 1 – Hláskosloví (Historical Czech grammar 1 – Phonetics), 1958
- Język czeski – Tymczasowy podręcznik dla klasy dziewiątej dziewięcioletniej szkoły podstawowej z polskim językiem nauczania (Czech language – Temporary handbook for grade nine in nine-year elementary schools with Polish as the language of instruction), 1967
- Język czeski dla klasy dziewiątej dziewięcioletniej szkoły podstawowej z polskim językiem nauczania (Czech language for grade nine in nine-year elementary schools with Polish as the language of instruction), 1968
- Nástin morfologického vývoje českého jazyka (Outline of the morphological development of the Czech language), 1976
- K aktuálním metodologickým otázkám jazykovědy (On current methodological issues in linguistics), 1978
- Příspěvky k české morfologii (Contributions to Czech morphology), 1979
- Nástin fonologického vývoje českého jazyka (Outline of the phonological development of the Czech language), 1982
- Dějiny českého jazyka (History of the Czech language), 2012
