= Lubomír Doležel =

Czech linguist (1922–2017)

Lubomír Doležel (3 October 1922, Lesnice – 28 January 2017, Verona) was a Czech literary theorist and one of the founders of the so-called fictional worlds theory.

== Life, work, and academic career ==
Doležel was born in 1922 in Lesnice in Czechoslovakia. He was educated at Charles University in Prague and received his CSc (roughly equivalent to a PhD) in Slavic philology from the Institute of the Czech Language of the Czechoslovak Academy of Sciences. Many of his teachers and mentors were representatives of the so-called Prague School, an internationally recognized and influential center of inter-war structuralist and semiotic thought. The influence of the Prague School is evident in Dolezel's PhD thesis On the Style of Modern Czech Prose Fiction (published in Czech in 1960) and inspires his later work. In the 1960s Dolezel worked concurrently as research fellow in the Institute of Czech Language and as assistant, and later associate, professor of the Philosophical Faculty of Charles University. He was engaged primarily in the application of mathematics (especially statistics), information theory and cybernetics to the study of language and literature. He founded and co-edited a series entitled Prague Studies in Mathematical Linguistics.

In 1965, Doležel was invited as visiting professor to the University of Michigan in Ann Arbor, where he stayed till 1968. He co-edited (with Richard W. Bailey) a collection of studies Statistics and Style (American Elsevier, 1969). On his return to Prague he was appointed research fellow of the Institute of Czech Literature of the Czechoslovak Academy of Sciences, but in the fall of 1968 he left the country after the Soviet invasion of Czechoslovakia. He was invited to the University of Toronto as visiting professor in the Department of Slavic Languages and Literatures, where he later became full professor. He established the study of Czech language and literature at the university. In 1982, he was cross-appointed to the Centre for Comparative Literature. His main research interest was the theory of literature, with a focus on narrative (narratology). Doležel's theoretical position was strongly influenced by analytic philosophy, especially by the conceptual framework of possible worlds. On his retirement in 1988, the Centre organized an international conference "Fictions and Worlds".

Doležel presented papers at many North American and European universities and international conferences. He was visiting professor at the University of Amsterdam, LMU Munich and Charles University. He published numerous papers on the history of poetics, narratology and fictional semantics, and a couple of books on the same subjects.

He died on 28 January 2017 in Verona, Italy.

== Works ==
- O stylu moderní české prózy (On the Style of Modern Czech Prose Fiction), 1960
- Narrative Modes in Czech Literature, 1973 (revised edition in Czech 1993)
- Occidental Poetics: Tradition and Progress, 1990
- Heterocosmica: Fiction and Possible Worlds, 1997
- Possible Worlds of Fiction and History: The Postmodern Stage, 2010.
