= František Trávníček =

Czech Slavist and Bohemist

Professor František Trávníček
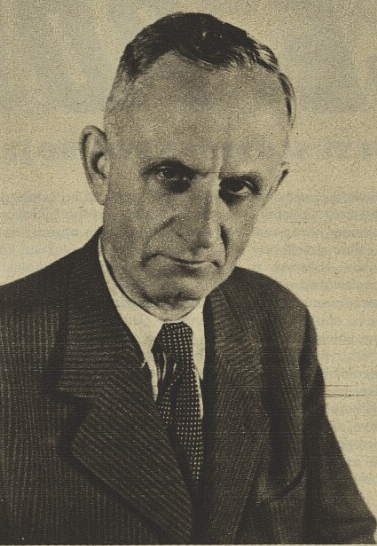
- František Trávníček in 1948
- Born: 17 August 1888; Spešov, Moravia, Austria-Hungary
- Died: 6 June 1961 (aged 72); Brno, Czechoslovakia
- Awards: Order of the Republic

Academic background
- Education: Charles University

Academic work
- School or tradition: Prague linguistic circle Structuralism
- Institutions: Charles University; Masaryk University; Czechoslovak Academy of Sciences
- Main interests: Slavonics and Czech studies

František Trávníček (17 August 1888 – 6 June 1961) was a Czech Slavist and Bohemist. He was a professor of the Czech language at Masaryk University and an academician of the Czechoslovak Academy of Sciences. After February 1948, he was also a politician of the Communist Party of Czechoslovakia and promoted Marxist interpretations of linguistics.

== Biography ==
Trávníček was born in to a middle-class family. He lost his parents at an early age and was raised by his grandparents.

In the years 1907–1911, he studied Slavic and Indo-European studies at the Faculty of Arts of Charles University. He was especially influenced by his meeting with the Russian Slavist and dialectologist Aleksey Shakhmatov. After graduating from university, he taught at a secondary school in Prague.

From 1911 to 1915 he was secretary of the Dialectological Commission of the Czech Academy of Sciences and Arts in Prague.

In 1915 he was sent to the Russian front. He surrendered and rose to the rank of staff captain of the Czechoslovak legions and became the editor of the Československé listy newspaper.

In 1920 he passed a habilitation at the Charles University. From 1921 to 1927 he was a visiting professor of Czech grammar at the University of Brno. In 1927, he received the title of ordinary professor there.

In 1945 he joined the Communist Party of Czechoslovakia. After 1948, he took a critical position in relation to structuralism in Czech linguistics, although before and during the Second World War he was an adherent of structuralism, as well as a member of the Prague linguistic circle in the 1950s he criticized structuralism from a Marxist position.

From 1948 to 1959 he was rector of Masaryk University, at the same time was a member of parliament (1948–1960).

He founded the Brno branch of the Institute of Czech Language of the Czechoslovak Academy of Sciences and was its first director.

== Works ==
- Studie o českém vidu slovesném, 1923.
- Moravská nářečí, 1926.
- Jazyk a národ, 1930.
- Neslovesné věty v češtině. Díl I, Věty interjekční, 1930.
- Neslovesné věty v češtině. Díl 2., Věty nominální, 1931.
- Historická mluvnice československá, 1935.
- Spisovná česká výslovnost. 2. vydání, 1940.
- Stručná mluvnice česká. 1. vyd. 1941, další 1943, 1945.
- Mluvnice spisovné češtiny. Část I., Hláskosloví, tvoření slov, tvarosloví. 1. vyd. 1948, další 1949, 1951.
  - V roce 1948 poctěno Státní cenou.
- Mluvnice spisovné češtiny. Část 2, Skladba. 1. vyd. 1949, další 1951.
- Český jazykozpytný strukturalismus ve světle Stalinova učení o jazyce, 1951.
- O jazyce naší nové prózy, 1954.
- Historická mluvnice česká 3. Skladba. 1. vyd. 1956, další 1962.
