= Nučice =

Nučice may refer to places in the Czech Republic:

- Nučice (Prague-East District), a municipality and village in the Central Bohemian Region
- Nučice (Prague-West District), a municipality and village in the Central Bohemian Region
