= Variable (mathematics) =

Symbol representing a mathematical object

In mathematics, a variable (from Latin variabilis 'changeable') is a symbol, typically a letter, that refers to an unspecified mathematical object. One says colloquially that the variable represents or denotes the object, and that any valid candidate for the object is the value of the variable. The values a variable can take are usually of the same kind, often numbers. More specifically, the values involved may form a set, such as the set of real numbers.

The object may not always exist, or it might be uncertain whether any valid candidate exists or not. For example, one could represent two integers by the variables p and q and require that the value of the square of p is twice the square of q, which in algebraic notation can be written p^{2} = 2 q^{2}. A definitive proof that this relationship is impossible to satisfy when p and q are restricted to nonzero integers isn't obvious, but it has been known since ancient times and has had a big influence on mathematics ever since.

Originally, the term variable was used primarily for the argument of a function, in which case its value could be thought of as varying within the domain of the function. This is the motivation for the choice of the term. Also, variables are used for denoting values of functions, such as the symbol y in the equation y = f(x), where x is the argument and f denotes the function itself.

A variable may represent an unspecified number that remains fixed during the resolution of a problem; in which case, it is often called a parameter. A variable may denote an unknown number that has to be determined; in which case, it is called an unknown; for example, in the quadratic equation ax^{2} + bx + c = 0, the variables a, b, c are parameters, and x is the unknown.

Sometimes the same symbol can be used to denote both a variable and a constant, that is a well defined mathematical object. For example, the Greek letter π generally represents the number π, but has also been used to denote a projection. Similarly, the letter e often denotes Euler's number, but has been used to denote an unassigned coefficient for quartic function and higher degree polynomials. Even the symbol 1 has been used to denote an identity element of an arbitrary field. These two notions are used almost identically, therefore one usually must be told whether a given symbol denotes a variable or a constant.

Variables are often used for representing matrices, functions, their arguments, sets and their elements, vectors, spaces, etc.

In mathematical logic, a variable is a symbol that either represents an unspecified constant of the theory, or is being quantified over.

== History ==
=== Early history ===
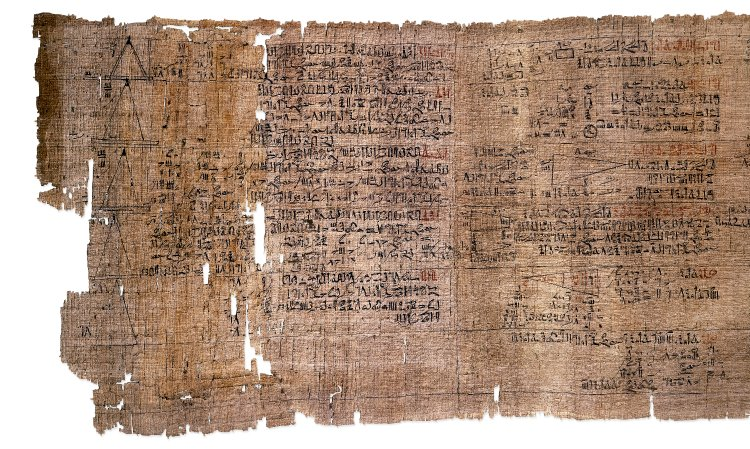
Rhind Mathematical Papyrus

The earliest uses of an "unknown quantity" date back to at least the Ancient Egyptians with the Moscow Mathematical Papyrus (c. 1500 BC) which described problems with unknowns rhetorically, called the "Aha problems". The "Aha problems" involve finding unknown quantities (referred to as aha, "stack") if the sum of the quantity and part(s) of it are given (The Rhind Mathematical Papyrus also contains four of these types of problems). For example, problem 19 asks one to calculate a quantity taken 1 1/2 times and added to 4 to make 10. In modern mathematical notation: 3/2x + 4 = 10. Around the same time in Mesopotamia, mathematics of the Old Babylonian period (c. 2000 BC – 1500 BC) was more advanced, also studying quadratic and cubic equations.

A page from Euclid's Elements

In works of ancient Greece such as Euclid's Elements (c. 300 BC), mathematics was described geometrically. For example, The Elements, proposition 1 of Book II, Euclid includes the proposition:

"If there be two straight lines, and one of them be cut into any number of segments whatever, the rectangle contained by the two straight lines is equal to the rectangles contained by the uncut straight line and each of the segments."

This corresponds to the algebraic identity a(b + c) = ab + ac (distributivity), but is described entirely geometrically. Euclid, and other greek geometers, also used single letters refer to geometric points and shapes. This kind of algebra is now sometimes called Greek geometric algebra.

Diophantus of Alexandria, pioneered a form of syncopated algebra in his Arithmetica (c. 200 AD), which introduced symbolic manipulation of expressions with unknowns and powers, but without modern symbols for relations (such as equality or inequality) or exponents. An unknown number was called $\zeta$. The square of $\zeta$ was $\Delta^v$; the cube was $K^v$; the fourth power was $\Delta^v\Delta$; and the fifth power was $\Delta K^v$. So for example, what would be written in modern notation as:
$$x^3 - 2x^2 + 10x -1,$$
would be written in Diophantus's syncopated notation as:
$$\Kappa^{\upsilon} \overline{\alpha} \; \zeta \overline{\iota} \;\, \pitchfork \;\, \Delta^{\upsilon} \overline{\beta} \; \Mu \overline{\alpha} \,\;$$

In the 7th century BC, Brahmagupta used different colours to represent the unknowns in algebraic equations in the Brāhmasphuṭasiddhānta. One section of this book is called "Equations of Several Colours". Greek and other ancient mathematical advances, were often trapped in long periods of stagnation, and so there were few revolutions in notation, but this began to change by the early modern period.

=== Early modern period ===
At the end of the 16th century, François Viète introduced the idea of representing known and unknown numbers by letters, nowadays called variables, and the idea of computing with them as if they were numbers—in order to obtain the result by a simple replacement. Viète's convention was to use consonants for known values, and vowels for unknowns.

In 1637, René Descartes "invented the convention of representing unknowns in equations by x, y, and z, and knowns by a, b, and c". Contrarily to Viète's convention, Descartes' is still commonly in use. The history of the letter x in math was discussed in an 1887 Scientific American article.

Starting in the 1660s, Isaac Newton and Gottfried Wilhelm Leibniz independently developed the infinitesimal calculus, which essentially consists of studying how an infinitesimal variation of a time-varying quantity, called a Fluent, induces a corresponding variation of another quantity which is a function of the first variable. Almost a century later, Leonhard Euler fixed the terminology of infinitesimal calculus, and introduced the notation y = f(x) for a function f, its variable x and its value y. Until the end of the 19th century, the word variable referred almost exclusively to the arguments and the values of functions.

In the second half of the 19th century, it appeared that the foundation of infinitesimal calculus was not formalized enough to deal with apparent paradoxes such as a nowhere differentiable continuous function. To solve this problem, Karl Weierstrass introduced a new formalism consisting of replacing the intuitive notion of limit by a formal definition. The older notion of limit was "when the variable x varies and tends toward a, then f(x) tends toward L", without any accurate definition of "tends". Weierstrass replaced this sentence by the formula
$$(\forall \epsilon >0) (\exists \eta >0) (\forall x) \;|x-a|<\eta  \; \Rightarrow |L-f(x)|<\epsilon,$$
in which none of the five variables is considered as varying.

This static formulation led to the modern notion of variable, which is simply a symbol representing a mathematical object that either is unknown, or may be replaced by any element of a given set (e.g., the set of real numbers).

== Notation ==
Variables are generally denoted by a single letter, most often from the Latin alphabet and less often from the Greek, which may be lowercase or capitalized. The letter may be followed by a subscript: a number (as in x_{2}), another variable (x_{i}), a word or abbreviation of a word as a label (x_{total}) or a mathematical expression (x_{2i+1}). Under the influence of computer science, some variable names in pure mathematics consist of several letters and digits. Following René Descartes (1596–1650), letters at the beginning of the alphabet such as a, b, c are commonly used for known values and parameters, and letters at the end of the alphabet such as x, y, z are commonly used for unknowns and variables of functions. In printed mathematics, the norm is to set variables and constants in an italic typeface.

For example, a general quadratic function is conventionally written as ax^{2} + bx + c, where a, b and c are parameters (also called constants, because they are constant functions), while x is the variable of the function. A more explicit way to denote this function is x ↦ ax^{2} + bx + c, which clarifies the function-argument status of x and the constant status of a, b and c. Since c occurs in a term that is a constant function of x, it is called the constant term.

Specific branches and applications of mathematics have specific naming conventions for variables. Variables with similar roles or meanings are often assigned consecutive letters or the same letter with different subscripts. For example, the three axes in 3D coordinate space are conventionally called x, y, and z. In physics, the names of variables are largely determined by the physical quantity they describe, but various naming conventions exist. A convention often followed in probability and statistics is to use X, Y, Z for the names of random variables, keeping x, y, z for variables representing corresponding better-defined values.

=== Conventional variable names ===
- a, b, c, d (sometimes extended to e, f) for parameters or coefficients
- a_{0}, a_{1}, a_{2}, ... for situations where distinct letters are inconvenient
- a_{i} or u_{i} for the ith term of a sequence or the ith coefficient of a series
- f, g, h for functions (as in f(x))
- i, j, k (sometimes l or h) for varying integers or indices in an indexed family, or unit vectors
- l and w for the length and width of a figure
- l also for a line, or in number theory for a prime number not equal to p
- n (with m as a second choice) for a fixed integer, such as a count of objects or the degree of a polynomial
- p for a prime number or a probability
- q for a prime power or a quotient
- r for a radius, a remainder or a correlation coefficient
- t for time
- x, y, z for the three Cartesian coordinates of a point in Euclidean geometry or the corresponding axes
- z for a complex number, or in statistics a normal random variable
- α, β, γ, θ, φ for angle measures
- ε (with δ as a second choice) for an arbitrarily small positive number
- λ for an eigenvalue
- Σ (uppercase sigma) for a sum, or σ (lowercase sigma) in statistics for the standard deviation
- μ for a mean

== Specific kinds of variables ==
It is common for variables to play different roles in the same mathematical formula, and names or qualifiers have been introduced to distinguish them. For example, the general cubic equation
$$ax^3+bx^2+cx+d=0$$
is interpreted as having five variables: four, a, b, c, d, which are taken to be given numbers and the fifth variable, x, is understood to be an unknown number. To distinguish them, the variable x is called an unknown, and the other variables are called parameters or coefficients, or sometimes constants, although this last terminology is incorrect for an equation, and should be reserved for the function defined by the left-hand side of this equation.

In the context of functions, the term variable refers commonly to the arguments of the functions. This is typically the case in sentences like "function of a real variable", "x is the variable of the function f : x ↦ f(x)", "f is a function of the variable x" (meaning that the argument of the function is referred to by the variable x).

In the same context, variables that are independent of x define constant functions and are therefore called constant. For example, a constant of integration is an arbitrary constant function that is added to a particular antiderivative to obtain the other antiderivatives. Because of the strong relationship between polynomials and polynomial functions, the term "constant" is often used to denote the coefficients of a polynomial, which are constant functions of the indeterminates.

Other specific names for variables are:

- An unknown is a variable in an equation which has to be solved for.
- An indeterminate is a symbol, commonly called variable, that appears in a polynomial or a formal power series. Formally speaking, an indeterminate is not a variable, but a constant in the polynomial ring or the ring of formal power series. However, because of the strong relationship between polynomials or power series and the functions that they define, many authors consider indeterminates as a special kind of variables.
- A parameter is a quantity (usually a number) which is a part of the input of a problem, and remains constant during the whole solution of this problem. For example, in mechanics the mass and the size of a solid body are parameters for the study of its movement. In computer science, parameter has a different meaning and denotes an argument of a function.
- Free variables and bound variables
- A random variable is a kind of variable that is used in probability theory and its applications.

All these denominations of variables are of semantic nature, and the way of computing with them (syntax) is the same for all.

=== Dependent and independent variables ===
In calculus and its application to physics and other sciences, it is rather common to consider a variable, say y, whose possible values depend on the value of another variable, say x. In mathematical terms, the dependent variable y represents the value of a function of x. To simplify formulas, it is often useful to use the same symbol for the dependent variable y and the function mapping x onto y. For example, the state of a physical system depends on measurable quantities such as the pressure, the temperature, the spatial position, ..., and all these quantities vary when the system evolves, that is, they are function of the time. In the formulas describing the system, these quantities are represented by variables which are dependent on the time, and thus considered implicitly as functions of the time.

Therefore, in a formula, a dependent variable is a variable that is implicitly a function of another (or several other) variables. An independent variable is a variable that is not dependent.

The property of a variable to be dependent or independent depends often of the point of view and is not intrinsic. For example, in the notation f(x, y, z), the three variables may be all independent and the notation represents a function of three variables. On the other hand, if y and z depend on x (are dependent variables) then the notation represents a function of the single independent variable x.

=== Examples ===
If one defines a function f from the real numbers to the real numbers by
$$f(x) = x^2+\sin(x+4)$$
then x is a variable standing for the argument of the function being defined, which can be any real number.

In the identity
$$\sum_{i=1}^n i = \frac{n^2+n}2$$
the variable i is a summation variable which designates in turn each of the integers 1, 2, ..., n (it is also called index because its variation is over a discrete set of values) while n is a parameter (it does not vary within the formula).

In the theory of polynomials, a polynomial of degree 2 is generally denoted as ax^{2} + bx + c, where a, b and c are called coefficients (they are assumed to be fixed, i.e., parameters of the problem considered) while x is called a variable. When studying this polynomial for its polynomial function this x stands for the function argument. When studying the polynomial as an object in itself, x is taken to be an indeterminate, and would often be written with a capital letter instead to indicate this status.

==== Example: the ideal gas law ====
Consider the equation describing the ideal gas law,
$$PV = Nk_\text{B}T.$$
This equation would generally be interpreted to have four variables, and one constant. The constant is k_{B}, the Boltzmann constant. One of the variables, N, the number of particles, is a positive integer (and therefore a discrete variable), while the other three, P, V and T, for pressure, volume and temperature, are continuous variables.

One could rearrange this equation to obtain P as a function of the other variables,
$$P(V, N, T) = \frac{Nk_\text{B}T}{V}.$$
Then P, as a function of the other variables, is the dependent variable, while its arguments, V, N and T, are independent variables. One could approach this function more formally and think about its domain and range: in function notation, here P is a function $P: \mathbb{R}_{>0} \times \mathbb{N} \times \mathbb{R}_{>0} \rightarrow \mathbb{R}$.

However, in an experiment, in order to determine the dependence of pressure on a single one of the independent variables, it is necessary to fix all but one of the variables, say T. This gives a function
$$P(T) = \frac{Nk_\text{B}T}{V},$$
where now N and V are also regarded as constants. Mathematically, this constitutes a partial application of the earlier function P.

This illustrates how independent variables and constants are largely dependent on the point of view taken. One could even regard k_{B} as a variable to obtain a function
$$P(V, N, T, k_\text{B}) = \frac{Nk_\text{B}T}{V}.$$

== Moduli spaces ==
Considering constants and variables can lead to the concept of moduli spaces. For illustration, consider the equation for a parabola,
$$y = ax^2 + bx + c,$$
where a, b, c, x and y are all considered to be real. The set of points (x, y) in the 2D plane satisfying this equation trace out the graph of a parabola. Here, a, b and c are regarded as constants, which specify the parabola, while x and y are variables.

Then instead regarding a, b and c as variables, we observe that each set of 3-tuples (a, b, c) corresponds to a different parabola. That is, they specify coordinates on the 'space of parabolas': this is known as a moduli space of parabolas.

== See also ==
- Lambda calculus
- Observable variable
- Physical constant
- Propositional variable

== Bibliography ==
- Edwards, Joseph (1892). An Elementary Treatise on the Differential Calculus (2nd ed.). London: MacMillan and Co.
- Foerster, Paul A. (2006). Algebra and Trigonometry: Functions and Applications (classics ed.). Upper Saddle River, NJ: Prentice Hall. ISBN 978-0-13-165711-3.
- Fraleigh, John B. (1989). A First Course in Abstract Algebra (4th ed.). United States: Addison-Wesley. ISBN 978-0-201-52821-3.
- Hosch, William L., ed. (2010). The Britannica Guide to Algebra and Trigonometry. Britannica Educational Publishing. ISBN 978-1-61530-219-2.
- Menger, Karl (1954). "On Variables in Mathematics and in Natural Science". The British Journal for the Philosophy of Science. 5 (18). University of Chicago Press: 134–142. doi:10.1093/bjps/V.18.134. JSTOR 685170.
- Peregrin, Jaroslav (2000). "Variables in Natural Language: Where do they come from?" (PDF). In Böttner, Michael; Thümmel, Wolf (eds.). Variable-Free Semantics. Osnabrück Secolo. pp. 46–65. ISBN 978-3-929979-53-4.
- Quine, Willard V. (1960). "Variables Explained Away" (PDF). Proceedings of the American Philosophical Society. 104 (3). American Philosophical Society: 343–347. JSTOR 985250.
- Sorell, Tom (2000). Descartes: A Very Short Introduction. New York: Oxford University Press. ISBN 978-0-19-285409-4.
- Stover, Christopher; Weisstein, Eric W. "Variable". In Weisstein, Eric W. (ed.). Wolfram MathWorld. Wolfram Research.
- Tabak, John (2014). Algebra: Sets, Symbols, and the Language of Thought. Infobase Publishing. ISBN 978-0-8160-6875-3.
