= Lesnice =

- Municipality
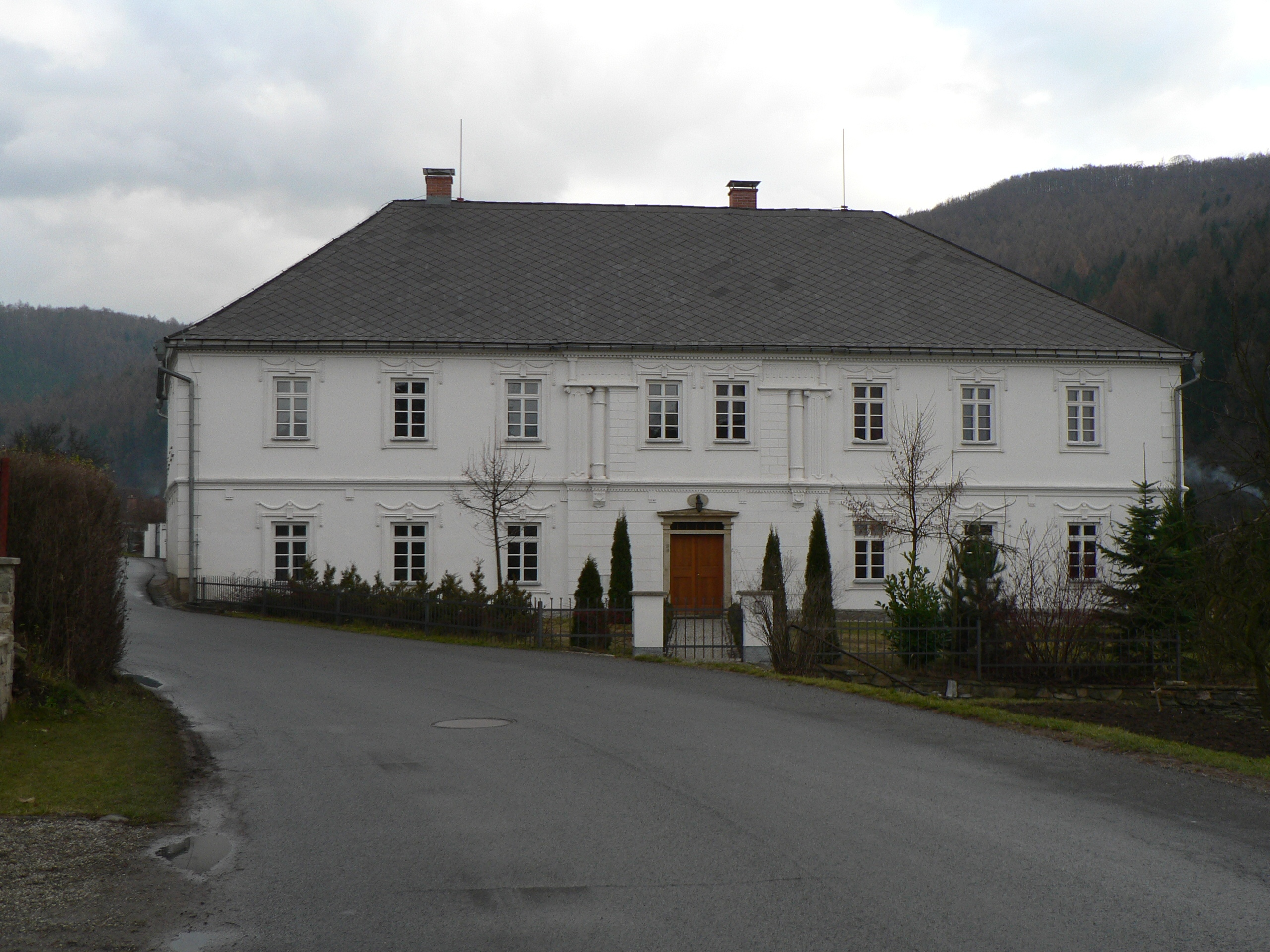
- Vogt's seat

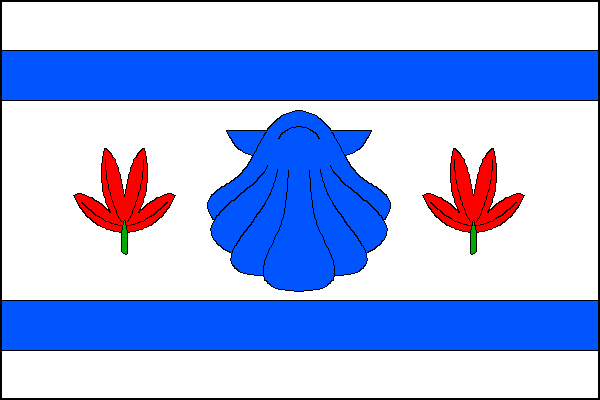
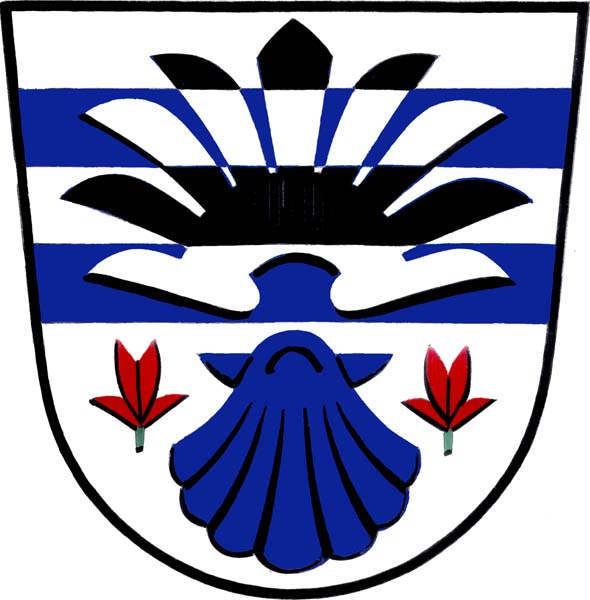
- Flag Coat of arms

- Location in the Czech Republic
- Coordinates: 49°53′2″N 16°56′29″E
- Country: Czech Republic
- Region: Olomouc
- District: Šumperk
- First mentioned: 1348

Area
  - Total: 7.33 km^{2} (2.83 sq mi)
- Elevation: 274 m (899 ft)

Population (2026-01-01)
  - Total: 627
  - Density: 85.5/km^{2} (222/sq mi)
- Time zone: UTC+1 (CET)
  - Summer (DST): UTC+2 (CEST)
- Postal codes: 789 01
- Website: www.lesnice.cz

Lesnice is a municipality and village in Šumperk District in the Olomouc Region of the Czech Republic. It has about 600 inhabitants.

Lesnice lies approximately 10 kilometres (6 mi) south of Šumperk, 39 km (24 mi) north-west of Olomouc, and 183 km (114 mi) east of Prague.

== Demographics ==
Historical population
Year	Pop.	±%
1869	604	—
1880	672	+11.3%
1890	757	+12.6%
1900	805	+6.3%
1910	880	+9.3%
1921	815	−7.4%
1930	845	+3.7%
1950	642	−24.0%
1961	636	−0.9%
1970	568	−10.7%
1980	549	−3.3%
1991	528	−3.8%
2001	583	+10.4%
2011	634	+8.7%
2021	615	−3.0%
Source: Censuses

== Notable people ==
- Lubomír Doležel (1922–2017), literary theorist
