= Ladislav Matějka =

Czech linguist

Ladislav Matějka (May 30, 1919 in České Budějovice – September 29, 2012 in West Newton, Massachusetts) was a Czech scholar of semiotics and linguistic theory, who translated and published many contributions to Prague linguistic circle theory. He received his doctorate in Charles University in Prague in 1948 and then emigrated to the U.S and earned a second doctorate from Harvard University. From 1956 until 1989 he taught at University of Michigan in the Slavic Department. In 1962, he founded Michigan Slavic Publications, a series that has published more than 100 volumes by authors such as Roman Jakobson and Nikolai Trubetzkoy.

From 1982-1993 he edited the series Cross Currents that published material by Milan Kundera, Josef Škvorecký and Czesław Miłosz. His academic correspondence has been deposited at Howard Gotlieb Archival Research Center, Boston University.

== Selected works ==
- Serbo-Croatian oral and written verbal art: contacts and conflicts. Rome: Edizioni dell'Ateneo, 1986.
- Readings in Russian poetics. M. M. Baxtin (Mikhail Bakhtin). Compiled by Ladislav Matejka. Ann Arbor: Dept. of Slavic Languages and Literatures, 1971.
- Language and literary theory: in honor of Ladislav Matejka. Benjamin A. Stolz, I. R. Titunik, Lubomír Doležel. Ann Arbor: Michigan Slavic Publications, 1984.
