= Jiří Levý =

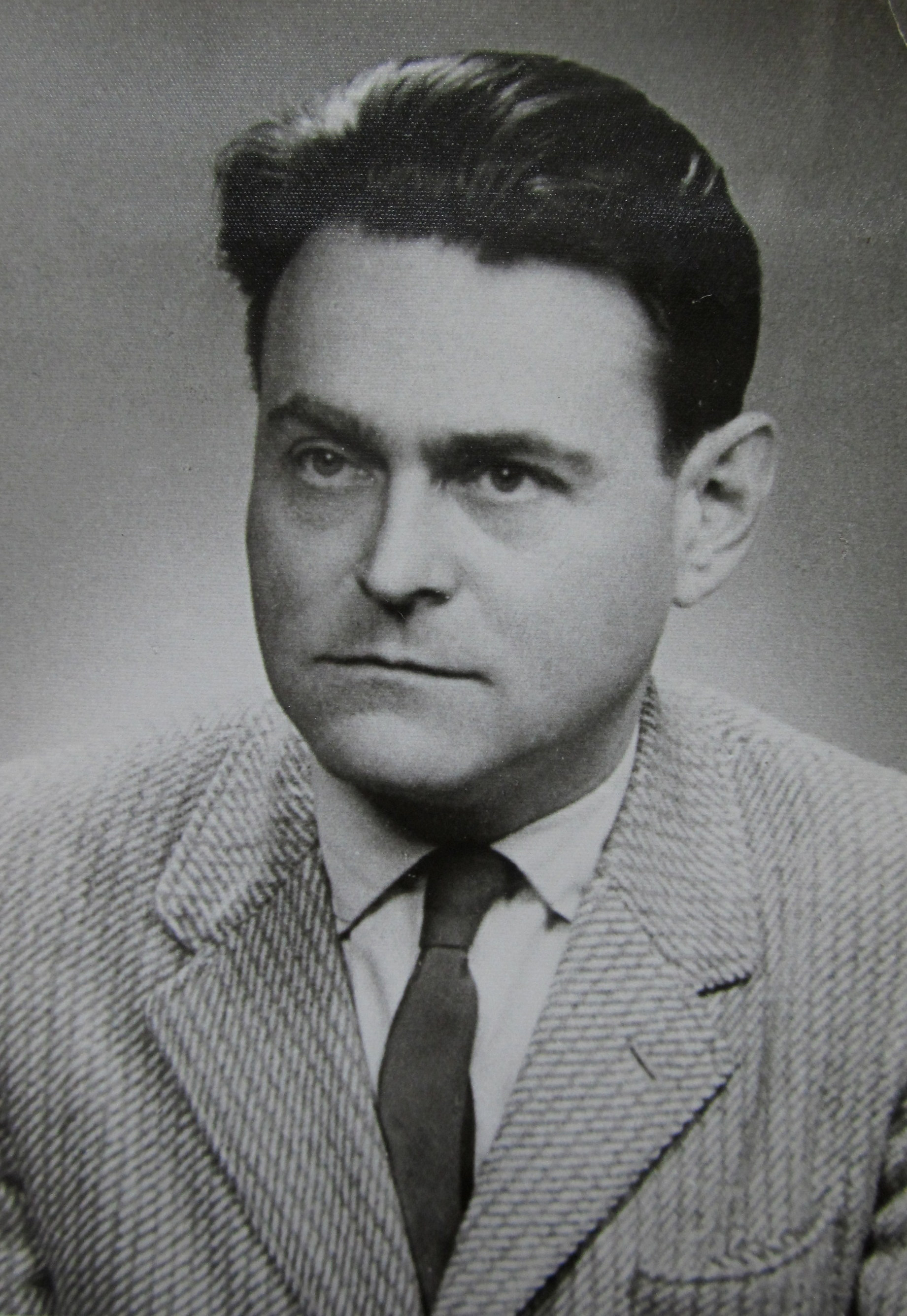
- Born: 8 August 1926; Košice, Czechoslovakia
- Died: 17 January 1967 (aged 40); Brno, Czechoslovakia

Academic background
- Education: Masaryk University, Brno
- Influences: Prague school of structural linguistics

Academic work
- Main interests: Literary translation
- Notable works: Umění překladu, 1963 (The Art of Translation)

Jiří Levý (Czech: [ˈjɪr̝iː ˈlɛviː]; 8 August 1926 – 17 January 1967) was a Czech literary theoretician, literary historian, and translation theoretician. Levý's work was crucial for the development of translation theory in Czechoslovakia, and it has subsequently influenced scholars internationally.

== Early life and career ==
Jiří Levý was born on 8 August 1926 in Košice (in eastern Slovakia), and he died on 17 January 1967 in Brno (in southern Moravia). Levý studied English and Czech at Masaryk University in Brno (graduated in 1949). From 1950 to 1963, he lectured at Palacký University of Olomouc. From 1964 onward, Levý worked at the Department of Czech Literature at Masaryk University in Brno. His theses include The Development of Translation Theories and Methods in Czech Literature (1957), Fundamental Problems of the Theory of Translation (1958), and Problems of Comparative Versification (1963).

Levý also lectured on the theory of translation abroad (e.g., in Dubrovnik, Warsaw, Hamburg, Vienna, and Stuttgart).

== Publications ==
Levý organized two conferences on the theory of verse. He founded the Group for Exact Methods and Interdisciplinary Relations. He was a member of the Union of Czechoslovak Writers, worked for the Translation Department of the Union of Czech Writers, and was a member of the International Federation of Translators.

Levý's first published volume, Czech Theories of Translation, includes his doctoral thesis The Development of Translation Theories and Methods in Czech Literature as well as a series of significant theorizing essays by Czech translators. Thus, the volume is concerned with translation norms from the 15th century until 1945.

Levý’s second volume, The Art of Translation, is a fundamental opus on the translation of "artistic literature" (belles lettres). It deals with the genesis and composition of literary translation. It places emphasis on the translation of poetry. It was translated into German in 1969, Russian in 1974, and Serbo-Croatian in 1982 (see above).

Levý was also concerned with the theory of verse. In many of his essays, he deals with the problems of verse translation ("Isochronism of Facts and Isosyllabism as Factors of the Poetic Rhythm", "Verse Rhythm as a Means of Dramatic Interpretation", "The Verse of the Czech Folk Poetry and its Echoes", "The Development of the Czech Theatre Blank-Verse", etc.).

Levý also wrote significant essays on T. S. Eliot, Walt Whitman, Ben Jonson, and others.

A collection of his essays titled Will the Study of Literature Become an Exact Science? appeared posthumously in 1971.

According to Levý, translation is a process of communication: the objective of translation is to give the knowledge of the original to the foreign reader. From the point of view of the working situation of the translator at any moment of his work, translating is a decision process. For example, the translator is given the following title to translate: Der gute Mensch. He or she can translate it in two variants: "The Good Man" or "The Good Woman."

== Key volumes ==
Levý, Jiří. 1957 (1996). České teorie překladu (Czech Theories of Translation). Prague.

Levý, Jiří. 1963 (1983, 1998, 2012). Umění překladu (The Art of Translation). Prague.

Levý, Jiří. 1971. Bude literární věda exaktní vědou? (Will the Study of Literature Become an Exact Science?). Prague: Československý spisovatel.

=== Volumes in English translation ===
Levý, Jiří (2011). The art of translation. Amsterdam: John Benjamins Pub. Co. ISBN 9789027224453.

=== Key articles in English and German ===
Levý, Jiří. 1964. Translation in Czechoslovakia. In: Babel 10(2): 73–76.

Levý, Jiří. 1965. Die Theorie des Verses – ihre matematische Aspekte. In: Matematik und Dichtung. Munich, pp. 211–231.

Levý, Jiří. 1966. Translation as a Decision Process. In: To Honor Roman Jakobson: Essays on the Occasion of his Seventieth Birthday. 11 October 1966. The Hague.

Levý, Jiří. 1967. Translation in Czechoslovakia. In: Ten Years of Translation – Proceedings of the Fourth Congress of the International Federation of Translators. Dubrovnik 1963. Oxford 1967. Pp. 211–218.

Levý, Jiří. 1969. Mathematical Aspects of the Theory of Verse. In: Statistics and Style. Ed. L. Doležel. New York, American Elsevier Publishing Company. Pp. 95–112.

Levý, Jiří. 1970. Generative Poetics. In: Sign, Language, Culture. The Hague, Mouton. Pp. 548–557.

Levý, Jiří. 1971. Generative Poetik. In: Literaturwissenschaft und Linguistik. Ergebnisse und Perspektiven II/2. Frankfurt am Main, Athenäum. Pp. 554–567.
