= Lazníky =

- Municipality
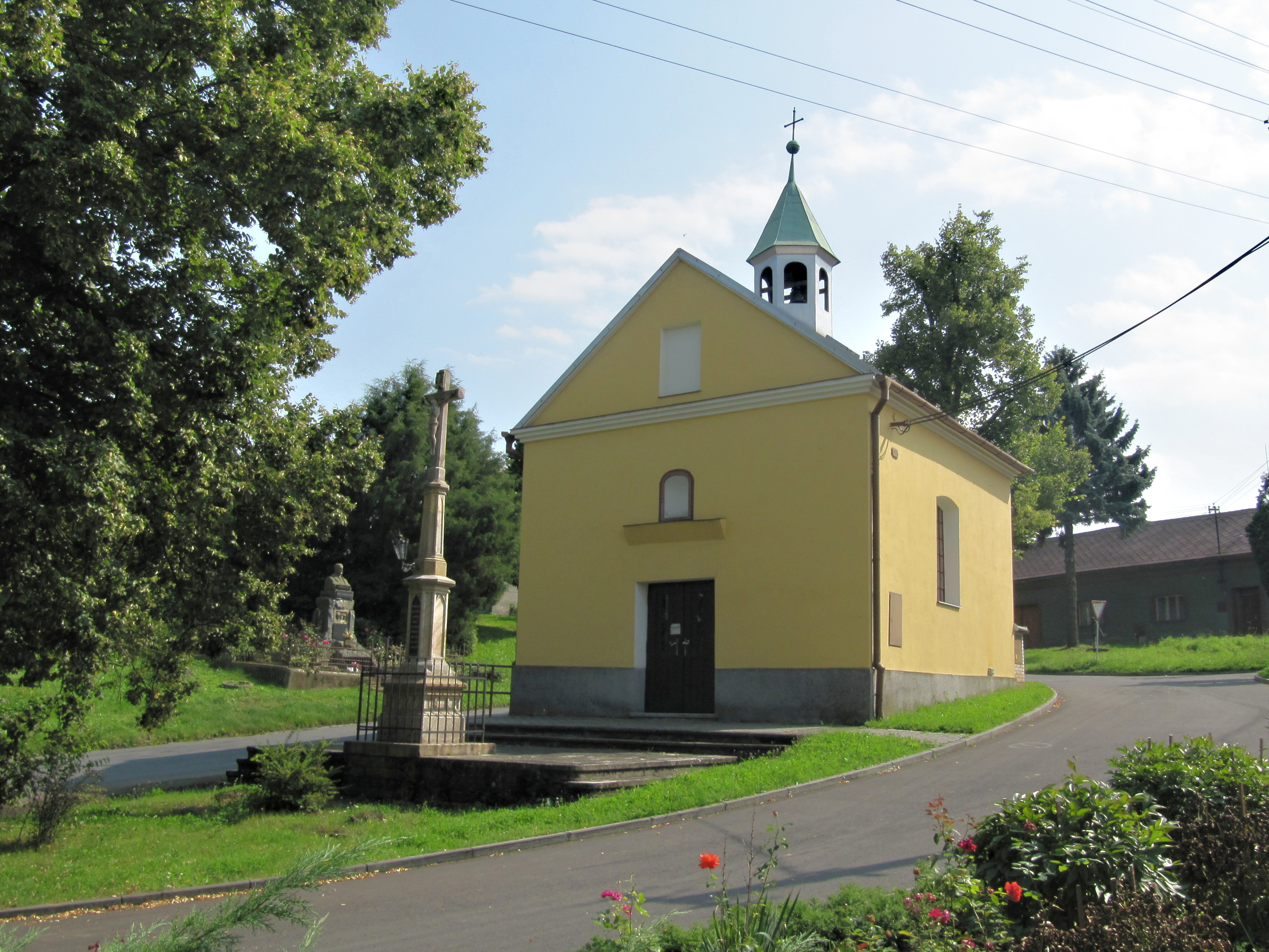
- Chapel of Saint Florian

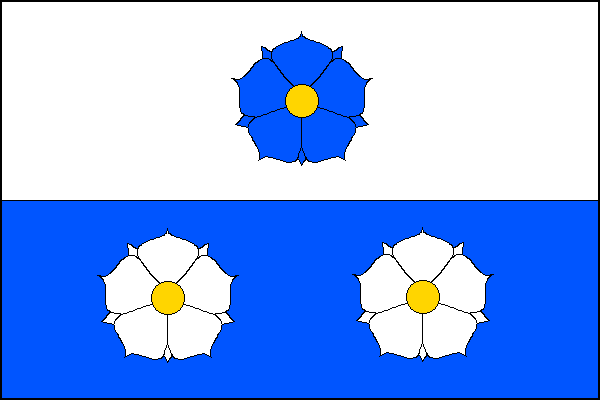
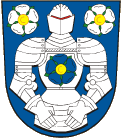
- Flag Coat of arms

- Location in the Czech Republic
- Coordinates: 49°31′28″N 17°27′46″E
- Country: Czech Republic
- Region: Olomouc
- District: Přerov
- First mentioned: 1355

Area
  - Total: 3.03 km^{2} (1.17 sq mi)
- Elevation: 290 m (950 ft)

Population (2026-01-01)
  - Total: 534
  - Density: 176/km^{2} (456/sq mi)
- Time zone: UTC+1 (CET)
  - Summer (DST): UTC+2 (CEST)
- Postal code: 751 25
- Website: www.lazniky.cz

Lazníky is a municipality and village in Přerov District in the Olomouc Region of the Czech Republic. It has about 500 inhabitants.

Lazníky lies approximately 8 kilometres (5 mi) north of Přerov, 18 km (11 mi) south-east of Olomouc, and 228 km (142 mi) east of Prague.

== Administrative division ==
Lazníky consists of two municipal parts (in brackets population according to the 2021 census):

- Lazníky (512)
- Svrčov (18)

== Demographics ==
Historical population
Year	Pop.	±%
1869	617	—
1880	605	−1.9%
1890	682	+12.7%
1900	644	−5.6%
1910	669	+3.9%
1921	686	+2.5%
1930	687	+0.1%
1950	604	−12.1%
1961	715	+18.4%
1970	630	−11.9%
1980	524	−16.8%
1991	462	−11.8%
2001	505	+9.3%
2011	516	+2.2%
2021	530	+2.7%
Source: Censuses

== Notable people ==
- Miroslav Komárek (1924–2013), historical linguist
