= Institute of the Czech Language =

Research institute at the Academy of Sciences of the Czech Republic

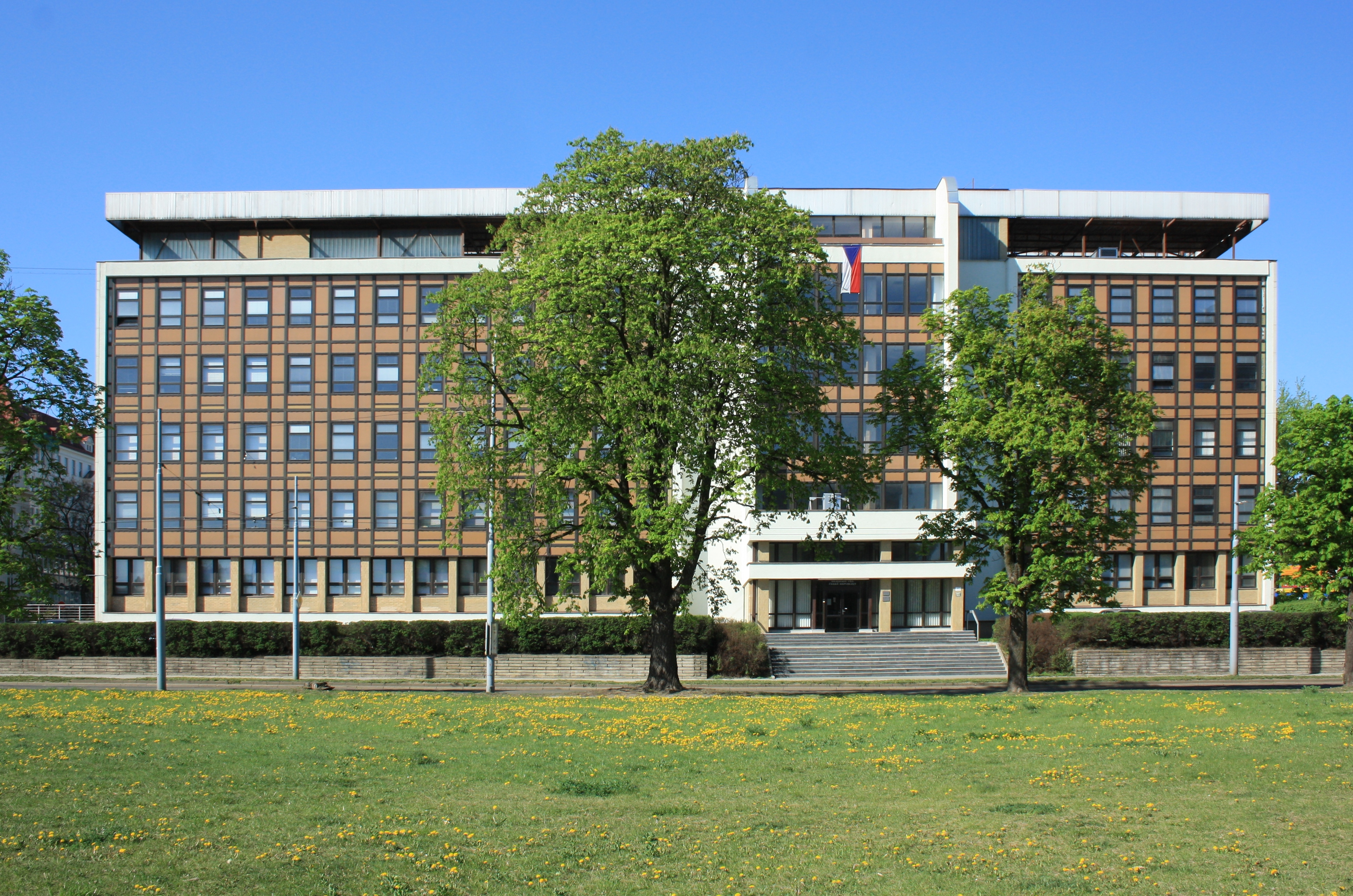
- Director: PhDr. Martin Prošek
- Address: Letenská 123/4, 118 00, Prague 1, Czech Republic
- Coordinates: 50°5′24.93″N 14°24′30.53″E
- Interactive map of Institute of the Czech Language
- Website: ujc.avcr.cz

The Institute of the Czech Language (Czech: Ústav pro jazyk český; ÚJČ) is a scientific institution dedicated to the study of the Czech language. It is one of the institutes of the Academy of Sciences of the Czech Republic. Its headquarters are in Prague and it has a branch in Brno.

The institute was created in 1946, by transformation of the former Office for the Czech Lexicon (Kancelář Slovníku jazyka českého), founded in 1911 by the former Czech Academy of Sciences and Arts. In 1953 it became a part of the Czechoslovak Academy of Sciences and became a public research institution in 2007.

In the Czech Republic, the institute is widely accepted as the regulatory body of the Czech language. Its recommendations on standard Czech (spisovná čeština) are viewed as binding by the educational system, newspapers and others, although this has no legal basis.

The institute's rich publishing activity has two main branches, firstly scientific monographies, magazines (Naše řeč, Slovo a slovesnost) and articles, that could be viewed as conversation between bohemists themselves, discussing matters of the Czech language. Secondly, what could be considered output of these discussions, is a consistent set of rules on vocabulary, grammar and orthography. Of the recommendations published most weight carry those, to which the institute itself assigns "codification status": monolingual dictionaries of the Czech language, Slovník spisovného jazyka českého and Slovník spisovné češtiny pro školu a veřejnost, and the orthography manual Pravidla českého pravopisu. The recommendations published in new editions of these are usually subsequently accepted by a ministry of education to be used in schools. The publication of new editions has often been a source of heated debate and national controversy, as recently as 1993.

There have been unsuccessful attempts to enshrine the position of the Czech language and its minders in legislation, akin to the Language law of Slovakia.

== History ==
A key year in the history of the Czech Language Institute was 1891, when the country's leading research institution – the Czech Academy of Sciences and Arts – was founded. Similarly to analogous institutions around the world, the Academy's fundamental task was to compile a large explanatory dictionary of the national language. In 1906, František Pastrnek, leading lexicographer František Štěpán Kott and Josef Zubatý submitted a proposal to initiate preparatory work on the dictionary. To assess the proposal, the Academy set up a Class III Commission, whose efforts culminated in the founding of the oldest academy department – the Office of the Dictionary of the Czech Language – in 1911. The Office immediately began collecting lexical material for a Czech Language Handbook, which was published as individual volumes starting in 1935 until the completion of the series with the ninth volume in 1957.

After World War II the Office was transformed into an institute and its tasks were expanded to include research about Czech dialects, Czech language history and the issue of contemporary standard language. This marked the establishment of the Czech Language Institute in 1946, with the then-Chancellor Alois Získal serving as its first director.

In late 1952 the Institute's Brno office established a dialectology department, along with an etymology department on the initiative of Václav Machek. After the founding of the Czechoslovak Academy of Sciences in 1952, the Czech Language Institute was incorporated into its structure and became one of its cornerstone departments. Bohuslav Havránek, one of the founders of the Prague Linguistic Circle, served as director until 1965. A number of leading Czech linguists subsequently led the Institute: František Daneš, Miloš Dokulil, Karel Horálek and Jan Petr. Following the 1989 Velvet Revolution, Fratišek Daneš once again assumed the directorship. Jiří Kraus succeeded him, serving from 1994 to 2002, Karel Oliva headed the Institute from 2003 to 2016 and since 2016 Martin Prošek has been the director.

Since 1992 the Czech Language Institute has been part of the newly transformed Academy of Sciences of the Czech Republic.

In 2011 the Czech Language Institute celebrated the 100th anniversary of the founding of the Office of the Dictionary of the Czech Language.

== Departments ==
Up until 2023, the Institute consists of 8 academic departments:

- The Department of Dialectology studies dialects and colloquial language in Bohemia, Moravia and Silesia.
- The Department of Etymology’s main tasks are uncovering the origins of words and compiling an Etymological Dictionary of the Old Church Slavonic Language.
- The Department of Grammar focuses on research and description of the grammatical structure of the Czech language, descriptive methodology and corpus linguistics theory and practice.
- The Department of Language Cultivation addresses language cultivation theory and practice and operates a language consultation centre.
- The Department of Onomastics conducts research into proper nouns.
- The Department of Contemporary Lexicology and Lexicography’s main tasks are development of a new lexicon of contemporary Czech and continuous monitoring and recording of new phenomena in vocabulary.
- The Department of Stylistics and Sociolinguistics examines the use of language in society and develops theories of texts, style, genres and discourse.
- The Department of Language Development focuses on research into the history of the Czech language from its inception through the national revival period.

== Journals ==
Another core activity is publishing of science and popular science periodicals:

- Slovo a slovesnost, a scientific journal focusing on all areas of structural linguistics as well as issues of language variation, style and language cultivation;
- Naše řeč (English: Our Speech), a peer-reviewed scientific journal devoted to Czech as a mother tongue;
- Acta onomastica, the only Czech peer-reviewed scientific periodical dealing with the field of proper names;
- Corpus – Grammar – Axiology Journal (KGA) (Czech: Korpus – gramatika – axiologie), a peer-reviewed academic journal focused on corpus research in natural languages.

== See also ==
- List of language regulators
