= Úbislavice =

- Municipality
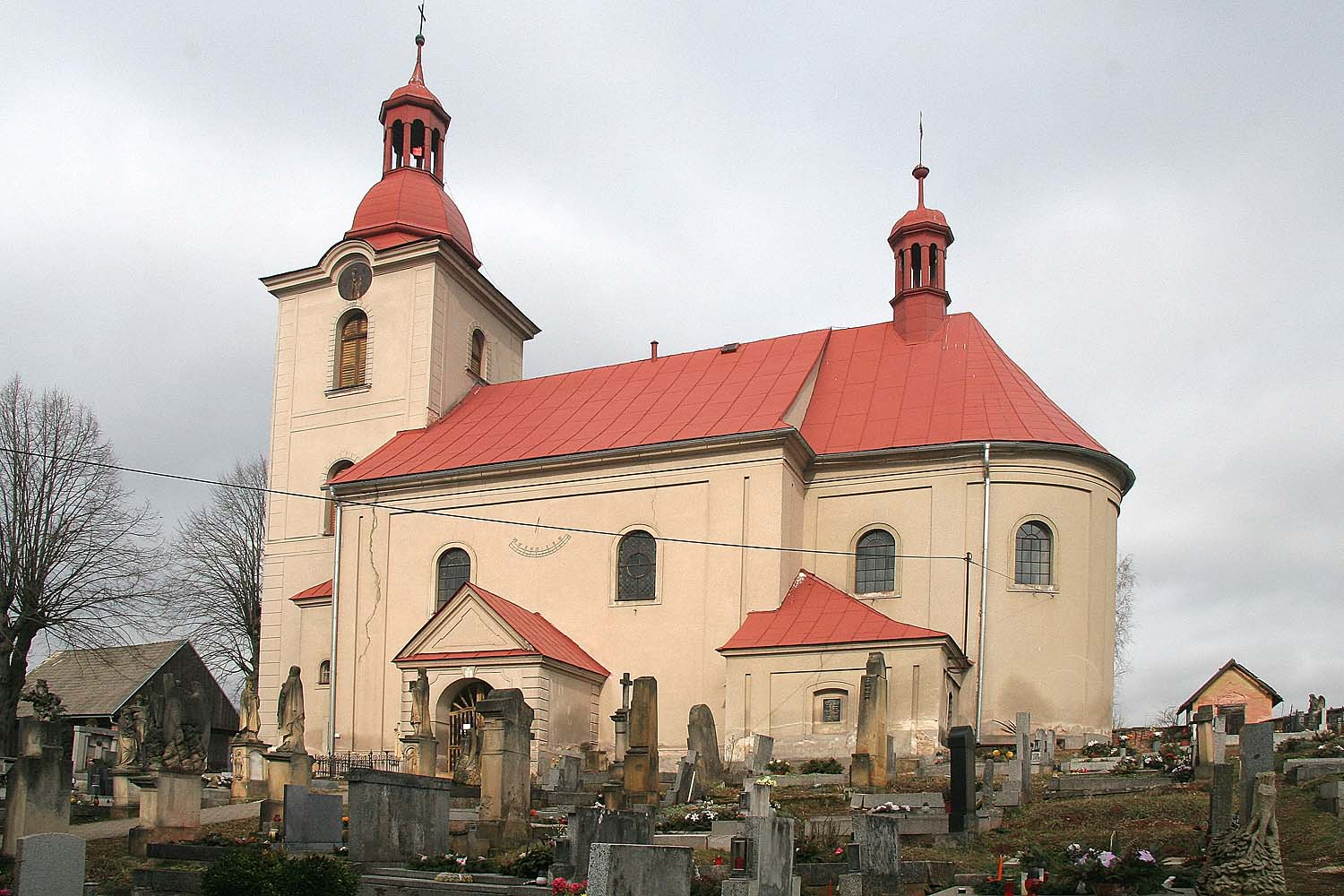
- Church of the Nativity of the Virgin Mary

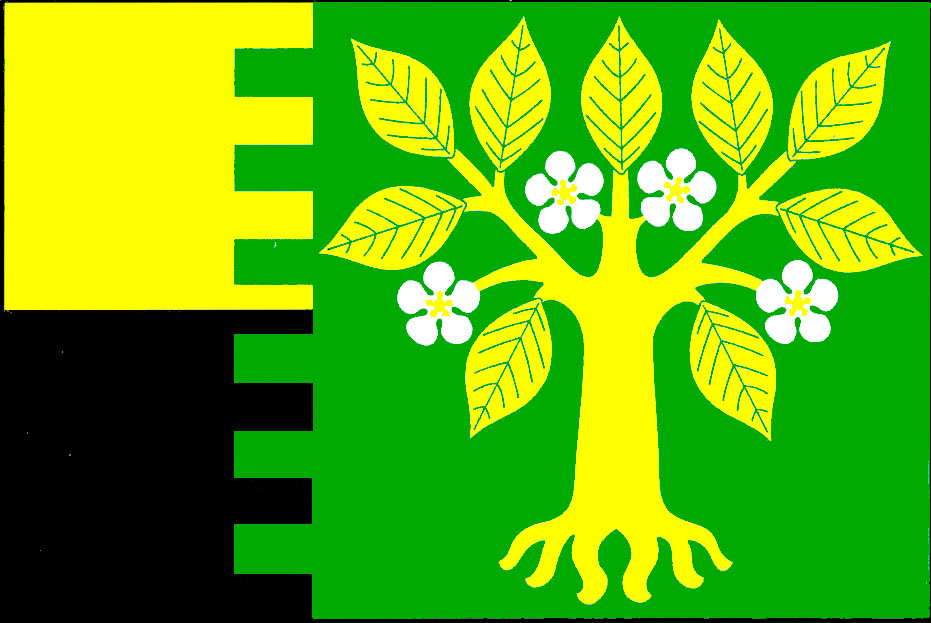
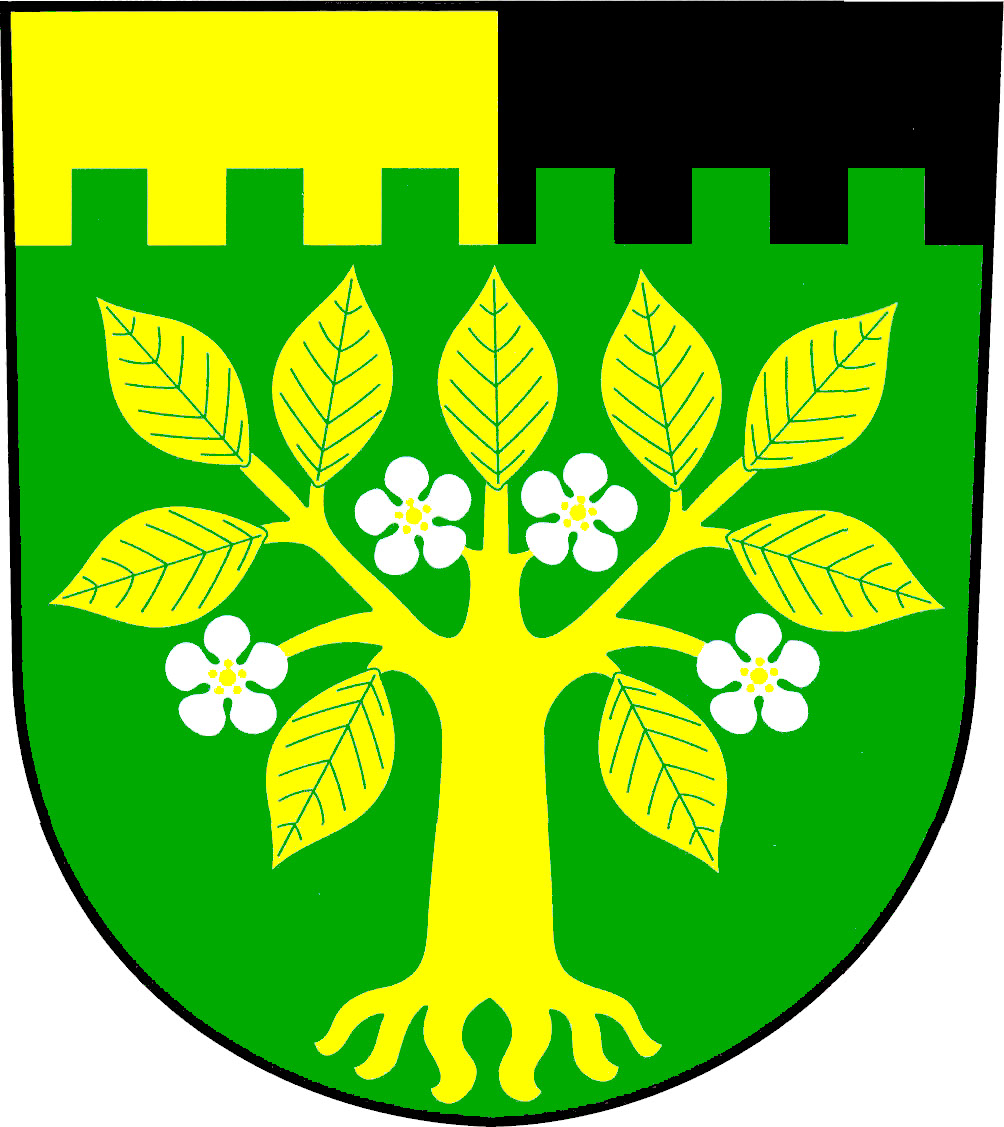
- Flag Coat of arms

- Location in the Czech Republic
- Coordinates: 50°28′23″N 15°28′13″E
- Country: Czech Republic
- Region: Hradec Králové
- District: Jičín
- First mentioned: 1357

Area
  - Total: 12.08 km^{2} (4.66 sq mi)
- Elevation: 328 m (1,076 ft)

Population (2026-01-01)
  - Total: 490
  - Density: 41/km^{2} (110/sq mi)
- Time zone: UTC+1 (CET)
  - Summer (DST): UTC+2 (CEST)
- Postal codes: 507 92, 509 01
- Website: www.ubislavice.cz

Úbislavice is a municipality and village in Jičín District in the Hradec Králové Region of the Czech Republic. It has about 500 inhabitants.

== Administrative division ==
Úbislavice consists of six municipal parts (in brackets population according to the 2021 census):

- Úbislavice (184)
- Česká Proseč (31)
- Chloumek (12)
- Stav (115)
- Štěpanice (24)
- Zboží (89)

== Demographics ==
Historical population
Year	Pop.	±%
1869	1,858	—
1880	1,642	−11.6%
1890	1,585	−3.5%
1900	1,428	−9.9%
1910	1,309	−8.3%
1921	1,224	−6.5%
1930	1,078	−11.9%
1950	755	−30.0%
1961	661	−12.5%
1970	527	−20.3%
1980	423	−19.7%
1991	354	−16.3%
2001	346	−2.3%
2011	377	+9.0%
2021	455	+20.7%
Source: Censuses

== Notable people ==
- Jan Gebauer (1838–1907), Czech studies expert
- Věra Janoušková (1922–2010), sculptor and graphic artist
