= Spešov =

- Municipality
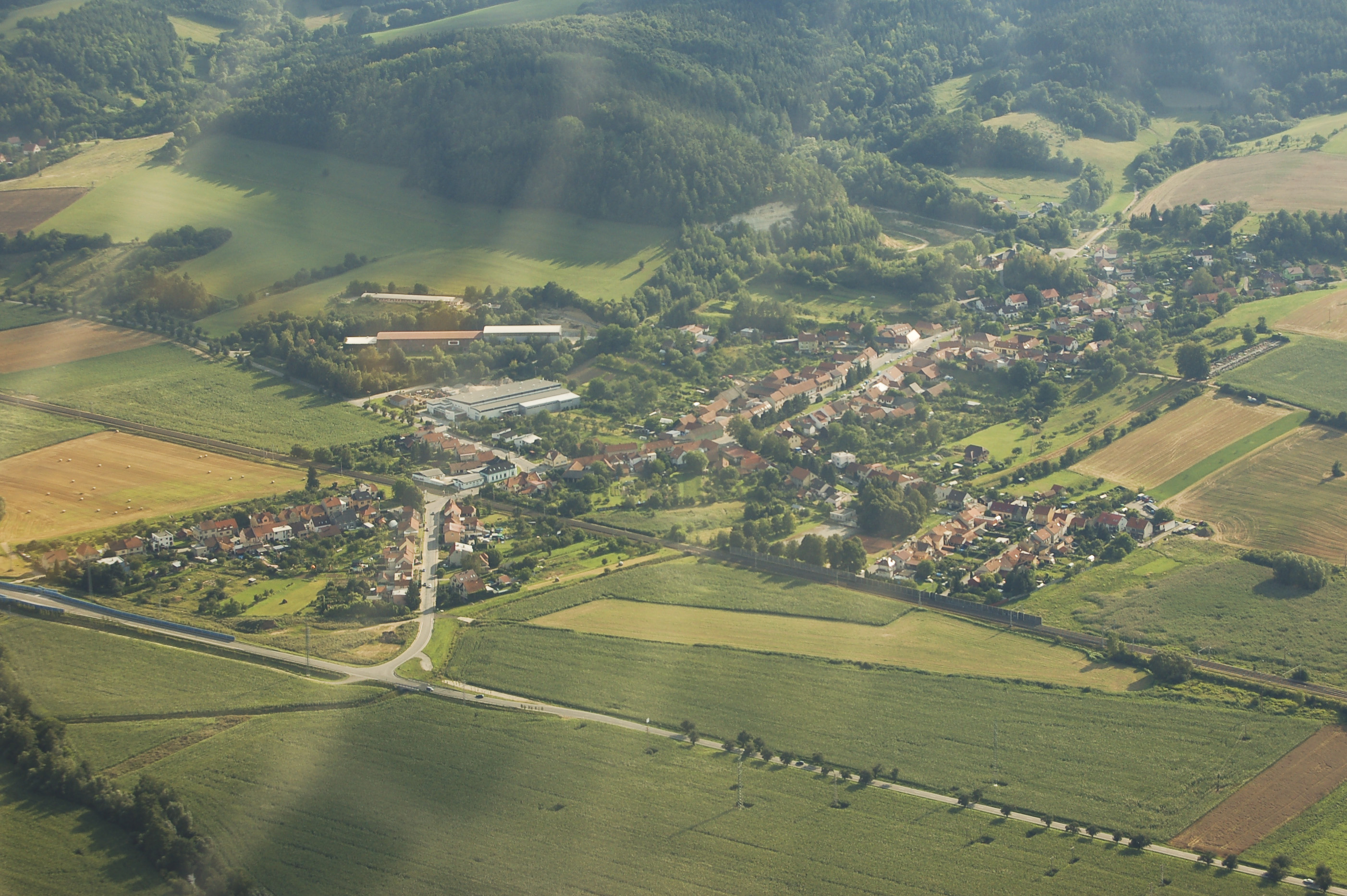
- Aerial view

- Flag Coat of arms

- Location in the Czech Republic
- Coordinates: 49°23′41″N 16°37′46″E
- Country: Czech Republic
- Region: South Moravian
- District: Blansko
- First mentioned: 1373

Area
  - Total: 3.31 km^{2} (1.28 sq mi)
- Elevation: 285 m (935 ft)

Population (2026-01-01)
  - Total: 648
  - Density: 196/km^{2} (507/sq mi)
- Time zone: UTC+1 (CET)
  - Summer (DST): UTC+2 (CEST)
- Postal code: 679 02
- Website: www.spesov.cz

Spešov is a municipality and village in Blansko District in the South Moravian Region of the Czech Republic. It has about 600 inhabitants.

Spešov lies approximately 4 kilometres (2 mi) north-west of Blansko, 22 km (14 mi) north of Brno, and 177 km (110 mi) south-east of Prague.

== Demographics ==
Historical population
Year	Pop.	±%
1869	359	—
1880	396	+10.3%
1890	420	+6.1%
1900	445	+6.0%
1910	473	+6.3%
1921	471	−0.4%
1930	540	+14.6%
1950	542	+0.4%
1961	599	+10.5%
1970	571	−4.7%
1980	596	+4.4%
1991	578	−3.0%
2001	584	+1.0%
2011	615	+5.3%
2021	625	+1.6%
Source: Censuses

== Notable people ==
- František Trávníček (1888–1961), Slavist and Bohemist
