= Slovo a slovesnost =

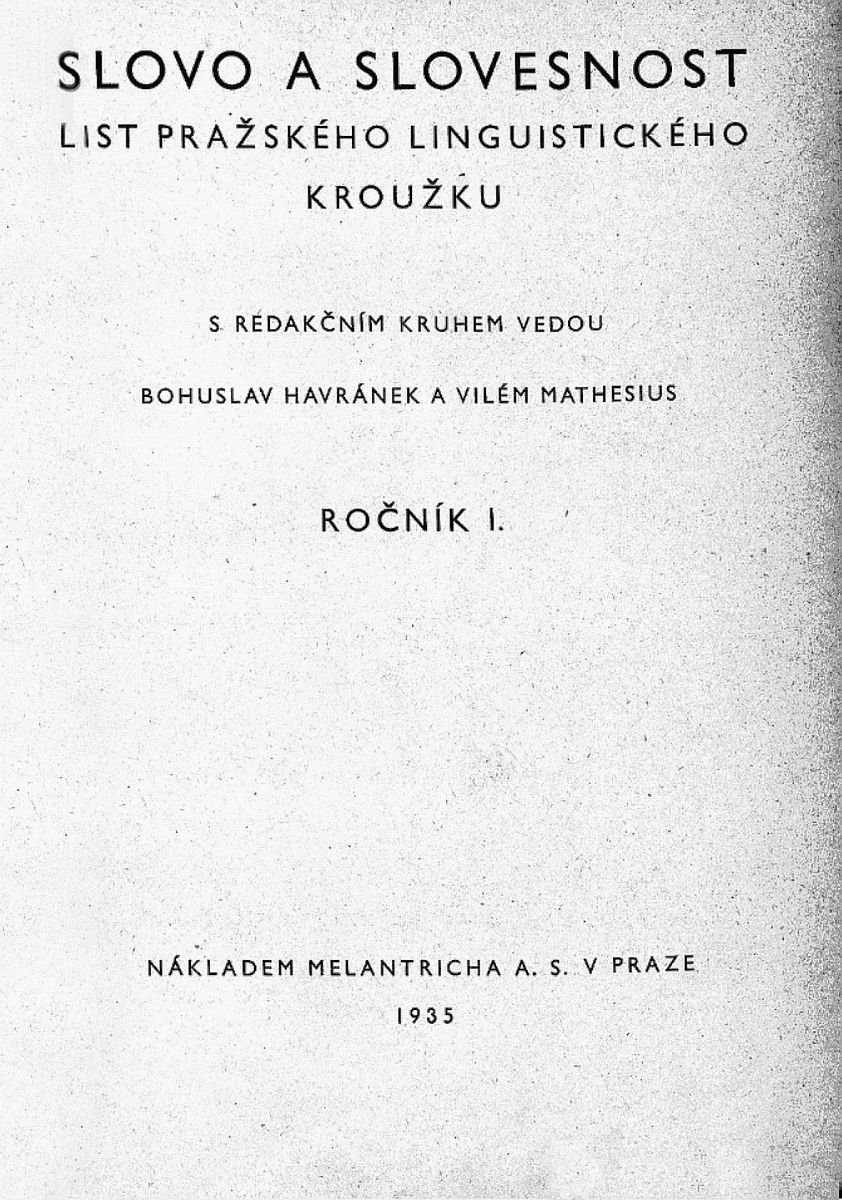
First issue of journal Slovo A Slovesnost

Slovo a slovesnost ("Word and word art"), is a Czech linguistic scholarly journal published four times a year by the Language Institute of the Czech Academy of Sciences. It was founded in 1935 by the Prague Linguistic Circle.

It is one of the most prestigious Czech-written journals that publishes articles from general linguistics and related fields. It deals with semiotics, semantics, grammar, pragmatics, sociolinguistics, psycholinguistics, text linguistics, and translation theory. The journal is published quarterly.

The magazine was founded in 1935 as an organ of the Prague Linguistic Circle.

The Editor-in-chief of the magazine is Petr Kaderka; the Executive Editor is Eva Havlová.

== See also ==
- List of Slavic studies journals
