= Jan Gebauer =

Czech linguist (1838–1907)

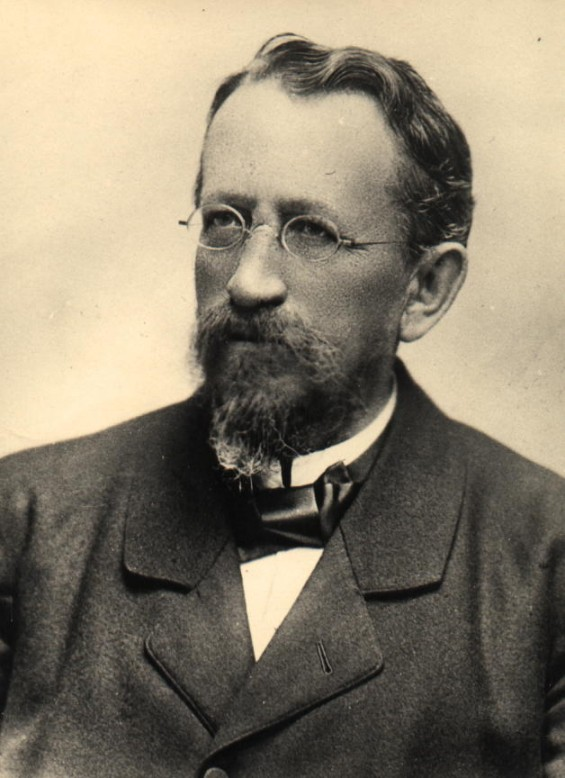
- Born: 8 October 1838; Úbislavice, Bohemia, Austrian Empire
- Died: 25 May 1907 (aged 68); Prague, Bohemia, Austria-Hungary
- Occupation: linguist

Academic work
- Notable works: Dictionary of the old Czech language

Jan Gebauer (8 October 1838 – 25 May 1907) was a Czech linguist. He was a significant expert on Czech studies. His scientific work was influenced by the methods of positivism.

== Biography ==
Jan Gebauer was born into a poor family in the small village of Úbislavice. Thanks to a recommendation from a local clergyman, Gebauer received an offer to study at high school in Jičín. After his school-leaving exam, he first went on to study theology, but he did not finish it and enrolled onto a philosophy program at Charles University instead. During the whole time of his studies, he suffered from a lack of money.

After finishing his studies, he started working as a teacher – in Prague at first, later in Pardubice, and finally in Prague again. He received his Ph.D. in 1872 and became a docent of the Czech language at the Charles University in 1873. In 1880 he was named professor extraordinarius and one year later professor ordinarius.

In 1886, he exposed the Manuscripts of Dvůr Králové and Zelená Hora ("discovered" in 1817) as literary hoaxes by Václav Hanka in Masaryk's Athenaeum journal.

Gebauer died on 25 May 1907 in Prague.

== Works ==
- Historická mluvnice jazyka českého (Historical grammar of the Czech language) – volumes Hláskosloví (Phonetics, 1894), Tvarosloví – Skloňování (Morphology – Declension, 1896), Tvarosloví – Časování (Morphology – Conjugation, 1898), Skladba (Syntax, 1929, edited and published by František Trávníček)
- Slovník staročeský (Dictionary of the old Czech language, 1903, 2 volumes, finished and published by Emil Smetánka)
- Mluvnice česká pro školy střední a ústavy učitelské I, II (Czech grammar for middle schools and pedagogical institutes I, II, 1890)
- Krátká mluvnice česká (Short Czech grammar, 1891)
