= Jaroslav Peregrin =

Czech philosopher (born 1957)

Jaroslav ("Jarda") Peregrin
- Born: 1957 (age 67–68)
- Era: 21st century
- Region: Western philosophy
- School: Analytic philosophy
- Main interests: Epistemology, logic, mind, mathematics, language

Jaroslav Peregrin (born 1957) is a professor of logic at Charles University in Prague and also a faculty member at the Academy of Sciences of the Czech Republic. He has published almost a hundred books and articles in several languages. Peregrin writes in Czech, English, German and Portuguese.

== English language publications ==
=== Monographs ===
Author

- Meaning and Structure (Aldershot: Ashgate, 2001)
- Doing Worlds with Words (Dordrecht: Kluwer, 1995)

Editor

- Meaning: the Dynamic Turn (Oxford: Elsevier, 2003)
- Truth and its Nature (Dordrecht: Kluwer, 1999)

== See also ==
- Prague Linguistic Circle
