= Jan Mukařovský =

Czech literary, linguistic and aesthetic theorist

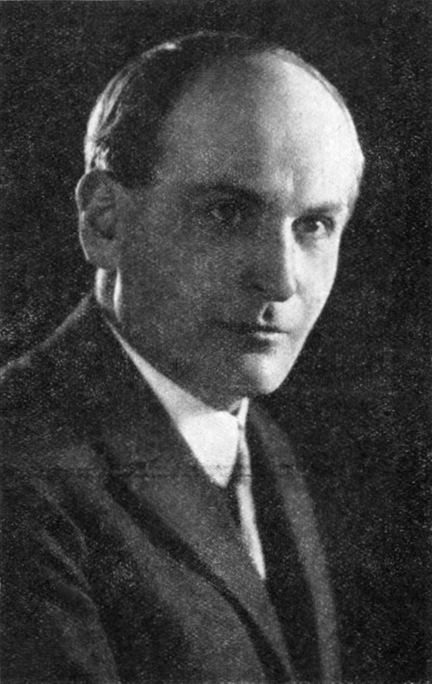
- Jan Mukařovský, c. 1932
- Born: 11 November 1891; Písek, Austria-Hungary
- Died: 8 February 1975 (aged 83); Prague, Czechoslovakia

Philosophical work
- School: Structuralism
- Main interests: Literary theory, aesthetics

Jan Mukařovský (Czech pronunciation: [ˈjan ˈmukar̝ofskiː]; 11 November 1891 – 8 February 1975) was a Czech literary, linguistic, and aesthetic theorist.

Mukařovský was professor at the Charles University of Prague. He is well known for his association with early structuralism as well as with the Prague Linguistic Circle, and for his development of the ideas of Russian formalism. Among other achievements, he applied ideas from Geneva linguist and semiotician Ferdinand de Saussure to the analysis of literary and artistic expression, systematically applying and extending the concept of linguistic function to literary works and their reception in different periods. Mukařovský had a profound influence on structuralist theory of literature, comparable to that of Roman Jakobson.

== Life and work ==
Mukařovský studied linguistics and aesthetics at the Charles University in Prague and graduated in 1915. In 1922 he received his doctoral degree. Until 1925, he taught in Plzeň, then at a grammar school in Prague. In 1926 he was among the founders of the Prague Linguistic Circle, along with his close friend Roman Jakobson. In 1929, Mukařovský received his habilitation with the Máchův Máj. Estetická studie, a work examining the romantic Czech poet Karel Hynek Mácha in the field of literary aesthetics.

In 1934, Mukařovský was appointed professor at the University of Bratislava in Slovakia. In 1938 he was appointed associate professor of aesthetics at the Charles University in Prague, which, however – like all other Czech universities – was closed by the occupying Nazis in November 1939. From 1941 to 1947 Mukařovský worked as an editor. After World War II, Mukařovský was favorable towards communism, and in 1948, the year of the communist coup d'état, Mukařovský became full professor at the reopened university in Prague. In the same year he was also elected Rector, a post he held until 1953. Due to increasing Stalinist pressure, Mukařovský recanted his prewar semiotic structuralism. In 1951 Mukařovský was appointed the director of the Institute for Czech Literature of the Czechoslovak Academy of Sciences, and remained in that position until 1962.

Mukařovský's significance is not limited to his membership in the Prague Linguistic Circle. His ideas extended beyond the realm of linguistics into the fields of poetics and aesthetics. However, reception of his theories in the West remains limited, due in part to linguistic barriers.

Mukařovský proposed to understand the literary work as a complex form. He distinguished four basic functions of language: the representative, expressive, appellative and the "aesthetic" function (Mukařovský 1938). Karl Bühler had introduced the first three functions in the "Theory of Language" (Bühler 1934) and Mukařovský added the fourth. Emphasis on the aesthetic is also reflected in his fundamental essays on the question: What is art? In "Art as Semiotic Fact," Mukařovský emphasized two characteristics of the artwork: The autonomic function and the communicative function.

Prior to World War II, Mukařovský, along with Jakobson, was close to members of the Czech avant-garde, interesting himself particularly in the Devětsil group and the Prague surrealist group.

== Works ==
- Dějiny české literatury (1959–1961), history of Czech literature, chief editor, three volumes
- Studien zur strukturalistischen Ästhetik und Poetik (1974)
- On Poetic Language (1976), translated by John Burbank and Peter Steiner
- The Word and Verbal Art: Selected Essays (1977), translated and edited by John Burbank and Peter Steiner
- Kapitel aus der Ästhetik (1978)
- Structure Sign and Function: Selected Essays (1978), translated and edited by John Burbank and Peter Steiner
- Aesthetic Function, Norm and Value as Social Facts (1970), Mark E. Suino translator
