= Nučice (Prague-East District) =

- Municipality
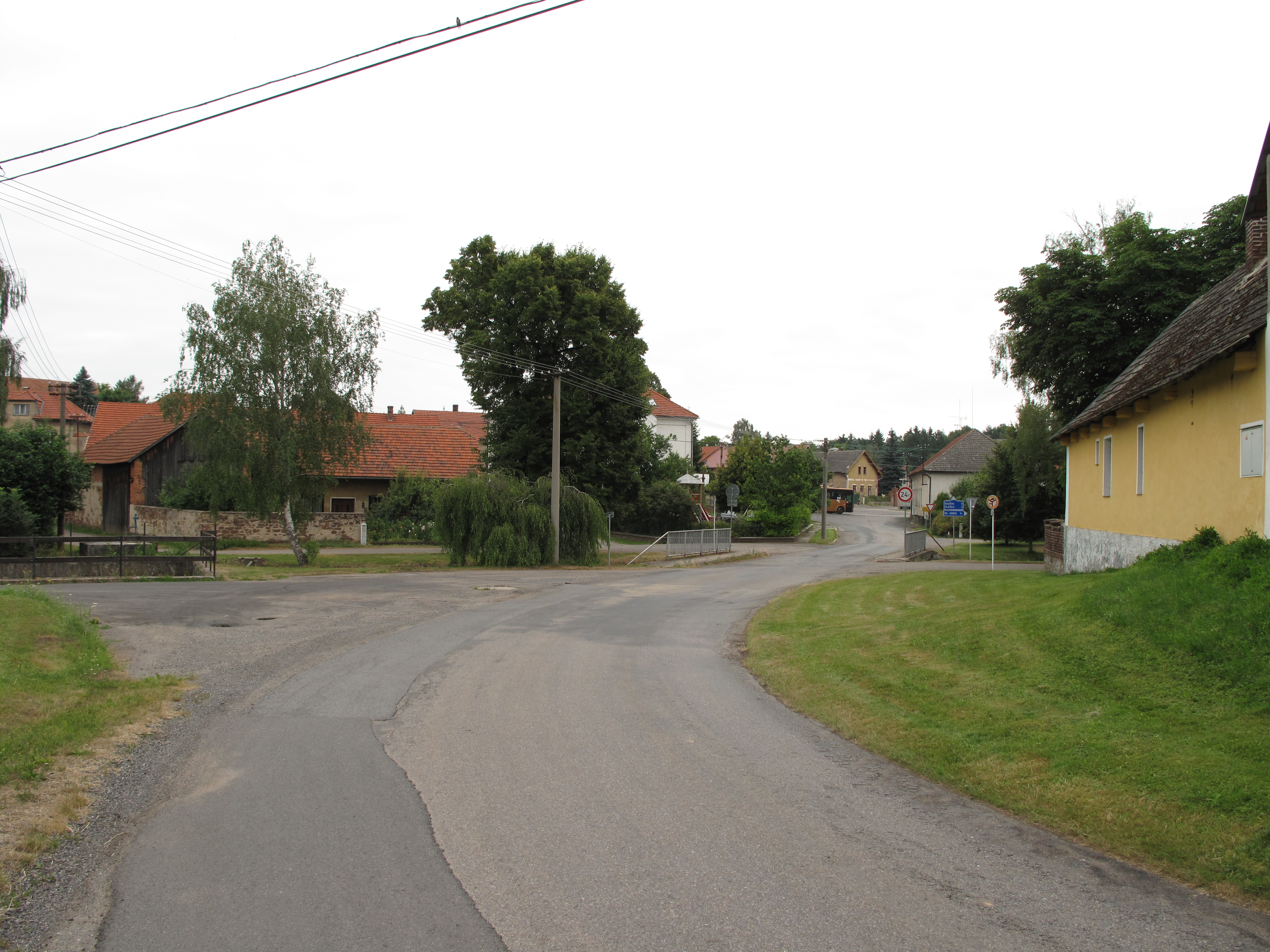
- Centre of Nučice

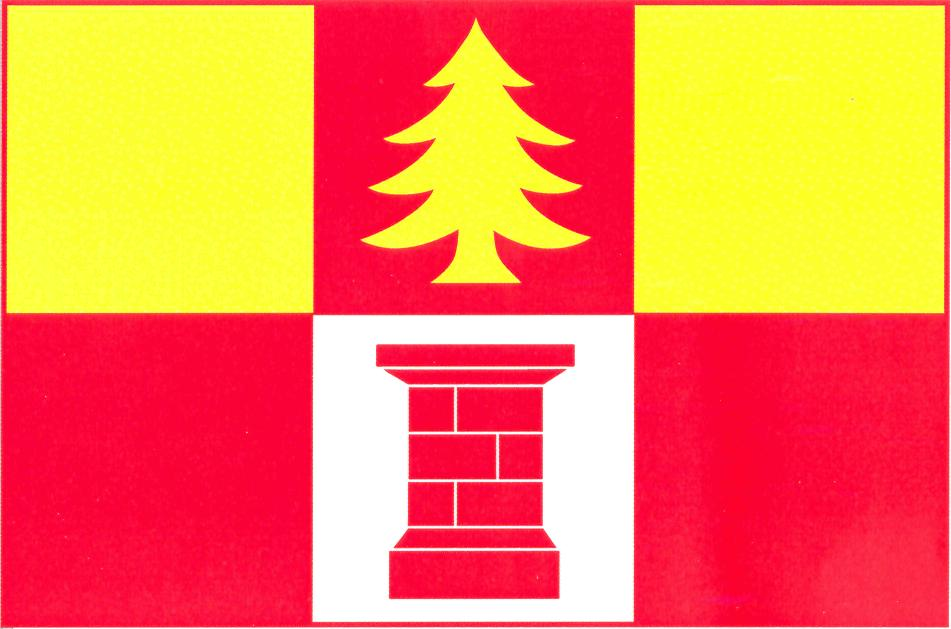
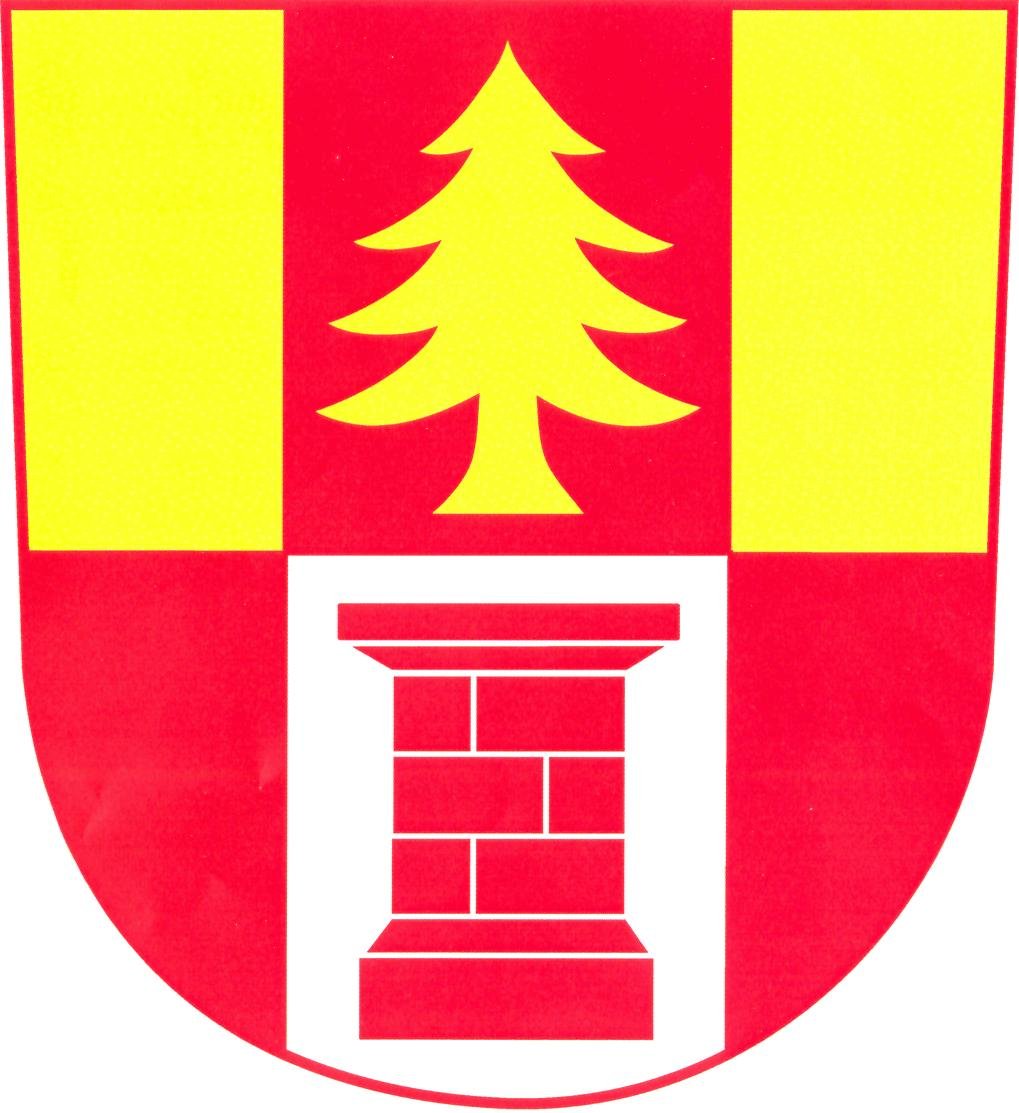
- Flag Coat of arms

- Location in the Czech Republic
- Coordinates: 49°57′20″N 14°53′4″E
- Country: Czech Republic
- Region: Central Bohemian
- District: Prague-East
- First mentioned: 1422

Area
  - Total: 4.98 km^{2} (1.92 sq mi)
- Elevation: 357 m (1,171 ft)

Population (2026-01-01)
  - Total: 392
  - Density: 78.7/km^{2} (204/sq mi)
- Time zone: UTC+1 (CET)
  - Summer (DST): UTC+2 (CEST)
- Postal code: 281 63
- Website: www.obec-nucice.cz

Nučice is a municipality and village in Prague-East District in the Central Bohemian Region of the Czech Republic. It has about 400 inhabitants.

== History ==
The first written mention of Nučice is from 1422.

== Demographics ==
Historical population
Year	Pop.	±%
1869	453	—
1880	460	+1.5%
1890	488	+6.1%
1900	483	−1.0%
1910	439	−9.1%
1921	415	−5.5%
1930	380	−8.4%
1950	287	−24.5%
1961	296	+3.1%
1970	247	−16.6%
1980	269	+8.9%
1991	317	+17.8%
2001	337	+6.3%
2011	344	+2.1%
2021	360	+4.7%
Source: Censuses
