= Prague linguistic circle =

Language and literature society

The Prague school or Prague linguistic circle is a language and literature society. It started in 1926 as a group of linguists, philologists and literary critics in Prague. Its proponents developed methods of structuralist literary analysis and a theory of the standard language and of language cultivation from 1928 to 1939. The linguistic circle was founded in the Café Derby in Prague, which is also where meetings took place during its first years.

The Prague School has had a significant continuing influence on linguistics and semiotics. After the Czechoslovak coup d'état of 1948, the circle was disbanded in 1952, but the Prague School continued as a major force in linguistic functionalism (distinct from the Copenhagen school or English Firthian – later Hallidean – linguistics). The American scholar Dell Hymes cites his 1962 paper "The Ethnography of Speaking" as the formal introduction of Prague functionalism to American linguistic anthropology. The Prague structuralists also had a significant influence on structuralist film theory, especially through the introduction of the ostensive sign.

Today the Prague linguistic circle is a scholarly society which aims to contribute to the knowledge of language and related sign systems according to functionally structural principles. To this end, it organizes regular meetings with lectures and debates, publishes professional publications, and organizes international meetings.

== History ==
The Prague linguistic circle included the Russian émigrés Roman Jakobson, Nikolai Trubetzkoy, and Sergei Karcevskiy, as well as the famous Czech literary scholars René Wellek and Jan Mukařovský. The instigator of the circle, and its first president until his death in 1945, was the Czech linguist Vilém Mathesius.

In 1929 the Circle promulgated its theses in a paper submitted to the First Congress of Slavists. "The programmatic 1929 Prague Theses, surely one of the most imposing linguistic edifices of the 20th century, incapsulated [sic] the functionalist credo." In the late 20th century, English translations of the Circle's seminal works were published by the Czech linguist Josef Vachek in several collections.

Also in 1929, the group launched a journal, Travaux du Cercle Linguistique de Prague. World War II brought an end to it. The Travaux was briefly resurrected in 1966–1971. The inaugural issue was devoted to the political science concept of center and periphery. It was resurrected yet again in 1995. The group's Czech language work is published in Slovo a slovesnost (Word and Literature).

== Members ==
Proper members
- Petr Bogatyrev
- František Čermák
- Miroslav Červenka
- Bohuslav Havránek
- Tomáš Hoskovec
- Josef Hrabák
- Roman Jakobson
- Sergei Kartsevski
- Oldřich Leška
- Alena Macurová
- Vilém Mathesius
- Jan Mukařovský
- Karel Oliva
- Vladimír Skalička
- Bohumil Trnka
- Pavel Trost
- Nikolai Trubetzkoy
- Josef Vachek
- Jiří Veltruský
- Miloš Weingart
- René Wellek
- Ludwig Winder

Contributors

- Aleksandar Belić, president of the Serbian Academy of Sciences and Arts
- Émile Benveniste
- Karl Bühler
- Albert Willem de Groot
- Daniel Jones
- André Martinet
- Ladislav Matějka
- Lucien Tesnière
- Valentin Voloshinov

Influences

- Jan Baudouin de Courtenay
- Filipp Fortunatov, the founder of the Moscow linguistic circle
- Anton Marty
- Ferdinand de Saussure

Influenced

- Noam Chomsky
- Joseph Greenberg
- Jiří Levý
- Dell Hymes
- Alf Sommerfelt
- Jože Toporišič
- Michael Halliday
- Viktor Shklovsky
- Emilio Alarcos Llorach
- Michael Silverstein
- Jan Firbas
- Lubomír Doležel
- Austin Warren
- Jan Baudouin de Courtenay
- Louis Hjelmslev
- Jaroslav Vacek
- Jaroslav Peregrin
- Miroslav Komárek
- Tartu–Moscow Semiotic School

== See also ==
- Czech studies
- Functional generative description
- Markedness
- Moscow linguistic circle
- OPOJAZ
- Russian formalism
- Topic and comment

== Bibliography ==
- Luelsdorf, Philip A. (1983). On Praguian functionalism and some extensions. In Josef Vachek, Libuše Dušková, (eds.). Praguiana: Some Basic and Less Known Aspects of The Prague Linguistic School. John Benjamins. Linguistic and literary studies in Eastern Europe; 12. pp. xi-xxx.
- Sériot, Patrick (2014). Structure and the Whole: East, West and Non-Darwinian Biology in the Origins of Structural Linguistics. (Semiotics, Communication and Cognition 12.) Berlin: De Gruyter Mouton.
- Toman, Jindřich (1995). The Magic of a Common Language: Jakobson, Mathesius, Trubetzkoy, and the Prague Linguistic Circle. Cambridge, Massachusetts: The MIT Press. ISBN 0-262-20096-1
