= Bohuslav Havránek =

Czech academic (1893–1978)

Professor Bohuslav Havránek
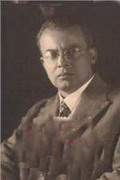
- Born: 30 January 1893; Prague, Bohemia, Austria-Hungary
- Died: 2 March 1978 (aged 85); Prague, Czechoslovakia
- Burial place: Olšany Cemetery
- Awards: Order of the Republic; Order of Saints Cyril and Methodius

Academic background
- Education: Faculty of Arts, Charles University

Academic work
- School or tradition: Prague linguistic circle Structuralism
- Institutions: Charles University; Masaryk University; Czechoslovak Academy of Sciences
- Main interests: Slavonics and Czech studies

Bohuslav Havránek (30 January 1893 – 2 March 1978) was a Czech philologist, Bohemist, Slavist and literary historian. He worked as a university professor and was a prominent member of the Prague linguistic circle.

== Life and career ==
He was born in to the family of a teacher. After his graduation, he worked as a secondary school teacher, before completing his studies in 1928, with his work 'The Genera Verbi in the Slavic languages' ('Genera verbi v slovanských jazycích' in Czech).

From 1917 to 1929, he worked as a high school professor at grammar schools in Prague (in Truhlářská and Dušní streets). He also worked in at the Czech Academy of Sciences and Arts. In 1926, Havránek helped found the Prague linguistic circle and was soon, alongside Vilém Mathesius, one of Czech linguistics' most important representatives and in the following years he was a co-creator of its linguistic theory and methodology. In 1935, he founded the linguistic journal Slovo a slovesnost.

In 1930, he became a professor at Masaryk University in Brno, and taught there until the closing of Czech universities by the German occupation of 1939. During his time in Brno, he became close to the representatives of the Left Front. In the 1930s, he became chairman of the Society for Relations with the Soviet Union in Brno and remained so until its dissolution in 1939. Together with other left-leaning intellectuals, he signed the We Will Remain, Manifesto in 1938 to mobilize Czech society against Nazi aggression. In 1945, at the suggestion of the Communist Party, he became a member of the Revolutionary Central National Committee in Brno as a non-partisan. He later joined the Communist Party, where he held a number of positions, including as a member of the National Front's action committees. In 1948, he signed a manifesto supporting the February coup and the Communist seizure of power.

Beginning in 1945, he was professor at the Charles University in Prague, later becoming head of the Department for the Czech Language, then Phonetics, then General Linguistics, and finally Dean of the Faculty of Arts. From 1953 to 1961, he was also rector of the Academy of Russian Language and Literature.

In 1952, he became academician and first director of the Institute for Czech Language, and of the Czechoslovak Academy of Sciences, remaining so until 1965.

Havránek was a leading proponent of European structuralism, but also worked in sociolinguistics and linguistic history. His contribution to the theory of the standard languages is today recognized as especially important.
