= Pavel Materna =

Czech philosopher, logician (1930–2024)

- Born: 21 April 1930; Hněvkovice, Czech Republic
- Died: 25 October 2024 (aged 94); Prague, Czech Republic

Education
- Education: Charles University
- Thesis: Zu einigen Fragen der modernen Definitionslehre (1957)
- Doctoral advisor: Otakar Zich

Philosophical work
- Era: Contemporary philosophy
- Region: Western philosophy
- School: Analytic
- Main interests: Transparent intensional logic, semantics of natural languages, logical analysis of natural languages, pragmatics

Pavel Materna (21 April 1930 – 25 October 2024) was a Czech philosopher, logician and key representative of transparent intensional logic.

== Education and work ==
Materna was introduced to philosophy and logic by his father, Miloš Materna (9 April 1892 – 4 August 1951), a member of a group of interwar and postwar Czech logicians propagating and popularizing neopositivism in Czechoslovakia. In 1949, he enrolled at the Faculty of Arts of Charles University to study philosophy and psychology. He graduated in 1953, and in 1957 he completed his postgraduate studies by defending a dissertation called Zu einigen Fragen der modernen Definitionslehre, published in 1959.

In 1965, he became an Assistant Professor and a year later an Associate Professor (Docent) at Masaryk University, which he was forced to leave in 1976 due to a number of oppressive restrictions imposed on him by the communist authorities. He could return to teach and carry out research at the university only after the fall of the communist regime in Czechoslovakia. In 1991, he was promoted to the rank of Full Professor of Masaryk University.

Pavel Materna's most significant contributions to logic were in the fields of semantics and logical analysis of natural languages. A close friend of the logician Pavel Tichý, he was a keen follower and developer of Tichý's transparent intensional logic (TIL):

"... Based on the procedural semantics of TIL, I developed a new and original theory of concepts, where concept is a closed TIL construction. This is a realistic, anti-contextualist and compositional remarkable adjustment of Frege's notion of concept. My theory of concepts is thus closer to Bolzano's significant ideas, and in many aspects also to Church's conception."

Materna's scholarly activities always extended beyond teaching, research and editorial work, and also include many translations (works by Church, Grzegorczyk, Kotarbiński, Schaff, Tarski) and numerous textbooks for university students and general public.

== Honors and awards ==
- 2016 Emeritus Scholar, Czech Academy of Sciences
- 2011 Prize of the Council of the Czech Academy of Sciences
- 2010 Gold Medal, Masaryk University
- 2003 Professor Emeritus, Masaryk University
- Childers, Timothy & Jari Palomäki (eds) (2000) Between Words and Worlds. A Festschrift for Pavel Materna. Prague: Filosofia. ISBN 8070071400.
- Invited lecturer at University of Colorado Boulder, University of Otago, University of Konstanz, University of Tübingen, Leiden University, University of Warsaw, University of Kraków, University of Helsinki, and other universities.

== Selected bibliography ==
1. Materna, Pavel (2014) "Is Transparent Intensional Logic a non-classical logic?". Logic and Logical Philosophy 23 (1): 47–55. ISSN 2300-9802.
2. Duží, Marie, Bjørn Jespersen & Pavel Materna (2010) Procedural Semantics for Hyperintensional Logic – Foundations and Applications of Transparent Intensional Logic. Dordrecht: Springer. ISBN 9789048188116.
3. Materna, Pavel (2010) "Denotation and Reference". Organon F 17 (1): 3–20. ISSN 1335-0668.
4. Materna, Pavel (2009) "Concepts and Recipes". Acta Analytica 24 (1): 69–90. ISSN 0353-5150.
5. Materna, Pavel (2004) "Are Concepts a priori?". ProFil 5 (2): 1–14. ISSN 1212-9097.
6. Materna, Pavel (2004) Conceptual Systems. Berlin: Logos Verlag. ISBN 3832506365.
7. Materna, Pavel (1998) Concepts and Objects. Helsinki: The Philosophical Society of Finland. ISBN 9519264345.
8. Materna, Pavel & Petr Kolář (1993) "On the Nature of Facts" IN Philosophie und Logik. Perspectives in Analytical Philosophy. Berlin: Walter De Gruyter, 77–96. ISBN 3110140691.
9. Materna, Pavel, Eva Hajičová & Petr Sgall (1987) "Redundant answers and topic-focus articulation". Linguistics and Philosophy 10 (1): 101–113. ISSN 0165-0157.
10. Svoboda, Aleš & Pavel Materna (1987) "Functional sentence perspective and intensional logic" IN Functionalism in Linguistics. Amsterdam: John Benjamins, 191–205. ISBN 9789027282484.
11. Materna, Pavel (1985) "“Linguistic constructions” in the transparent intensional logic". Prague Bulletin of Mathematical Linguistics 43: 5–24. ISSN 0032-6585.
12. Svoboda, Aleš, Pavel Materna & Karel Pala (1979) "The ordered-triple theory continued". Brno Studies in English 13: 119–165. ISSN 0524-6881.
13. Svoboda, Aleš, Pavel Materna & Karel Pala (1976) "An ordered-triple theory of language". Brno Studies in English 12: 159–186. ISSN 0524-6881.

== Sources ==
- Gabriel, Jiří (2015) "Brněnská léta Pavla Materny" [The Brno years of Professor Pavel Materna]. Studia philosophica 62 (2): 67–73. ISSN 2336-453X.
