= Olga T. Yokoyama =

Olga Tsuneko Yokoyama
- Born: September 11, 1942 (age 83); China
- Other names: Ольга Борисовна
- Citizenship: USA
- Occupation: Linguist
- Notable work: Discourse and word order Russian Peasant Letters: Texts and Contexts
- Website: http://www.appling.ucla.edu/people/faculty/2-uncategorised/112-test-akash

Olga Tsuneko Yokoyama (Russian Ольга Борисовна Йокояма, born September 11, 1942) is a Distinguished Professor of Applied Linguistics at the University of California in Los Angeles (UCLA). Her research interests include topics in Slavic philology, functionalist constraints in the syntax, word order and intonation of Russian.

== Life and career ==
In 1970 Yokoyama received her D.D.S. (Doctor of Dental Science) degree from Tokyo Medical and Dental University. Then she received two M.A. degrees in Slavic linguistics and literature: in 1972 from the University of Illinois and in 1974 from Harvard University where she was one of the students of Roman Jakobson and Susumu Kuno and stayed there to complete her Ph.D. in Slavic Linguistics in 1979.

Yokoyama then stayed at her alma mater, Harvard University, to start her career as assistant professor, receiving tenure in 1987. In 1995 she moved to California, where she started as professor of Slavic languages and literature at UCLA, moving to Applied Linguistics in 2004. In 2012, she was awarded the title of distinguished professor.

Yokoyama's research has been supported by the National Science Foundation, the National Endowment for the Humanities, the DAAD-ACLS German-American Commission, and the Modern Humanities Research Association, among others. She has been invited as a visiting scholar to universities in the U.S., Russia, Korea and Japan. Yokoyama received a high recognition from the Russian government as she was awarded a title honorary doctorate by Russian Federation Ministry of Education and Science in 2013.

== Research ==
=== Discourse and Word Order ===
Yokoyama's book Discourse and Word Order (1986) consists of two parts. In Part 1, Yokoyama proposes a universal cognitive Transactional Discourse Model (TDM) to account for primarily information discourse-initial utterances (directives, statements, effusions/exclamatory sentences, questions) and non-discourse-initial utterances (obligatory responses, voluntary contributions). In Part 2 she demonstrates how this model applies to Russian word order and intonation patterns. She also reviews the studies on Topic and comment by the Prague School: the works of V. Mathesius, F. Daneš, P. Sgall, E. Hajicova, J. Firbas, and P. Adamec without mentioning the earlier sources such as G. v.d. Gabelentz, H. Paul, and W. Wundt.

TDM represents verbal communication process between two people, in terms of transaction of seven kinds of knowledge, which Yokoyama graphically displays by using a Venn diagram.

Two kinds of metinformational knowledge:

- Knowledge of the code (lexicon and grammar of the language)
- Knowledge of the discourse situation (assessment of the knowledge set of the conversation partner B)

Five kinds of informational knowledge:

- Referential knowledge – the ability to connect linguistic representation to term. The sentence “I spoke to Jane Smith” is evidence for the fact that A has referential knowledge of Jane Smith.
- Propositional knowledge – knowledge that some event happened.
- Specificational knowledge – enables the speaker to replace an unspecified term with a specified term.
- Existential knowledge – the assumption that that person or place does exist; however there is no specificational knowledge of this person or a place.
- Predicational knowledge – presupposed by the question “What happened?” and connected to propositional knowledge “Something happened”. It implies predicative and existential knowledge of the terms.

In addition, Yokoyama proposes four minimal units of the discourse model: the set of knowledge of the speaker (A); the set of knowledge of the addressee (B); the area of present concern of the speaker (Ca); and the area of present concern of the addressee (Cb). These units undergo changes during the communication process as the transaction of seven kinds of knowledge occurs.

TDM presupposes conditions for successful communication: the area of present concern of the speaker and the area of the present concern of the addressee should intersect (Ca∩Cb), i.e. the intersection is not empty, not a null-set. However, it is possible that Ca contains the information that is not within B’s current concern Cb, therefore the imposition of A’s concern will take place, due to the wrong assessment of the discourse situation. Imposition may be seen as a dominating or even aggressive behaviour. Thus TDM explains why people try to minimize imposition on people they don’t know at all, or don’t know well enough.

Yokoyama’s analysis is unique in its empirical and well-constructed support to the formal representation of multiple interrelated factors: the knowledge sets of the interlocutors and matters of their current concerns. By examining those minimal units of informal discourse situations, Yokoyama makes it possible to formulate rules governing the intentional transaction of knowledge between conversation partners and apply them to specific examples of modern Russian language.

== Publications ==
Over the years of her career Yokoyama has published articles in various journals in the U.S. and internationally and presented at conferences in US, Asia and Europe. The topics cover discourse grammar, gender linguistics, Russian intonation, and analysis of literary language, and the language of the 19th century Russian peasants' correspondence.

=== Russian Peasant Letters ===
Vjatka region marked red

Yokoyama's book Russian Peasant Letters include a collection of letters exchanged between members of the Stafanovs/Zhernakovs family, which represent an invaluable primary source for studying dialectal speech typical of the Vyatka region in the second half of the 19th century.

Most of the letters were addressed to Yokoyama's grandfather Vasiliy Zhernakov, who in 1881, at the age of 17, left home in the former Vyatka Province for Siberia to earn money and eventually became a successful merchant and philanthropist. Yokoyama recognized that this is a valuable source for studying the language and economic conditions of common people in Russia in the late 19th century.

The first volume contains original facsimiles of the letters with comments on phonological and orthographic variations; and their translation into modern Russian with comments on grammar and meaning of some words. The second volume provides the English translation of these letters with practical cultural comments, explaining different farming terms or relationships within the family.

Yokoyama's study is important both linguistically, presenting the original north-eastern dialectal speech of peasants in the 19th century, and historically, showing the real struggles of peasants striving for upward mobility in pre-revolutionary Russia. Yokoyama conducted a thorough linguistic analysis of the language of the letters, covering such aspects as phonology, word change, word order, syntax, discourse, pragmatics, poetic aspects and variations . However, historiographers may find the historical part of research incomplete, but still a valuable source for research on life of Russian peasants in the 19th century.

=== Books authored ===
- 1980 Studies in Russian Functional Syntax (Harvard Studies in Syntax and Semantics III, Part II). Harvard University Linguistics Department: Cambridge, MA. 328 pp.
- 1986 Discourse and Word Order. Benjamins: Amsterdam-Philadelphia. 361 pp.
- 2008 Russian Peasant Letters: Texts and Contexts. 2 vols. Verlag Otto Harrassowitz: . 983 pp.

=== Books edited ===
- 1990 Harvard Studies in Slavic Linguistics, vol. 1. Slavic Linguistics Colloquium: . 360 pp.
- 1993 Harvard Studies in Slavic Linguistics, vol. 2. Slavic Linguistics Colloquium: . 265 pp.
- 1995 Harvard Studies in Slavic Linguistics, vol. 3. Slavic Linguistics Colloquium: . 242 pp.

=== Articles ===
- 1981 “On sentence-coordination in Russian: a functional approach” in Papers from the Seventeenth Regional Meeting. Linguistic Society, Chicago, 431-439.
- 1983 “V zaščitu zapretnyx deepričastij (The case for dangling participles)”, in M.S. Flier (ed.), American Contributions to the Ninth International Congress of Slavists, vol. I, Linguistics. Slavica, Columbus, OH, 373-381.
- 1986a “Lexical frequency and its implications: the case of Contemporary Edited Russian”. Slavic and East European Journal 30.2, 147-166.
- 1988a “Disbelief, lies, and manipulations in a Transactional Discourse Model”, in H. Parret (ed.), Rhetoric of Lying (Argumentation 2.1), 131-149.
- 1991b “Shifters and non-verbal categories of Russian”, in L.R. Waugh & S. Rudy (eds.), New Vistas in Grammar: Invariance and Variation (Current Issues in Linguistic Theory 49). Benjamins, Amsterdam-Philadelphia, 363-386.
- 1999b “Russian genderlects and referential expressions”, Language in Society 28, 401-429.
- 2000b “Èmpatija v ramkax transakcionnoj modeli diskursa (Empathy in the Transactional Discourse Model)”, in L.P. Krysin (ed.). Russkij jazyk segodnja, Azbukovnik, 276-286.
- 2001 “Neutral and Non-Neutral Intonation in Russian: A Reinterpretation of the IK System”. Die Welt der Slaven XLVI.1, 1-26.
- 2002b “Markirovannost’ t.n. nejtral’noj intonacii: po dannym detskoj reči (The markedness of so-called neutral intonation: evidence from child language).” Problemy fonetiki IV, 148-157.
- 2003b “Speech genre differences in the fundamental frequency of Russian men and women”, in J. van Leeuwen-Turnovcová & U. Röhrborn (eds.), Beiträge des Gender-Blocks zum XIII. Internationalen Slavistenkongress in Verlag Otto Sagner, München, 7-28.
- 2003e “Intonacija kak sredstvo xarakteristiki kommunikativnogo modusa povestvovanija v zoščenkovskom tekste (Intonation as means of characterization in the narrative communicative mode in texts by Zoščenko)”. Russkij jazyk v naučnom osveščenii 2003.6, 127-143.
- 2006a “Word order in spoken discourse”, in K. Brown (ed.), Encyclopaedia of Language and Linguistics, 2nd ed., vol. 12. Elsevier Science, Oxford, 88-95.
- 2011b “Gender v pis’max krest’jan 19-go veka (Gender in 19th century peasant letters)”, in Regina Nohejl, Friderike Karl, & Elisabeth Cheauré (eds.), Konstrukty nacional'noj identičnosti v russkoj kul’ture: vtoraja polovina XIX stoletija - Serebrjanyj vek. RGGU Univ. Press, Moscow, 141-152.
- 2013 “Sentential Stress in written texts: evidence from literary and dialectal Russian”. Phonological Studies 16, 109-115.
- 2014b “The use of the ‘polite vy’ in Russian: a pragmatic change in progress”, in M.S. Flier, D.J. Birnbaum, & C.M. Vakareliyska (eds.), Philology Broad and Deep: In Memoriam Horace G. Lunt. Slavica, Bloomington IN, 341-361.
