= Yokoyama =

Yokoyama (written: 横山) is a Japanese surname. Notable people with the surname include:

- Akihito Yokoyama (born 1961), Japanese golfer
- Ayumu Yokoyama (born 2003), Japanese footballer
- Chisa Yokoyama (born 1969), Japanese voice actress and singer
- Go Yokoyama in fact Tsuyoshi Yokoyama (b. 1983), Japanese kickboxer
- Hideo Yokoyama (born 1957), Japanese novelist
- Hiroaki Yokoyama (横山 泰明; born 1980), Japanese shogi player
- Hiroki Yokoyama (disambiguation), multiple people
- Hirotoshi Yokoyama (born 1975), Japanese football player
- Hokuto Yokoyama (born 1963), Japanese Democratic Party politician
- Isamu Yokoyama (1889–1952), general in the Imperial Japanese Army
- Juri Yokoyama (born 1955), Japanese volleyball player
- Katsuya Yokoyama (1934–2010), renowned player and teacher of the shakuhachi, a traditional Japanese vertical bamboo flute
- Ken Yokoyama (disambiguation), multiple people
- Kenzo Yokoyama (born 1943), Japanese football player and coach
- Knock Yokoyama (1932–2007), Japanese comedian and politician
- Kumi Yokoyama (born 1993), Japanese football striker
- Kumiko Yokoyama (横山 久美子; born 1972), Japanese cross-country skier
- Kunihiko Yokoyama (横山 邦彦; born 1947), Japanese basketball player
- Marumitsu Yokoyama in fact Okitaka Yokoyama (1780–1854), Japanese late Edo period samurai and founder of the Tōkyūjutsu
- Manabu Yokoyama (横山 学; born 1974), Japanese pole vaulter
- Masafumi Yokoyama (born 1956), Japanese football player
- Masami Yokoyama (born 1981), Japanese volleyball player
- Matsuo Yokoyama (born 1927), president of Walt Disney Enterprises of Japan
- Matsusaburō Yokoyama (1838–1884), pioneering Japanese photographer, artist, lithographer and teacher
- Megumi Yokoyama (actress) (横山 めぐみ; born 1969), Japanese actress
- Megumi Yokoyama (badminton) (横山 めぐみ; born 1990), Japanese badminton player
- Minehiro Yokoyama (born 1971), Japanese ski mountaineer
- Mitsuteru Yokoyama (1934–2004), Japanese manga artist
- Naoki Yokoyama (born 1949), Japanese electrical engineer
- Olga T. Yokoyama (born 1942), American linguist
- Reina Yokoyama (born 2001), Japanese idol and member of girl-group Morning Musume
- Sakujirō Yokoyama (1864–1912), early disciple of Kanō Jigorō
- Satoshi Yokoyama (born 1980), Japanese footballer
- Seiji Yokoyama (1935–2017), Japanese incidental music composer
- Shizuo Yokoyama (1890–1961), Japanese general in the Imperial Japanese Army
- Shōmatsu Yokoyama (1913–1992), Japanese physician
- Sodō Yokoyama (1907–1980), Japanese Zen priest
- Sumie Ishitaka (née Sumie Yokoyama), women's professional shogi player
- Sumiko Yokoyama (born 1974), Japanese cross-country skier
- Taikan Yokoyama, pseudonym of Sakai Hidemaro (1868–1958), major figure in pre-WW2 Japanese painting
- Takashi Yokoyama (swimmer) (横山 隆志; 1913–1945), Japanese swimmer
- Takashi Yokoyama (water polo) (横山 隆; born 1940), Japanese water polo player
- Takayuki Yokoyama (born 1972), Japanese football player
- Takuji Yokoyama (横山 卓司; born 1990), Japanese footballer
- Takuya Yokoyama (born 1985), Japanese footballer
- Tomonobu Yokoyama (born 1985), Japanese footballer
- You Yokoyama (born 1981), Japanese idol, singer, actor, radio host and lyricist, member of band Kanjani 8
- Yui Yokoyama (born 1992), Japanese idol, member of girl-group AKB48
- Yuji Yokoyama (born 1969), Japanese footballer

== See also ==
- Yokoyama Dam, a dam in Ibigawa, in the Gifu Prefecture of Japan
- Yokoyama Station (disambiguation), multiple Japanese railway stations
