= Communicative dynamism =

In linguistics, Communicative Dynamism (CD) is one of the key notions of the theory of Functional Sentence Perspective (FSP), developed mainly by Jan Firbas and his followers in the Prague School of Linguistics.

CD is canonically described as "a phenomenon constantly displayed by linguistic elements in the act of communication. It is an inherent quality of communication and manifests itself in constant development towards the attainment of a communicative goal; in other words, towards the fulfilment of a communicative purpose."

Extensive research in FSP has established that Communicative Dynamism is a matter of degree:

"Entering into the flow of communication, the meaning conveyed by a linguistic element acquires the character of information and participates in the development of the communication and in the fulfilment of the communicative purpose. If unhampered by other factors, linear modification produces the following effect. The closer to the end of the sentence an element comes to stand, the greater the extent to which it contributes towards the development and completion of the communication. Whereas the element occurring finally contributes most to this development, the element occurring initially contributes least to it. Elements occurring neither at the beginning nor at the end rank between the two. In this way, the element occurring finally proves to be the most dynamic element within the sentence, for it completes the development of the communication; it is the element towards which the communication is perspectived. The element occurring initially is the least dynamic. The other elements rank between them. In regard to the dynamics of the communication, all elements display different degrees of communicative dynamism (CD)."

The notion of Communicative Dynamism was introduced into linguistics by Jan Firbas in 1956 in a study called Poznámky k problematice anglického slovního pořádku s hlediska aktuálního členění větného [Some notes on the problem of English word order from the point of view of functional sentence perspective]. Today, the term is firmly established in major academic grammars, as well as in general reference works on language and linguistics:

- "Communicative dynamism refers to the variation of communicative value as between different parts of an utterance."
- "communicative dynamism: variation in the importance or prominence of different parts of an utterance in conveying communication."

== See also ==
- Topic and comment
- Functional linguistics

== Further resources ==
- Libuše Dušková, "Basic distribution of communicative dynamism vs. nonlinear indication of functional sentence perspective" IN Eva Hajičová, Tomáš Hoskovec, Oldřich Leška, Petr Sgall and Zdena Skoumalová (eds): Prague Linguistic Circle Papers - Travaux du cercle linguistique de Prague nouvelle série (3), Amsterdam: John Benjamins, 1999, pp. 249–261. https://doi.org/10.1075/plcp.3
- Libuše Dušková, "Deviations from the basic distribution of communicative dynamism as a style marker", Brno Studies in English 41(1), 2015, pp. 29–40. https://digilib.phil.muni.cz/bitstream/handle/11222.digilib/134762/1_BrnoStudiesEnglish_41-2015-1_4.pdf
- Jan Firbas, "On the concept of communicative dynamism in the theory of functional sentence perspective’, Sborník prací Filozofické fakulty brněnské univerzity A19, 1971, pp. 135–144. https://digilib.phil.muni.cz/bitstream/handle/11222.digilib/100731/A_Linguistica_19-1971-1_14.pdf
- Jan Firbas, "Die Träger des kommunikativen Dynamismus" [Carriers of communicative dynamism] IN Günter Weise (ed.): Kommunikativ-funktionale Sprachbetrachtung 1, Halle an der Saale: Martin-Luther-Universität, 1981, pp. 80–86.
- Jan Firbas, "On the operation of communicative dynamism in functional sentence perspective", Leuvense Bijdragen 76, 1987, pp. 289–304.
- Jan Firbas, Functional Sentence Perspective in Written and Spoken Communication, Cambridge: Cambridge University Press, 1992. https://doi.org/10.1017/CBO9780511597817
- Jan Firbas, "Communicative Dynamism" IN Handbook of Pragmatics, Amsterdam/Philadelphia: John Benjamins, 1999. https://doi.org/10.1075/hop.5.comm4
- Aleš Svoboda, Kapitoly z funkční syntaxe [Chapters from functional syntax], Prague: Státní pedagogické nakladatelství, 1989.
- Ludmila Uhlířová and Aleš Svoboda, "DISTRIBUČNÍ POLE" [Distributional field] IN Petr Karlík, Marek Nekula and Jana Pleskalová (eds): CzechEncy - Nový encyklopedický slovník češtiny, online, 2017. https://www.czechency.org/slovnik/DISTRIBU%C4%8CN%C3%8D%20POLE (accessed: 25 March 2021)
- Ludmila Uhlířová and Aleš Svoboda, "STUPNICE VÝPOVĚDNÍ DYNAMIČNOSTI" [Scale of communicative dynamism] IN Petr Karlík, Marek Nekula and Jana Pleskalová (eds): CzechEncy - Nový encyklopedický slovník češtiny, online, 2017. https://www.czechency.org/slovnik/STUPNICE%20V%C3%9DPOV%C4%9ADN%C3%8D%20DYNAMI%C4%8CNOSTI (accessed: 25 March 2021)
- Ludmila Uhlířová and Aleš Svoboda, "VÝPOVĚDNÍ DYNAMIČNOST" [Communicative dynamism] IN Petr Karlík, Marek Nekula and Jana Pleskalová (eds): CzechEncy - Nový encyklopedický slovník češtiny, online, 2017. https://www.czechency.org/slovnik/V%C3%9DPOV%C4%9ADN%C3%8D%20DYNAMI%C4%8CNOST (accessed: 25 March 2021)
