= Mathesius =

Mathesius is a Czech surname. Notable people with the surname include:

- Bohumil Mathesius (1888–1952), Czech poet, translator, publicist and literary scientist
- Johannes Mathesius (1504–1565), German-Bohemian minister and Lutheran reformer
  - Johannes Mathesius, the Younger (1544, Jáchymov – 1607), Bohemian-German physician
  - Paul Mathesius (1548, Jáchymov – 1584), Bohemian-German Lutheran theologian
- Vilém Mathesius (1882–1945), Czech linguist

Mathesius is also a surname of a Finnish family and may refer to:

- Johan Mathesius (1709–1765), pastor and politician of the Caps party
- Per Niklas Mathesius (1711–1772), pastor and politician of the Caps party, brother of Johan Mathesius
