= Roman Jakobson =

Russian linguist (1896–1982)

- Роман Якобсон
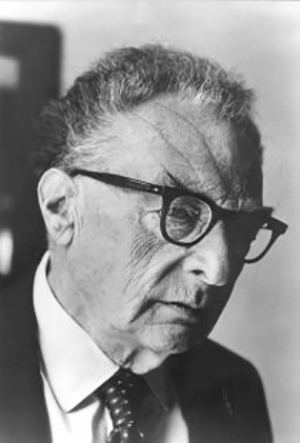
- Born: Roman Iosel-Berovich Yakobson; 10 October [O.S. 28 September] 1896; Moscow, Russia
- Died: 18 July 1982 (aged 85); Cambridge, Massachusetts, U.S.
- Spouse: Sofia Nikolajevna Feldmann

Education
- Education: Lazarev Institute of Oriental Languages; Moscow University
- Thesis: Über den Versbau der serbokroatischen Volksepen (1930)
- Doctoral advisor: Gerhard Gesemann

Philosophical work
- School: Moscow linguistic circle Prague linguistic circle
- Institutions: Karolinska Hospital; École libre des hautes études Columbia University; Harvard University; MIT
- Main interests: Linguistics
- Notable ideas: Jakobson's functions of language Markedness

Roman Osipovich Jakobson (Note: In this name that follows East Slavic naming customs, the patronymic is Osipovich and the family name is Yakobson.) (Note: Russian: Рома́н О́сипович Якобсо́н, romanized: Roman Osipovich Yakobson, IPA: [rɐˈman ˈosʲɪpəvʲɪt͡ɕ (j)ɪkɐpˈson].) (born Roman Iosel-Berovich Yakobson; (Note: Russian: Роман Иосель-Берович Якобсон.) 10 October [O.S. 28 September] 1896 – 18 July 1982) was a Russian linguist and literary theorist. A pioneer of structural linguistics, Jakobson was one of the most celebrated and influential linguists of the twentieth century. With Nikolai Trubetzkoy, he developed revolutionary new techniques for the analysis of linguistic sound systems, in effect founding the modern discipline of phonology. Jakobson went on to extend similar principles and techniques to the study of other aspects of language such as syntax, morphology and semantics. He made numerous contributions to Slavic linguistics, most notably two studies of Russian case and an analysis of the categories of the Russian verb. Drawing on insights from C. S. Peirce's semiotics, as well as from communication theory and cybernetics, he proposed methods for the investigation of poetry, music, and the visual arts including cinema.

Through his decisive influence on Claude Lévi-Strauss and Roland Barthes, among others, Jakobson became a pivotal figure in the adaptation of structural analysis to disciplines beyond linguistics, including philosophy, anthropology and literary theory; his development of the approach pioneered by Ferdinand de Saussure, known as "structuralism", became a major post-war intellectual movement in Europe and the United States. Meanwhile, though the influence of structuralism declined during the 1970s, Jakobson's work has continued to receive attention in linguistic anthropology, especially through the ethnography of communication developed by Dell Hymes and the semiotics of culture developed by Jakobson's former student Michael Silverstein. Jakobson's concept of underlying linguistic universals, particularly his celebrated theory of distinctive features, decisively influenced the early thinking of Noam Chomsky, who became the dominant figure in theoretical linguistics during the second half of the twentieth century.

== Life and work ==
Roman Iosel-Berovich Yakobson was born in Moscow on 10 October [O.S. 28 September] 1896 to well-to-do parents of Jewish descent, the industrialist Osip Jakobson and chemist Anna Volpert Jakobson, and he developed a fascination with language at a very young age. He studied at the Lazarev Institute of Oriental Languages and then at the Historical-Philological Faculty of Moscow University. As a student he was a leading figure of the Moscow linguistic circle and took part in Moscow's active world of avant-garde art and poetry; he was especially interested in Russian Futurism, the Russian incarnation of Italian Futurism. Under the pseudonym 'Aliagrov', he published books of zaum poetry and befriended the Futurists Vladimir Mayakovsky, Kazimir Malevich, Aleksei Kruchyonykh and others. It was the poetry of his contemporaries that partly inspired him to become a linguist.

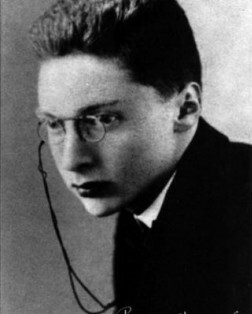
Yakobson before 1917

The linguistics of the time was overwhelmingly neogrammarian and insisted that the only scientific study of language was to study the history and development of words across time (the diachronic approach, in Saussure's terms). Jakobson, on the other hand, had come into contact with the work of Ferdinand de Saussure, and developed an approach focused on the way in which language's structure served its basic function (synchronic approach) – to communicate information between speakers. Jakobson was also well known for his critique of the emergence of sound in film. Jakobson received a master's degree from Moscow University in 1918.

=== In Czechoslovakia ===
Although he was initially an enthusiastic supporter of the Bolshevik revolution, Jakobson soon became disillusioned as his early hopes for an explosion of creativity in the arts fell victim to increasing state conservatism and hostility. He left Moscow for Prague in 1920, where he worked as a member of the Soviet diplomatic mission while continuing with his doctoral studies. Living in Czechoslovakia meant that Jakobson was physically close to the linguist who would be his most important collaborator during the 1920s and 1930s, Prince Nikolai Trubetzkoy, who fled Russia at the time of the Revolution and took up a chair at Vienna in 1922. In 1926 the Prague school of linguistic theory was established by the professor of English at Charles University, Vilém Mathesius, with Jakobson as a founding member and a prime intellectual force (other members included Trubetzkoy, René Wellek and Jan Mukařovský). Jakobson immersed himself in both the academic and cultural life of pre-World War II Czechoslovakia and established close relationships with a number of Czech poets and literary figures. Jakobson received his Ph.D. from Charles University in 1930. He became a professor at Masaryk University in Brno in 1933. He also made an impression on Czech academics with his studies of Czech verse.

Roman Jakobson proposed the Atlas Linguarum Europae in the late 1930s, but World War II disrupted this plan and it lay dormant until being revived by Mario Alinei in 1965.

=== Escapes before the war ===
Jakobson escaped from Prague in early March 1939 via Berlin for Denmark, where he was associated with the Copenhagen linguistic circle, and such intellectuals as Louis Hjelmslev. He fled to Norway on 1 September 1939, and in 1940 walked across the border to Sweden, where he continued his work at the Karolinska Hospital (with works on aphasia and language competence). When Swedish colleagues feared a possible German occupation, he managed to leave on a cargo ship, together with Ernst Cassirer (the former rector of Hamburg University) to New York City in 1941 to become part of the wider community of intellectual émigrés who fled there.

=== Career in the United States and later life ===
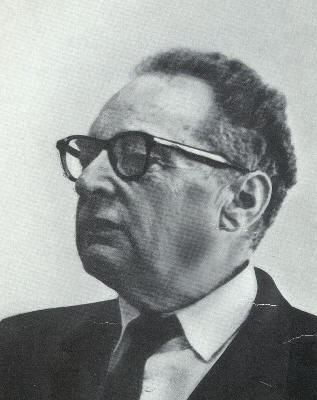
Roman Jakobson

In New York, he began teaching at École libre des hautes études, still closely associated with the Czech émigré community during that period. There, in a sort of Francophone university-in-exile, he met and collaborated with Claude Lévi-Strauss, who would also become a key exponent of structuralism. He also made the acquaintance of many American linguists and anthropologists, such as Franz Boas, Benjamin Whorf, and Leonard Bloomfield. When the American authorities considered "repatriating" him to Europe, it was Franz Boas who actually saved his life. From 1943 to 1949, Jakobson taught at Columbia University. After the war, he became a consultant to the International Auxiliary Language Association, which would present Interlingua in 1951.

In 1949 Jakobson moved to Harvard University, where he remained until his retirement in 1967. His universalizing structuralist theory of phonology, based on a markedness hierarchy of distinctive features, achieved its canonical exposition in a book published in the United States in 1951, jointly authored by Roman Jakobson, C. Gunnar Fant and Morris Halle. In the same year, Jakobson's theory of 'distinctive features' made a profound impression on the thinking of young Noam Chomsky, in this way also influencing generative linguistics. He was elected a foreign member of the Royal Netherlands Academy of Arts and Sciences in 1960.

In his last decade, Jakobson maintained an office at the Massachusetts Institute of Technology, where he was an honorary professor emeritus. In the early 1960s, Jakobson shifted his emphasis to a more comprehensive view of language and began writing about communication sciences as a whole. He converted to Eastern Orthodox Christianity in 1975.

Jakobson died in Cambridge, Massachusetts, on 18 July 1982. His widow died in 1986. His first wife, who was born in 1908, died in 2000.

== Intellectual contributions ==
According to Jakobson's own personal reminiscences, the most decisive stage in the development of his thinking was the period of revolutionary anticipation and upheaval in Russia between 1912 and 1920, when, as a young student, he fell under the spell of the celebrated Russian futurist wordsmith and linguistic thinker Velimir Khlebnikov.

Offering a slightly different picture, the preface to the second edition of The Sound Shape of Language argues that this book represents the fourth stage in "Jakobson's quest to uncover the function and structure of sound in language." The first stage was roughly the 1920s to 1930s where he collaborated with Trubetzkoy, in which they developed the concept of the phoneme, and elucidated the structure of phonological systems. The second stage, from roughly the late 1930s to the 1940s, during which he developed the notion that "binary distinctive features" were the foundational element in language, and that such distinctiveness is "mere otherness" or differentiation. In the third stage in Jakobson's work, from the 1950s to the 1960s, he worked with the acoustician C. Gunnar Fant and Morris Halle (a student of Jakobson's) to consider the acoustic aspects of distinctive features.

=== The communication functions ===
Influenced by the Organon-Modell by Karl Bühler, Jakobson distinguishes six communication functions, each associated with a dimension or factor of the communication process [n.b. – elements from Bühler's theory appear in the diagram below in yellow and pink, Jakobson's elaborations in blue]:

- Functions
1. referential (: contextual information)
2. aesthetic/poetic (: auto-reflection)
3. emotive (: self-expression)
4. conative (: vocative or imperative addressing of receiver)
5. phatic (: checking channel working)
6. metalingual (: checking code working)

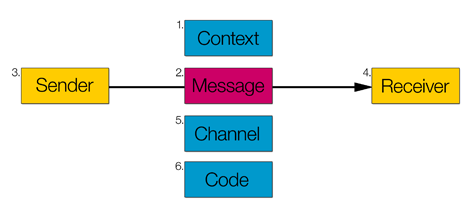

One of the six functions is always the dominant function in a text and usually related to the type of text. In poetry, the dominant function is the poetic function: the focus is on the message itself. The true hallmark of poetry is according to Jakobson "the projection of the principle of equivalence from the axis of selection to the axis of combination". Very broadly speaking, it implies that poetry successfully combines and integrates form and function, that poetry turns the poetry of grammar into the grammar of poetry, so to speak. Jakobson's theory of communicative functions was first published in "Closing Statements: Linguistics and Poetics" (in Thomas A. Sebeok, Style in Language, Cambridge Massachusetts, MIT Press, 1960, pp. 350–377). Despite its wide adoption, the six-functions model has been criticized for lacking specific interest in the "play function" of language that, according to an early review by Georges Mounin, is "not enough studied in general by linguistics researchers".

== Legacy ==
Jakobson's three principal ideas in linguistics play a major role in the field to this day: linguistic typology, markedness, and linguistic universals. The three concepts are tightly intertwined: typology is the classification of languages in terms of shared grammatical features (as opposed to shared origin), markedness is (very roughly) a study of how certain forms of grammatical organization are more "optimized" than others, and linguistic universals is the study of the general features of languages in the world. He also influenced Nicolas Ruwet's paradigmatic analysis.

Jakobson has also influenced Friedemann Schulz von Thun's four sides model, as well as Michael Silverstein's metapragmatics, Dell Hymes's ethnography of communication and ethnopoetics, the psychoanalysis of Jacques Lacan, and philosophy of Giorgio Agamben.

Jakobson's legacy among researchers specializing in Slavics, and especially Slavic linguistics in North America, has been enormous, for example, Olga Yokoyama.

== Honors and awards ==
- Hegel Prize (1982)

== Bibliography ==
- Jakobson R., Remarques sur l'évolution phonologique du russe comparée à celle des autres langues slaves. Prague, 1929 (Annotated English translation by Ronald F. Feldstein: Remarks on the Phonological Evolution of Russian in Comparison with the Other Slavic Languages. MIT Press: Cambridge, MA and London, 2018).
- Jakobson R., K charakteristike evrazijskogo jazykovogo sojuza. Prague, 1930.
- Jakobson R., Slavische Sprachfragen in der Sovjetunion (Slavische Rundschau, 1934, pp. 324-343).
- Jakobson R., Child Language, Aphasia and Phonological Universals, 1941.
- Jakobson R., On Linguistic Aspects of Translation, essay, 1959.
- Jakobson R., "Closing Statement: Linguistics and Poetics", in Style in Language (ed. Thomas Sebeok), 1960.
- Jakobson R., Selected Writings (ed. Stephen Rudy). The Hague, Paris, Mouton, in six volumes (1971–1985):
  - I. Phonological Studies, 1962;
  - II. Word and Language, 1971;
  - III. The Poetry of Grammar and the Grammar of Poetry, 1980;
  - IV. Slavic Epic Studies, 1966;
  - V. On Verse, Its Masters and Explores, 1978;
  - VI. Early Slavic Paths and Crossroads, 1985;
  - VII. Contributions to Comparative Mythology, 1985;
  - VIII. Major Works 1976–1980. Completion Volume 1, 1988;
  - IX.1. Completion, Volume 2/Part 1, 2013;
  - IX.1. Completion, Volume 2/Part 2, 2014.
- Jakobson R., Questions de poetique, 1973.
- Jakobson R., Six Lectures of Sound and Meaning, 1978.
- Jakobson R., The Framework of Language, 1980.
- Jakobson R., Halle M., Fundamentals of Language, 1956.
- Jakobson R., Waugh L., The Sound Shape of Language, 1979.
- Jakobson R., Pomorska K., Dialogues, 1983.
- Jakobson R., Verbal Art, Verbal Sign, Verbal Time (ed. Krystyna Pomorska and Stephen Rudy), 1985.
- Jakobson R., Language in Literature (ed. Krystyna Pomorska and Stephen Rudy), 1987.
- Jakobson R. "Shifters and Verbal Categories". On Language (ed. Linda R. Waugh and Monique Monville-Burston). 1990. 386–392.
- Jakobson R., La Génération qui a gaspillé ses poètes, Allia, 2001.

== Sources ==
- Esterhill, Frank (2000). Interlingua Institute: A History. New York: Interlingua Institute.
