= Four-sides model =

Communication theory model

Graphic of the four-sides model

The four-sides model (also known as communication square or four-ears model) is a communication model postulated in 1981 by German psychologist Friedemann Schulz von Thun. According to this model every message has four facets though not the same emphasis might be put on each. The four sides of the message are fact, self-disclosure, social relationship between sender and receiver, and wish or want.

== Background ==
The four-sides model also known as communication square or four-ears model is a communication model described in 1981 by German psychologist Friedemann Schulz von Thun. It describes the multi-layered structure of human utterances. In it von Thun combined the idea of a postulate (the second axiom) from psychologist Paul Watzlawick, that every message contains content and relational facets, with the three sides of the Organon model by Karl Bühler, that every message might reveal something about the sender, the receiver, and the request at hand. These models are part of the linguistic speech act theory.

== The four sides of communication ==
Per Schulz von Thun

- The factual layer contains statements which are matter of fact like data and facts, which are part of the message.
- In the self-revealing or self-disclosure the speaker – deliberately or unintentionally – reveals something about themself, their motives, values, emotions etc.
- In the relationship layer the speaker expresses, how the sender gets along with the receiver and what they think of each other.
- The wish or want contains the plea or desire, the advice, instruction and possibly the effects which the speaker is seeking.

Every layer of a message can be misunderstood by itself.

The classic example of Schulz von Thun is that of the couple in a car. The front-seat passenger tells the driver, his wife: "Hey, the traffic lights are green!" The driver will understand something different, depending on the ear with which she will hear, and will react differently. (On the matter of fact layer she will understand the "fact" "The traffic lights are green", she could understand it as "Come on, drive!" on the "command" layer, or on the "relationship" could hear a help like "I want to help you", possibly she interprets it as "I am in a hurry", the passenger reveals part of himself, "self-revelatory".) The emphasis on the four layers can be meant differently and also be understood differently. So the sender can stress the appeal of the statement and the receiver can mainly receive the relationship part of the message. Schulz von Thun states this as one of the main reasons for misunderstandings in communication.

=== The factual level ===
The factual level contains what the sender wants to inform about: On the factual level the sender of the news gives data, facts and information statements. It is the sender's task to send this information clearly and understandably. The receiver proves with the "Factual ear", whether the matter message fulfills the criteria of truth (true/untrue) or relevance (relevant/irrelevant) and the completeness (satisfying/something has to be added). In a well-coordinated team, this usually runs smoothly.

=== The self-revealing level ===
The self revealing level contains what the sender reveals about themself; It contains information about the sender. It may consist of consciously intended self-expression as well as unintended self-disclosure, which is not conscious to the sender (see also Johari window). Thus, every message becomes information about the personality of the sender. The self-revealing ear of the receiver perceives which information about the sender is hidden in the message.

=== The relationship level ===
The relationship layer expresses how the sender gets along with the receiver and what the sender thinks and feels about the receiver. Depending on how the sender talks to the receiver (way of expression, body language, intonation...) the sender expresses esteem, respect, friendliness, disinterest, contempt, or something else. The sender may express what they think about the receiver (you-statement) and how they get along (we-statement). Depending on which message the receiver hears with their relationship ear, they may feel either depressed, accepted or patronized. Good communication is distinguished by mutual appreciation.

=== The appeal or plea level ===
The appeal or want contains what the sender wants the receiver to do or think. According to von Thun whoever states something, will also affect something. This appeal-message should make the receiver do something or leave something undone. The attempt to influence someone can be less or more open (advice) or hidden (manipulation). With the appeal ear the receiver asks themself: "What should I do, think or feel now?"

== Example ==
Two people are eating a home-cooked meal together.

The one who didn't cook says: "There is something green in the soup."

Side	Sender	Receiver
Factual	There is something green.	There is something green.
Self-revealing	I don't know what it is.	You do not know what the green item is, and that makes you feel uncomfortable.
Relationship	You should know what it is.	You think my cooking is questionable.
Appeal	Tell me what it is!	I should only cook what you know in the future!

The other answers: "If you don't like the taste, you can cook it yourself."

This example demonstrates a misunderstanding due to differing interpretations by the sender's and receiver's ears about the intent conveyed with the message.

== See also ==
- Karl Bühler – German psychologist (1879–1963): Organon-Modell
- Communication theory – Proposed description of communication phenomena
- Organon model – Model of communication by Karl Bühler
- Roman Jakobson – Russian linguist (1896–1982): communication model
- Speech act – Utterance that serves a performative function
- Subtext – Aspect of communication that is not explicitly announced
- Interpersonal communication – Exchange of information among people

== Bibliography ==
- Friedemann Schulz von Thun: Miteinander reden: Störungen und Klärungen. Psychologie der zwischenmenschlichen Kommunikation. Rowohlt, Reinbek 1981. ISBN 3-499-17489-8
