= Libuše Dušková =

Czech linguist and university educator

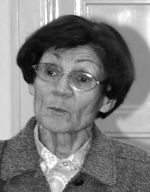
- Born: 27 January 1930 (age 96); Česká Třebová, Czechoslovakia
- Education: Charles University
- Known for: comprehensive academic grammar of English
- Scientific career
- Fields: English linguistics, structuralist-functionalist grammar of English, Functional Sentence Perspective, history of the Prague School

Libuše Dušková (Note: IPA: [ˈlɪbuʃɛ ˈduʃkovaː]) (née Mehlová; born 27 January 1930) is a Czech linguist. She specializes in the contrastive analysis of English grammar and functional syntax, and is a member of the Prague linguistic circle and a key representative of the Prague School of Linguistics. She is Professor Emerita of English Linguistics at Charles University. Her research spans a broad spectrum of topics in English linguistics, namely the verb phrase, the noun phrase, simple and complex sentences, the grammar-text interface, and aspects of the theory of Functional Sentence Perspective viewed through the lens of Jan Firbas' theories.

== Education ==
Libuše Dušková's interest in the study of languages, and English specifically, goes back to her secondary school years in Česká Třebová. She was a Gymnasium student, with a wide range of hobbies including piano, which she seriously considered studying at the conservatoire after passing the final exams. She was persuaded by her sister Hana to take also private lessons of English, in addition to the foreign languages taught at the Gymnasium: German, Latin and French.

After leaving the grammar school, her day-to-day contact with English intensified, and in 1949 she enrolled at the Faculty of Arts of Charles University to study English in combination with Czech. There, through lectures and seminars given by direct disciples of Vilém Mathesius—Josef Vachek, Ivan Poldauf, Zdeněk Vančura and Bohumil Trnka—she gained a solid knowledge of not only the English and Czech grammatical systems, but also the principles laid out by the Prague School of Linguistics.

== Academic career ==
She graduated in 1953, in an era when the Communist regime held a tight grip over the country's economic and political system, destroying any chances for her to study English at the postgraduate level. She managed to get a position as a lecturer of English at the Czechoslovak Academy of Sciences, which set off a thirty-year-long intermezzo before her return in 1985 to the English Department of the Faculty of Arts.

Besides teaching English at the academy's language departments, she steadily and consistently explored the intricacies of English grammar, always considering them against Czech corpus data and from the structuralist and functionalist perspective. Her publications since that period include not only research papers, but also English language coursebooks and practical English grammars, many of which are still popular and in use today.

In 1964, she completed her postgraduate studies, supervised by Professor Bohumil Trnka, and obtained the title of CSc. by defending a dissertation called Příspěvek k otázkám jazykové správnosti v současné angličtině [A contribution to questions of correctness in present-day English].

In 1988, three years after rejoining the English Department at the Faculty of Arts of Charles University, her prolific research culminated in the publishing of a widely acclaimed and, to this day, qualitatively unsurpassed academic grammar – Mluvnice současné angličtiny na pozadí češtiny [A Grammar of Contemporary English with Reference to Czech], the largest Czech corpus-based grammar of English:

"... intended for university students of English, i.e. future teachers, translators, etc. Consequently, it attempts to present language facts in a consistent theoretical framework which draws on domestic linguistic traditions (of English, general linguistic and Czech studies), as well as on English studies abroad. However, the theoretical framework remains largely implicit, being reflected merely in the manner of treatment."

In 1989, the fall of the oppressive regime in Czechoslovakia brought recognition to Libuše Dušková for her academic achievements, first in 1990 by the Faculty of Arts granting her the title of Associate Professor (Docent) and the Czech Academy of Sciences the title of DrSc. (Doctor of Sciences), followed by Charles University promoting her to the rank of Full Professor two years later.

Despite her formal retirement in 1996, Libuše Dušková is still an active member of the Department of English Language and ELT Methodology, giving lectures on English grammar and functional syntax in graduate and postgraduate courses, supervising Ph.D. theses, continuing her editorial duties as editor-in-chief of Linguistica Pragensia, and doing research that is widely respected both nationally and internationally:

"Some scholars are content to dig in a narrow field, revisiting again and again the patch of land in which they did their doctoral studies. But the great scholar will continually branch out into new and challenging areas – often ones neglected by others. This is certainly the case with Professor Dušková." – Geoffrey Leech

Libuše Dušková is the only Czech Anglicist whose work is referenced in A Comprehensive Grammar of the English Language, as well as in Longman Grammar of Spoken and Written English.

In addition to her own research activities, she has provided in-depth accounts of careers of the Prague School's key members, and translated into English the School's canonical works, such as Mathesius' A Functional Analysis of Present Day English on a General Linguistic Basis and Vachek's Dictionary of the Prague School of Linguistics.

== Selected bibliography ==
A full bibliography of Libuše Dušková's work, covering years 1954–2010, is available as "Publications of Professor Libuše Dušková" IN ... for thy speech bewrayeth thee (A Festschrift for Libuše Dušková). Prague: Karolinum, 2010: 329–350. ISBN 9788073082994.

=== Monographs and collected works ===
- Dušková. L. (2015) From Syntax to Text: the Janus Face of Functional Sentence Perspective. Prague: Karolinum. ISBN 9788024629179.
- Dušková, L. (1999) Studies in the English Language, Parts 1 and 2. Prague: Karolinum. ISBN 8071846147.
- Dušková, L. et al. (1994) Mluvnice současné angličtiny na pozadí češtiny [A Grammar of Contemporary English with Reference to Czech]. Second Edition. Prague: Academia. ISBN 8020004866. Co-authors: Z. Strnadová (Chapter 9: Předložky [Prepositions]), D. Knittlová, J. Peprník & J. Tárnyiková (Section 13.5: Přívlastek [Attribute]). An online version has been published as Dušková, L. et al. (2013) Elektronická mluvnice současné angličtiny [Electronic Grammar of Contemporary English]. Prague: Charles University. emsa.ff.cuni.cz.

=== Scholarly papers and chapters ===
- Dušková, L. (2018) "Parallel corpora and contrastive linguistics: Where to look for pitfalls in the translation of information structure". Bergen Language and Linguistic Studies 9 (1): 5–19. ISSN 1892-2449.
- Dušková, L. (2015) "Czech Approaches to Information Structure: Theory and Applications" IN A Bibliography of Functional Sentence Perspective 1956 - 2011 (Czech and Slovak Authors, Firbasian Approach Oriented). Brno: Masaryk University Press, pp. 9–32. ISBN 9788021071117.
- Dušková, L. (2014) "English studies at Charles University and the Prague Linguistic Circle: The contribution of English studies to the Circle’s constitution and linguistic theories”. La Linguistique 50 (1): 93–118. ISSN 0075-966X.
- Dušková, L. (2013) "Prague School of Linguistics" IN Theory in Social and Cultural Anthropology (An Encyclopedia) – Volume 2. Los Angeles: SAGE Reference, pp. 654–657. ISBN 9781412999632.
- Dušková, L. (2010) "On Bohumil Trnka’s concept of neutralization and its nature on the higher language levels" IN The Prague School and Theories of Structure: Interfacing Science, Literature, and the Humanities. Goettingen: V&R, pp. 87–103. ISBN 9783899717044.
- Dušková, L. (2010) "Syntactic Construction, Information Structure and Textual Role: An Interface View of the Cleft Sentence". Brno Studies in English 36 (1): 29–45. ISSN 0524-6881.
- Dušková, L. (2008) "Vztahy mezi sémantikou a aktuálním členěním z pohledu anglistických členů Pražského lingvistického kroužku" [The relations between semantics and FSP as seen by Anglicist members of the Prague Linguistic Circle]. Slovo a slovesnost 69 (1-2): 67–77. ISSN 2571-0885.
- Dušková, L. (2003) "Constancy of syntactic function across languages" IN Language and Function: To the memory of Jan Firbas. Amsterdam: John Benjamins, pp. 127–145. ISBN 9789027296733.
- Dušková, L. (1999) "Basic Distribution of Communicative Dynamism vs. Nonlinear Indication of Functional Sentence Perspective" IN Prague Linguistic Circle Papers - Travaux du cercle linguistique de Prague nouvelle série (3). Amsterdam: John Benjamins, pp. 249–261. ISBN 9789027275066.
- Dušková, L. (1991) "English Grammars in Postwar Czechoslovakia" IN English Traditional Grammars: An International Perspective. Amsterdam: John Benjamins, pp. 175–204. ISBN 9789027277695.
- Dušková, L. (1969) "On sources of errors in foreign language learning". International Review of Applied Linguistics in Language Teaching 7 (1): 11–36. ISSN 0019-042X.
- Mehlová, L. (1954) "Anglická kausativa" [English causative verbs]. Acta Universitatis Carolinae 7 (4): 37–42.

=== Coursebooks ===
- Dušková, L. (1974) Úvodní kurs k angličtině pro vědecké a odborné pracovníky: kurs pro středně pokročilé [English for academic workers. Intermediate (An introductory course)]. Prague: Czechoslovak Academy of Sciences.
- Dušková, L., V. Rejtharová & L. Bubeníková (1970) Mluvená angličtina pro vědecké a odborné pracovníky [Spoken English for academic workers]. Prague: Czechoslovak Academy of Sciences.
- Dušková, L. & L. Bubeníková (1965) Angličtina pro vědecké a odborné pracovníky: kurs pro středně pokročilé [English for academic workers. Intermediate]. Prague: Czechoslovak Academy of Sciences.
- Dušková, L., L. Bubeníková & J. Caha (1961) Angličtina pro vědecké a odborné pracovníky: základní kurs [English for academic workers. Elementary]. Prague: Czechoslovak Academy of Sciences.
- Dušková, L., L. Bubeníková & J. Caha (1959) Stručná mluvnice angličtiny [A brief grammar of English]. Prague: Czechoslovak Academy of Sciences.

=== Translations and editorial work ===
- Mathesius, V. (1975, 2013) A Functional Analysis of Present Day English on a General Linguistic Basis. Edited by J. Vachek. Translated by L. Dušková. The Hague: Mouton. ISBN 9783110813296.
- Vachek, J. (2003) Dictionary of the Prague School of linguistics. Edited by L. Dušková, translated by L. Dušková, A. Klégr, J. Čermák, P. Šaldová and M. Malá. Amsterdam: John Benjamins. ISBN 9789027296542.
- Dušková, L. & P. A. Luelsdorff (eds) (1983) Praguiana: Some Basic and Less Known Aspects of the Prague Linguistic School. Selected, translated and edited by J. Vachek and L. Dušková. Amsterdam: John Benjamins. ISBN 9789027280398.
