= Communicative =

Communicative may refer to:

- Communicative action, cooperative action undertaken by individuals based upon mutual deliberation and argumentation
- Communicative competence, encompassing a language user's grammatical and social knowledge
- Communicative disorders assistant (CDA), an allied health profession
- Communicative dynamism, a linguistics notion
- Communicative ecology, conceptual model used within media and communications research
- Communicative language teaching, or the communicative approach, approach to language teaching emphasizing interaction as both the means and the goal of study
- Communicative planning, an approach to urban planning
- Communicative rationality, theory (or a set of them) describing human rationality as a necessary outcome of successful communication
