= Organon (disambiguation) =

The Organon is the name given by Aristotle’s followers to his works on logic.

Organon may also refer to:

- Organon, a system of principles by Immanuel Kant, whereby knowledge may be established
- The Organon of the Healing Art, title of Samuel Hahnemann’s 1810 book on homeopathy
- Organon International, a former Dutch pharmaceutical company
- Organon & Co., an American pharmaceutical company spun off from Merck & CO.
- Organon model, a model of communication formulated by Karl Bühler

== See also ==
- Organum, a type of medieval polyphony
- Orgonon, the home, laboratory and research center of the Austrian psychiatrist Wilhelm Reich
