= Allusion =

Figure of speech using indirect reference

Allusion, or alluding, is a figure of speech that makes a reference to someone or something (a person, object, location, etc.) without mentioning it by name or without explaining how it relates to the given context, so that the audience must realize the connection in their own minds. When a connection is directly and explicitly explained (as opposed to indirectly implied), it is instead often simply termed a reference. In the arts, a literary allusion puts the alluded text in a new context under which it assumes new meanings and denotations. Literary allusion is closely related to parody and pastiche, which are also "text-linking" literary devices.

In a wider, more informal context, an allusion is a passing or casual short statement indicating broader meaning. It is an incidental mention of something, either directly or by implication, such as "In the stock market, he met his Waterloo."

== Scope of the term ==
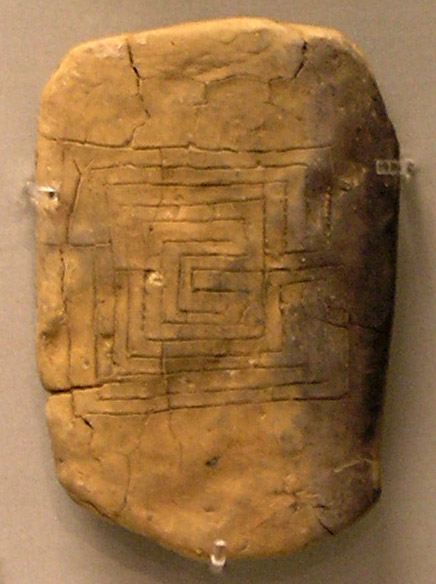
Backside of a clay tablet from Pylos bearing the motif of the Labyrinth, an allusion to the mythological fight of Theseus and the Minotaur

In the most traditional sense, allusion is a literary term, though the word has also come to encompass indirect references to any source, including allusions in film or the visual arts. In literature, allusions are used to link concepts that the reader already has knowledge of, with concepts discussed in the story. It is not possible to predetermine the nature of all the new meanings and inter-textual patterns that an allusion will generate. In the field of film criticism, a filmmaker's intentionally unspoken visual reference to another film is also called an homage. It may even be sensed that real events have allusive overtones, when a previous event is inescapably recalled by a current one. "Allusion is bound up with a vital and perennial topic in literary theory, the place of authorial intention in interpretation", William Irwin observed, in asking "What is an allusion?"

Without the hearer or reader comprehending the author's intention, an allusion becomes merely a decorative device. Allusion is an economical device, a figure of speech that uses a relatively short space to draw upon the ready stock of ideas, cultural memes or emotion already associated with a topic. Thus, an allusion is understandable only to those with prior knowledge of the covert reference in question, a mark of their cultural literacy.

== Allusion as cultural bond ==
The origin of allusion is from the Latin noun allusionem "a playing with, a reference to", from alludere "to play, jest, make fun of", a compound of ad "to" + ludere "to play". Recognizing the point of allusion's condensed riddle also reinforces cultural solidarity between the maker of the allusion and the hearer: their shared familiarity with allusion bonds them. Ted Cohen finds such a "cultivation of intimacy" to be an essential element of many jokes. Some aspect of the referent must be invoked and identified for the tacit association to be made; the allusion is indirect in part because "it depends on something more than mere substitution of a referent".

The allusion depends as well on the author's intent; a reader may search out parallels to a figure of speech or a passage, of which the author was unaware, and offer them as unconscious allusions—coincidences that a critic might not find illuminating. Addressing such issues is an aspect of hermeneutics.

William Irwin remarks that allusion moves in only one direction: "If A alludes to B, then B does not allude to A. The Bible does not allude to Shakespeare, though Shakespeare may allude to the Bible." Irwin appends a note: "Only a divine author, outside of time, would seem capable of alluding to a later text." This is the basis for Christian readings of Old Testament prophecy, which assert that passages are to be read as allusions to future events.

Allusion differs from the similar term intertextuality in that it is an intentional effort on the author's part. The success of an allusion depends in part on at least some of its audience "getting" it. Allusions may be made increasingly obscure, until at last they are understood by the author alone, who thereby retreats into a private language.

== Academic analysis of the concept of allusions ==
In discussing the richly allusive poetry of Virgil's Georgics, R. F. Thomas distinguished six categories of allusive reference, which are applicable to a wider cultural sphere. These types are:

1. Casual reference, "the use of language which recalls a specific antecedent, but only in a general sense" that is relatively unimportant to the new context;
2. Single reference, in which the hearer or reader is intended to "recall the context of the model and apply that context to the new situation"; such a specific single reference in Virgil, according to Thomas, is a means of "making connections or conveying ideas on a level of intense subtlety";
3. Self-reference, where the locus is in the poet's own work;
4. Corrective allusion, where the imitation is clearly in opposition to the original source's intentions;
5. Apparent reference "which seems clearly to recall a specific model but which on closer inspection frustrates that intention"; and
6. Multiple reference or conflation, which refers in various ways simultaneously to several sources, fusing and transforming the cultural traditions.

A type of literature has grown round explorations of the allusions in such works as Alexander Pope's The Rape of the Lock or T. S. Eliot's The Waste Land.

== Examples ==
In Homer, brief allusions could be made to mythic themes of generations previous to the main narrative because they were already familiar to the epic's hearers: one example is the theme of the Calydonian boar hunt. In Hellenistic Alexandria, literary culture and a fixed literary canon known to readers and hearers made a densely allusive poetry effective; the poems of Callimachus offer the best-known examples.

Martin Luther King Jr., alluded to the Gettysburg Address in starting his "I Have a Dream" speech by saying "Five score years ago..."; his hearers were immediately reminded of Abraham Lincoln's "Four score and seven years ago", which opened the Gettysburg Address. King's allusion effectively called up parallels in two historic moments without overwhelming his speech with details.

A sobriquet is an allusion. By metonymy one aspect of a person or other referent is selected to identify it, and it is this shared aspect that makes a sobriquet evocative: for example, "the city that never sleeps" is a sobriquet of (and therefore an allusion to) New York.

== Bibliography ==
- Ben-Porot, Ziva (1976) The Poetics of Literary Allusion, p. 108, in PTL: A Journal for descriptive poetics and theory of literature 1
- Irwin, William (2001). "What Is an Allusion?" The Journal of Aesthetics and Art Criticism, 59 (3): 287–297.
- Irwin, W. T. (2002). "The Aesthetics of Allusion." Journal of Value Inquiry: 36 (4).
- Pasco, Allan H. Allusion: A Literary Graft. 1994. Charlottesville: Rookwood Press, 2002.
