= Inner Team =

Personality model

The inner team is a personality model created by German psychologist Friedemann Schulz von Thun. The plurality of the human inner life or facets of the personality (Self) is presented using a metaphor of a team and a team leader. This is supposed to support the self-clarification process and by doing so set the foundation for a clear and authentic external communication.

== Motivation ==
In the first two volumes of his seminal work Miteinander reden (English: Talking to each other), Schulz von Thun deals with the topic of functioning communication. In 1998, Thun published Miteinander reden 3, which expands his theory of communication to the notion of the inner team. By introducing the model of the inner team, he wants to provide instructions for self-help.

The inner team is a modification of the "parts party", a method from systemic family therapy, which was developed by Virginia Satir in the 1970s. Additionally, his model draws upon the interacting parts of the personality within a human being that, amongst others, have been described by Margaret Paul and Erika J. Chopich.

== The Inner Team Member ==
The inner team and its team members are a metaphor. Each member of the inner team thus represents an inner part or aspect of the whole personality. It is neither a pluralistic subpersonality in the sense of multiple personalities, nor is it to be confused with behaviors. Visible behavior is the result of an inner process. Each team member only wants the best for the team manager. Behavior can therefore only rarely be permanently and inevitably associated with one single team member.

Team members differ in various ways: they are loud or quiet, are slow or fast to join the conversation, are dominant with external contacts or only show inwards where they appear as thoughts, emotions, impulses, moods or bodily signals. Between the team members, there are group dynamics similar to the external life. In their entirety, they mirror the life experience of a human, including the opinion of parents, friends and life partners, or values of a society of which one feels part.

== The Team Leader ==
The team leader is described by Schulz von Thun as the superordinate "I", the cohesive entity, which either passively follows the dialogue of its team members or actively interferes, but which always has the last word with externally effective decisions. Many aspects of actual team leadership can be transferred to the inner team leader.

== The Inner Team Meeting ==
If a human being has to make a difficult decision, it more or less consciously has inner team meetings. In reality, mess, inconsistent statements (e.g. bad gut feeling vs. rational argument) and the dominance of the loud, fast, and popular team members often shape the not consciously controlled team meetings. Still, the team leader is successful at precipitating a satisfactory decision in many cases, thanks to their practice. For especially difficult or unfamiliar decisions, this does not have to be the case anymore. That is when Schulz von Thun recommends a team meeting.

For this, those team members who want to comment on the question have to be identified. Often, this works well, if one takes time to listen to what is going on inside oneself. Afterwards, each team member should have the right to bring forward their message without encountering criticism. A free discussion offers everyone the chance to meet each other head-on. The team leader should pay attention in order to be able to summarize the controversial questions and positions. The team leaders needs to remain neutral and should value all opinions. On the basis of this, one can think about a compromise, much like in real teams. Finally, the result can be summarized and the approval from all participants can be sought.

== Further aspects of the Inner Team ==
The metaphor of the inner team can be utilized even more widely. In Miteinander reden 3, Schulz von Thun also introduces the following concepts:

- inner conflict management;
- non-acceptance of team members and its consequences;
- team building in inner and external contact;
- situation-dependent team composition.

== See also ==
- Cartesian theater
- Nonviolent Communication
- Ego-state therapy
- Four-sides model (differences in external communication)
- Autocommunication
- Dialogical self
- Internal Family Systems Model
- Inside Out (an animated film about a girl with an inner team of personified emotions)

== Literature ==
- Schulz von Thun, Friedemann (1998). Miteinander reden 3 – Das 'innere Team' und situationsgerechte Kommunikation [Talking to each other 3 – The 'inner team' and situation-appropriate communication] (in German). Reinbek: Rowohlt. ISBN 3499605457.
- Schulz von Thun, Friedemann; Stegemann, Wibke (2004). Das Innere Team in Aktion. Praktische Arbeit mit dem Modell [The inner team in action. Practical work with the model] (in German). Reinbek: Rowohlt. ISBN 3499616440.
