= Functional sentence perspective =

In linguistics, functional sentence perspective (FSP) is a theory describing the information structure of the sentence and language communication in general. It has been developed in the tradition of the Prague School of Functional and Structural Linguistics together with its sister theory, Topic-Focus Articulation.

The key concepts of FSP were laid down by Jan Firbas in the mid-1950s on the basis of the linguistic work of Vilém Mathesius, especially his idea of functional syntax in linguistic characterology of language.

== Terminology ==
The term 'functional sentence perspective' was created by Jan Firbas as a more convenient English equivalent of Mathesius’ Czech term aktuální členění větné:

“It is not without interest to note that Mathesius, who knew Weil’s work, coined the felicitous term ‘aktuální členění větné. … As English 'actual' is not an exact equivalent of Czech ‘aktuální’, another term had to be found for English. I accepted Professor Josef Vachek’s suggestion and started using the term 'functional sentence perspective' (FSP; Firbas 1957). The term is based on Mathesius’ term ‘Satzperspektive’. Vachek’s suggestion has added the qualification ‘functional’. This is the way the term 'functional sentence perspective' (FSP) has found its way into the literature.”

— Firbas, 1994, p. 4

Within Czech linguistics the Czech calque of the English term Functional Sentence Perspective funkční větná perspektiva is nowadays used to refer to the approach stemming from the writings of Jan Firbas and his followers, while the original Mathesius’ Czech term aktuální členění větné tends to be associated with the group of linguists developing the Topic-Focus Articulation, i.e. Petr Sgall, Eva Hajičová, Jarmila Panevová and their disciples, despite the fact that both terms are still sometimes used interchangeably in some Czech contributions to the topic of information structure of language. (Cf. Karlík - Nekula - Pleskalová (2002))

=== Key terms ===
- communicative dynamism
- theme, theme proper, diatheme, hypertheme, thematic progressions
- transition, transition proper
- rheme, rheme proper, rhematizers
- communicative units, communicative fields

==== FSP factors ====
- sentence linearity
- Firbasian dynamic semantic scales, dynamic semantic functions
- context
- prosody

== Key researchers ==
- František Daneš
- Libuše Dušková
- Jan Firbas
- Vilém Mathesius
- Aleš Svoboda

== See also ==
- Topic-comment
- Prague school (linguistics)
- Functional theories of grammar
