= Aleš Svoboda (linguist) =

Czech linguist and university professor

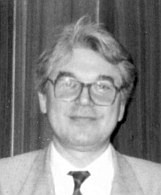
Aleš Svoboda in 1997

Aleš Svoboda (2 April 1941 – 9 January 2010) was a Czech linguist, university professor, and a prominent representative of the Prague School of linguistics.

== Biography ==
Svoboda was born on 2 April 1941 in Zlín. He initially studied music and clarinet at Brno conservatoire, but later his keen interest in languages brought him to study English, German and Czech at the Faculty of Arts of Masaryk University. In 1970 he became an Assistant Professor of the Department of English and American Studies at the faculty. He was promoted to the rank of Associate Professor at Charles University in Prague in 1981 and to Full Professor at Masaryk University in Brno in 1992. Apart from Masaryk University in Brno, he also taught at Silesian University in Opava and at the University of Ostrava (both in the Czech Republic), and at University of Prešov (Slovakia).

He was a disciple and close collaborator of Professor Jan Firbas and together with him a lead investigator of a theory of Information Structure of language called Functional Sentence Perspective (FSP), inspired by the work of Vilém Mathesius. He wrote many papers on the topic, two monographs and 50 encyclopedic entries describing FSP. His most important contribution to the development of the theory of Functional Sentence Perspective was its application to the subclausal level.

He died on 9 January 2010 in Opava.
