= Functional load =

Notion in linguistics

In linguistics and especially phonology, functional load, or phonemic load, is the collection of words that contain a certain pronunciation feature (a phoneme) that makes distinctions between other words. Phonemes with a high functional load distinguish a large number of words from other words, and phonemes with a low functional load distinguish relatively fewer words from other words. The omission or mishearing of features with a high functional load thus leads to more confusion than features with a low functional load.

== Overview ==
The term "functional load" goes back to the days of the Prague School; references to it can be found in the work of Vilém Mathesius in 1929. Its most vocal advocate was André Martinet, a historical linguist who claimed it was a factor in the likelihood of a phonological merger.

The first suggested measurement for functional load was the number of minimal pairs, but that does not take into account word frequency and is difficult to generalize beyond binary phonemic oppositions. Charles Hockett proposed an information theoretic definition in 1955, which has since been generalized. Now, with a large text corpus, one can compute the functional load of any phonological contrast including distinctive features, suprasegmentals, and distinctions between groups of phonemes. For instance, the functional load of tones in Mandarin Chinese is as high as that of vowels: the information lost when all tones sound alike is as much as that lost when all vowels sound alike.

Martinet predicted that perceptually similar pairs of phonemes with low functional load would merge. This has not been proved empirically; indeed, all empirical tests have come out against it; for example, /n/ merged with /l/ in Cantonese in word-initial position in the late 20th century although of all the consonants in binary opposition to /n/, only the /n/-/m/ opposition had a higher functional load than the /n/-/l/ opposition.

== Examples ==
=== English ===
English vowels, for example, have a very high functional load. There are innumerable sets of words distinguished just by their vowels, such as pin, pen, pan, pun, pain, pine. Voicing is similar, as can be seen in pat - bad, few - view. Speakers who do not control these differences make it very difficult for others to understand them.

However, although voicing is generally important in English, the voicing difference between the two fricatives written ⟨th⟩, /θ, ð/, has a very low functional load: it is difficult to find meaningful distinctions dependent solely on this difference. One of the few examples is thigh vs. thy although the two can be distinguished from context alone. Similar is the difference of /dʒ/ (written ⟨j⟩, ⟨ge⟩, etc.) versus /ʒ/ (resulting from /z + j/, or the ⟨j⟩, ⟨ge⟩, etc. in some recent French loanwords), as in virgin vs. version. The difference between the two ⟨ng⟩ sounds, [ŋ, ŋɡ], found in singer and finger, is so unimportant that it makes no practical difference if one confuses them, and some dialects pronounce the sounds the same in both words. The functional load is nearly zero, which is unsurprising since the phoneme /ŋ/ originated as a coalescence of [ŋɡ] when it was word- or morpheme-final.

An ongoing example would be the merger of the AIR and EAR vowels in New Zealand English. The phonetic similarity between words like here and hare does not seem to hamper oral communication greatly if context is provided. Therefore, those vowels have low functional load in New Zealand English despite their high frequency of occurrences in that dialect. The distinction is fully maintained in nearby Australian English, where many find comedy and confusion in mergers such as sheep-sharing vs. sheep-shearing.

=== Mandarin ===
The functional load of tone in Mandarin Chinese is approximately equal to the functional load of vowels. The loss of information when all tones sound alike in Mandarin is approximately equal to that when all vowels sound alike.

By contrast, in many Bantu languages, the tones have a low functional load, and in Swahili, tones have disappeared altogether.
