= Aleš Klégr =

Czech linguist (born 1951)

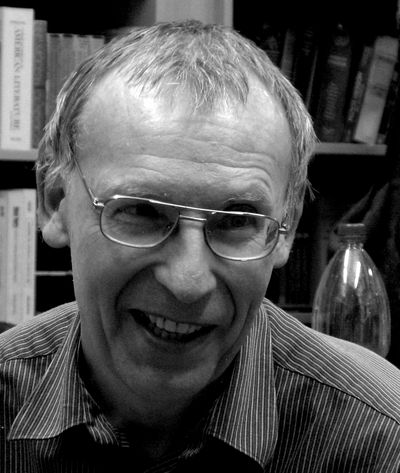
- Born: 27 November 1951 (age 74)

Academic background
- Education: Charles University

Aleš Klégr (born 27 November 1951) is a Czech linguist, professor of English language at Charles University in Prague. He specializes, among others, in lexicology, lexicography, semantics and morphology.

As a student of English (along with psychology) at Charles University in Prague, he was a pupil of Prague school linguists Bohumil Trnka and Ivan Poldauf. Having started his academic career as researcher with the Encyclopaedic Institute, Czech Academy of Sciences, and instructor at several university language centres, he joined the Department of English and American Studies (1990–2008) and later the Department of English Language and ELT Methodology (2008- ) at Faculty of Arts, Charles University in Prague, where he found formative inspiration in a long-term cooperation with Libuše Dušková, Bohumil Trnka's prominent successor.

A reader (1996) and professor (2004) of English language, Aleš Klégr has studied systemic and textual relations between English and Czech on the grammatical and lexical level. He is a member of the Czech Association for the Study of English (under the European Society for the Study of English) and of the Prague linguistic circle. He is the author of The Noun in Translation (1996); English Complex Prepositions of the Type in spite of and Analogous Sequences Praha 2002), Česko-anglický slovník spojení: podstatné jméno a sloveso (2005) and Tezaurus jazyka českého (2007).

== Additional bibliography ==
- Rogetův Thesaurus a onomaziologická lexikografie, Časopis pro moderní filologii 82, 65-84, 2000;
- Coordination as a factor in article usage, Brno Studies in English 28, 27-56 (2002, s Libuší Duškovou);
- Modality in Czech and English. Possibility Particles and the Conditional Mood in a Parallel Corpus, International Journal of Corpus Linguistics 9, 83-95 (2004, s Františkem Čermákem);
- Wellingtons or Elliptic Shortening, Prague Studies in English 23, Acta Universitatis Carolinae, 95-110 (2004);
- Sadness/smutek: a comparison of the verbal collocates, in: Čermák, J. et al. (eds.), Patterns. A Festschrift for Libuše Dušková, Praha, FF UK, 91-105;
- Kolokační faux amis, in: Čermák, F. et al. (eds.), Kolokace, Praha (2006, s Pavlínou Šaldovou);
- Onomasiological Cycle: Up the Down Staircase, Prague Studies in English 24, Acta Universitatis Carolinae, 7-18 (2006, s Janem Čermákem).
