= Jakobson's functions of language =

Theory of language

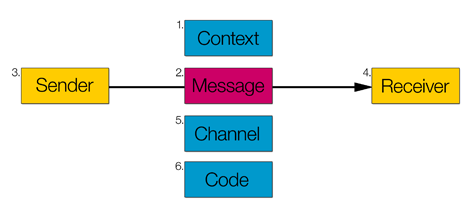
The six factors of an effective verbal communication. Each corresponds to a communication function (not displayed in this picture).

Roman Jakobson defined six functions of language (or communication functions), according to which an effective act of verbal communication can be described. Each of the functions has an associated factor. For this work, Jakobson was influenced by Karl Bühler's organon model, to which he added the poetic, phatic and metalingual functions.

== The six functions of language ==
- The referential function: corresponds to the factor of context and describes a situation, object or mental state. The descriptive statements of the referential function can consist of both definite descriptions and deictic words, e.g. "The autumn leaves have all fallen now." Similarly, the referential function is associated with an element whose true value is under questioning especially when the truth value is identical in both the real and assumptive universe.
- The poetic function: focuses on "the message for its own sake" (how the code is used) and is the operative function in poetry as well as slogans.
- The emotive (Note: Alternatively called "expressive" or "affective".) function: relates to the Addresser (sender) and is best exemplified by interjections and other sound changes that do not alter the denotative meaning of an utterance but do add information about the Addresser's (speaker's) internal state, e.g. "Wow, what a view!" Whether a person is experiencing feelings of happiness, sadness, grief or otherwise, they use this function to express themselves.
- The conative function: engages the Addressee (receiver) directly and is best illustrated by vocatives and imperatives, e.g. "Tom! Come inside and eat!"
- The phatic function: is language for the sake of interaction and is therefore associated with the Contact/Channel factor. The phatic function can be observed in greetings and casual discussions of the weather, particularly with strangers. It also provides the keys to open, maintain, verify or close the communication channel: "Hello?", "OK?", "Hummm", "Bye"...
- The metalingual (alternatively called "metalinguistic" or "reflexive") function: is the use of language (what Jakobson calls "Code") to discuss or describe itself.

== Bibliography ==
- Duranti, Alessandro (1997). Linguistic anthropology. New York: Cambridge University Press. ISBN 978-0-511-81019-0. OCLC 191952948.
- Hébert, Louis (2011). "The Functions of Language". Signo. Rimouski, Quebec: Université du Québec à Rimouski.
- Jakobson, Roman (1960). "Closing statements: Linguistics and Poetics" (PDF). In Sebeok, Thomas Albert (ed.). Style in language. New-York: M.I.T. p. 470. ISBN 978-0-262-69010-2.
