= Charlotte Bühler =

German-American psychologist

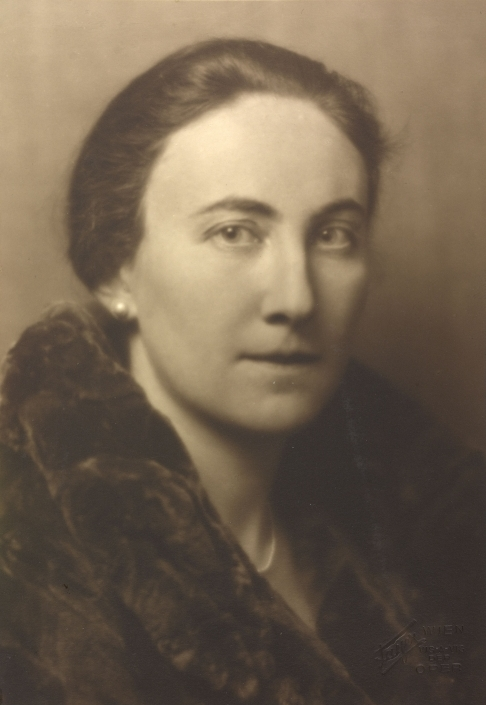
- Born: Charlotte Berta Malachowski; December 20, 1893; Berlin, Prussia
- Died: February 3, 1974 (aged 80); Stuttgart, West Germany
- Citizenship: German (1893–1945); American (1945–1974)
- Education: University of Freiburg; Friedrich Wilhelm University of Berlin; Ludwig-Maximilians-Universität München
- Known for: Work on child psychology, adolescent psychology, gerontopsychology
- Spouse: Karl Bühler (m. 1916–1963) (his death)
- Children: Ingeborg, Rolf
- Scientific career
- Fields: Child psychology Developmental psychology
- Workplaces: Technical University of Dresden; University of Vienna; University of Oslo; Minneapolis General Hospital; Los Angeles County Hospital; University of Southern California
- Thesis: Über Gedankenentstehung: Experimentelle Untersuchungen zur Denkpsychologie ("On the origin of thought: Experimental studies on the psychology of thought") (1918)

Charlotte Bühler (née Malachowski; 20 December 1893 – 3 February 1974) was a German-American developmental psychologist.

== Life ==
Bühler was born Charlotte Berta Malachowski in Berlin, the elder of two children of Jewish government architect Hermann Malachowski, and his wife Rose (née Kristeller).

After graduating from high school in 1913, Charlotte Malachowski studied natural sciences and humanities at the University of Freiburg and the Friedrich Wilhelm University of Berlin. In 1918, she received her doctorate from the Ludwig-Maximilians-Universität München with a dissertation on the topic Über Gedankenentstehung: Experimentelle Untersuchungen zur Denkpsychologie ("On the origin of thought: Experimental studies on the psychology of thought"). That same year she went to Dresden to work with Karl Bühler, where she continued her research in the fields of child and youth psychology, as well as working on her habilitation. In 1920, she completed her habilitation at the Technical University of Dresden and became qualified to teach in Saxony.

She married Karl Bühler on April 4, 1916. Their daughter Ingeborg was born in 1917, and their son Rolf in 1919. Karl died in 1963 in Los Angeles, California. She herself fell ill in 1970 and returned in 1971 to live with her children in Stuttgart, where she died at the age of 80.

== Academic appointments ==
In 1923, Charlotte Bühler went to teach at the University of Vienna, where in 1929 she was promoted to the position of associate professor. Both Bühlers worked closely together at this new institution, which provided them with a laboratory to conduct their research.

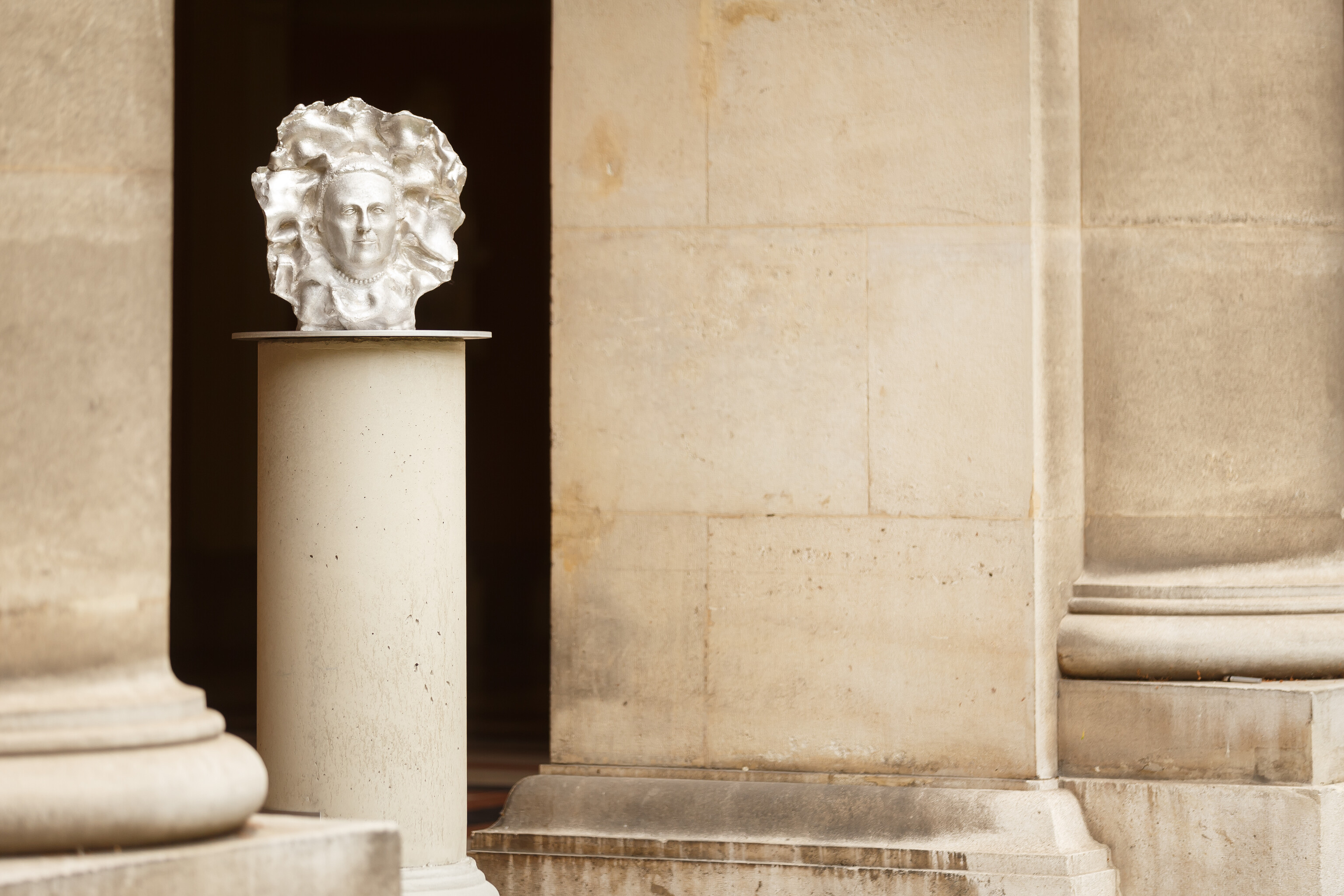
Monument to Charlotte Bühler at the University of Vienna

In the next few years at Vienna she gained international prestige through her research and publications which led to the development of the "Viennese child psychology school" of Charlotte Bühler - the spirit of which is still maintained today in the Charlotte Bühler Institute.

In March 1938, during a stay in London, she learned of the occupation of Austria by Nazi Germany. Karl Bühler was taken into "protective custody" on March 23, 1938, due to his vocal anti-Nazi sentiments. Via connections in Norway, Charlotte Bühler arranged the release of her husband after six and a half weeks, and in October 1938 the family was reunited in Oslo. Because Charlotte Bühler was of Jewish descent they immigrated to the United States.

Both Bühlers were offered professorships in 1938 by Fordham University in New York City, which, however, did not materialize. Karl Bühler then accepted a professorship in Saint Paul, Minnesota; however, Charlotte Bühler remained in Norway because she had already accepted a professorship at the University of Oslo and a position at the Teachers' Academy in Trondheim. Only after an urgent request by her husband did she emigrate in 1940 to Saint Paul in the United States, where she arrived shortly before the invasion of Norway.

In 1942, she accepted a position as senior psychologist at the Minneapolis General Hospital. In 1945, she became an American citizen and moved to Los Angeles, California, as chief psychologist at the Los Angeles County Hospital. She held this position until her retirement in 1958; during that time she also served as a professor of Psychiatry at the University of Southern California. After her retirement she went into private practice in Beverly Hills, California.

== Work ==
- In 1922 in Dresden, she published Das Seelenleben des Jugendlichen ("The mental life of young people"), in which, for the first time, a developmental perspective was used in adolescent psychology. "Bühler's world test" is a projective test method developed by Charlotte Bühler.
- In Vienna, specializing in infant and adolescent psychology, Bühler established a focus on experimental research based on diaries and behavioral observations (the "Vienna School"). With her assistant Hildegard Hetzer, who was succeeded in 1927 by Lotte Schenk-Danzinger, she developed intelligence assessment tests for children which are used to this day.
- In 1933, her work on Der menschliche Lebenslauf als psychologisches Problem ("The course of human life as a psychological problem") was the first German-language study to include old age among the psychological age spans and to consider gerontopsychology a part of psychology. She is therefore considered an early pioneer in the field of gerontopsychology.
- In the United States, she came up with four "basic tendencies" of humans: gratification, self-restricting accommodation, creative expansion, and maintaining internal order. Other ways of expressing these tendencies are: drive for personal satisfaction, adjustment for the purpose of obtaining security, creativity or self-expression, and need for order. She laid the foundations of humanistic psychology together with Carl Rogers and Abraham Maslow.

== Honors ==
- The Charlotte-Bühler-Institut für praxisorientierte Kleinkindforschung ("Charlotte Bühler Institute for practical research on infants"), established in 1992 in Vienna, is named after her.

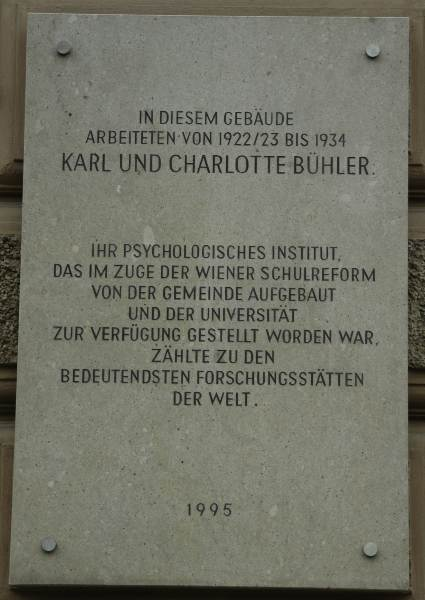
Plaque dedicated to Karl and Charlotte Bühler at the Palais Epstein, Vienna

- A plaque in honor of Charlotte and Karl Bühler was unveiled in 1995 at the Palais Epstein in Vienna.
- Dresden and Emsdetten have Charlotte Bühler roads and Vienna has a Charlotte Bühler way.

== Publications ==
Her list of publications includes 168 works, several of which have been translated into 21 languages.

- Das Märchen und die Phantasie des Kindes ("The fairy tale and the imagination of the child"). Barth, Leipzig 1918.
- Das Seelenleben des Jugendlichen : Versuch einer Analyse und Theorie der psychischen Pubertät (The inner life of the adolescent: An attempt at analysis and theory of mental puberty"). G. Fischer, Jena 1922.
- Kindheit und Jugend : Genese des Bewußtseins ("Childhood and adolescence: Origins of consciousness"). Hirzel, Leipzig 1928.
- Der menschliche Lebenslauf als psychologisches Problem ("The course of human life as a psychological problem"). Hirzel, Leipzig 1933.
- Praktische Kinderpsychologie ("Practical child psychology"). Lorenz, Vienna, Leipzig [1938].
- Kind und Familie : Untersuchungen der Wechselbeziehungen des Kindes mit seiner Familie ("Child and family: Studies on the interactions of the child with his family"). Fischer, Jena 1937.
- Kleinkindertests : Entwicklungstests vom 1. bis 6. Lebensjahr ("Infant testing: Developmental testing from 1 up to 6 years of age"). Barth, Munich 1952.
- Psychologie im Leben unserer Zeit ("Psychology in the life of our times") Droemer/Knaur, Munich, Zurich 1962.
