= Susumu Kuno =

Japanese linguist and author (born 1933)

- Born: August 11, 1933 (age 92); Tokyo, Japan
- Other name: 久野 暲
- Education: Tokyo University
- Occupation: Linguist
- Employer: Harvard University

Susumu Kuno (久野 暲, Kuno Susumu; born August 11, 1933) is a Japanese linguist and author. He is Professor Emeritus of Linguistics at Harvard University, where he received his Ph.D. degree in 1964 and spent his entire career.

== Early life ==
Kuno received his A.B. and A.M. from Tokyo University where he received a thorough grounding in linguistics under the guidance of Shirō Hattori. His postgraduate research focused on the Dravidian languages. It was through S.-Y. Kuroda, an early advocate of Chomskyan approaches to language, that Kuno undertook his first studies in transformational grammar. In 1960 he went to Harvard to work on a machine translation project.

== Research approach ==
Kuno is known for his discourse-functionalist approach to syntax known as functional sentence perspective and for his analysis of the syntax of Japanese verbs and particularly the semantic and grammatical characteristics of stativity and the semantic correlates of case marking and constraints on scrambling. However, his interests are broader. In the preface to the second of a pair of festschrifts for Kuno, its editors describe these interests as "[extending] not only to syntax, semantics, and pragmatics, but also to computational linguistics and other fields such as discourse study and the processing of kanji, Chinese characters used in Japan".

== The Structure of the Japanese Language ==
Kuno's most widely read book is his innovative study, The Structure of the Japanese Language, which set out to tackle what nearly all previous grammars of that language had either failed to adequately explain or wholly ignored. The issues he analyses here are a small restricted group of features of the language overall, but of crucial importance for mastery of Japanese, features which 'make Japanese Japanese' and mark it out from other languages, including those, especially, which share the basic SOV structure of that language. The Subject-Object-Verb word order is a pattern he associates with 4 notable features characteristic of Japanese grammar, namely:-

(1) Its postpositional, as opposed to prepositional features.
(2) Its left-branching feature in syntactic analysis.
(3) Its backward working phrase deletion pattern.
(4) Its freedom from constraints to place interrogative words in sentence-initial position.

Using the insights of transformational grammar, Kuno sketches out what standard grammars do not tell their readers, i.e., when otherwise normal grammatical patterns can not be used. In this sense, the work constituted an innovative 'grammar of ungrammatical sentences'.

== Bibliography ==
Kuno's second festschrift contains a fuller bibliography, listing six authored or coauthored books, 17 edited or coedited books and working papers, a book translation, and 120 authored or coauthored papers.

- Kuno, Susumu (1966) The augmented predictive analyzer for context-free languages - its relative efficiency. Commun. ACM 9(11): 810-823.
- Kuno, Susumu, Anthony G. Oettinger (1968) Computational linguistics in a Ph.D. computer science program. Commun. ACM 11(12): 831-836
- Hayashi, Hideyuki, Sheila Duncan, Susumu Kuno (1968) Computational Linguistics: Graphical input/output of nonstandard characters. Commun. ACM 11(9): 613-618
- Kuno, Susumu, et al. (1968) Mathematical Linguistics and Automatic Translation. Cambridge, Mass.: The Aiken Computation Laboratory, Harvard University.
- Kuno, Susumu. (1973). The structure of the Japanese language. Cambridge, MA: MIT Press. ISBN 0-262-11049-0.
- Kuno Susumu (1973) Nihon bunpõ kenkyũ (日本文法研究). Tokyo: Taishũkan.
- Kuno, Susumu. (1976). Subject, theme, and the speaker's empathy: A re-examination of relativization phenomena. In Charles N. Li (ed.), Subject and topic (pp. 417–444). New York: Academic Press. ISBN 0-12-447350-4.
- Kuno Susumu (1978) Danwa no bunpõ (談話の文法). Tokyo: Taishũkan.
- Kuno Susumu (1983) Shin Nihon bunpõ kenkyũ (新日本文法研究). Tokyo: Taishũkan.
- Kuno, Susumu (1987) Functional Syntax: Anaphora, Discourse, and Empathy. Chicago: University of Chicago Press. ISBN 0-226-46200-5 (hard); ISBN 0-226-46201-3 (paper).
- Kuno, Susumu, and Ken-ichi Takami (1993) Grammar and Discourse Principles: Functional Syntax and GB Theory. Chicago: University of Chicago Press. ISBN 0-226-46202-1 (hard); ISBN 0-226-46204-8 (paper).
- Kuno, Susumu, and Ken-ichi Takami. Quantifier Scope. Tokyo: Kurosio, 2002. ISBN 4-87424-248-0
- Kuno, Susumu, et al. (2004) Studies in Korean Syntax and Semantics. Seoul: International Circle of Korean Linguistics. ISBN 89-7878-766-5.
- Kuno, Susumu and Ken-ichi Takami. (2004) Functional constraints in grammar on the unergative-unaccusative distinction. Amsterdam and Philadelphia: John Benjamins. ISBN 90-272-1821-8 or ISBN 1-58811-555-0. Google Books.
- Kuno, Susumu and Takami Ken'ichi (高見健一). Bun no imi (文の意味). Tokyo: Kurosio, 2005. ISBN 4-87424-323-1.
- Kuno, Susumu et al. (2006). Nihongo kinoteki kobun kenkyu. Tokyo: Taishukanshoten

== Festschrifts ==
- Function and Structure: In Honor of Susumu Kuno, ed. Akio Kamio and Ken-ichi Takami. Amsterdam and Philadelphia: John Benjamins, 1999. ISBN 90-272-5073-1 and ISBN 1-55619-822-1.
- Syntactic and Functional Explorations: In Honor of Susumu Kuno, ed. Ken-ichi Takami, Akio Kamio, and John Whitman. Tokyo: Kurosio, 2000. ISBN 4-87424-197-2.
