= Topic-prominent language =

Language emphasizing topic–comment structure

A topic-prominent language is a language that organizes its syntax to emphasize the topic–comment structure of the sentence. The term is best known in American linguistics from Charles N. Li and Sandra Thompson, who distinguished topic-prominent languages, such as Korean and Japanese, from subject-prominent languages, such as English.

In Li and Thompson's (1976) view, topic-prominent languages have morphology or syntax that highlights the distinction between the topic and the comment (what is said about the topic). Topic–comment structure may be independent of the syntactic ordering of subject, verb and object.

== Common features ==
Many topic-prominent languages share several syntactic features that have arisen because the languages have sentences that are structured around topics, rather than subjects and objects:

- They tend to downplay the role of the passive voice, if a passive construction exists at all,This statement seems incorrect for Japanese: Japanese makes extensive use of the passive, even in technical writing. since the main idea of passivization is to turn an object into a subject in languages whose subject is understood to be the topic by default.
- They rarely have expletives or "dummy subjects" (pleonastic pronouns) like English it in It's raining.
- They often have sentences with so-called "double subjects", actually a topic plus a subject. For example, the following sentence patterns are common in topic-prominent languages:

Mandarin	這個 人 個子 很 高。 这个 人 个子 很 高。 zhège rén gèzi hěn gāo "This person (topic) height (subject) very tall."
Japanese	その ヤシは 葉っぱが 大きい。 sono yashi-wa happa-ga ookii "That palm tree (topic) leaves (subject) are big."

- They do not have articles, which are another way of indicating old vs. new information.
- The distinction between subject and object is not reliably marked.This also seems incorrect for Japanese: the subject is marked with the particle が (ga) (when the subject is separate from the topic, marked with は (wa)), and the object is marked with を (o).Hungarian also seems to be an outlier in this regard, consistently distinguishing between agent and patient via use of its noun cases (e.g. nominative "alma" vs accusative "almát").

Lisu, a Lolo–Burmese language, has been described as highly topic-prominent, and Sara Rosen has demonstrated that "while every clause has an identifiable topic, it is often impossible to distinguish subject from direct object or agent from patient. There are no diagnostics that reliably identify subjects (or objects) in Lisu." The ambiguity is demonstrated in the following example:

làthyu nya ánà khù -a
people TOP dog bite -DECL
a. "People, they bite dogs."
b. "People, dogs bite them."

== Examples ==
Examples of topic-prominent languages include East Asian languages such as Chinese, Japanese, Korean, Vietnamese, Malay, Indonesian, Singaporean English and Malaysian English. Also, Turkish, Hungarian, Somali, and Native American languages like the Siouan languages are topic-prominent. Modern linguistic studies have shown that Brazilian Portuguese is a topic-prominent or topic- and subject-prominent language (see Brazilian Portuguese#Topic-prominent language). American Sign Language is also considered to be topic-prominent.

=== Mandarin Chinese ===
張三 我 已經 見過 了。
{Zhāng Sān} wǒ yǐjing jiàn-guò le
{Zhang San} I already see-EXP RES
(As for) Zhang San, I've seen (him) already.

我 已經 見過 張三 了。
wǒ yǐjing jiàn-guò {Zhāng Sān} le
I already see-EXP {Zhang San} RES
I've already seen Zhang San.

*Remark: Mandarin Chinese sentences are predominantly SVO, but the language allows the object to be promoted to the topic of the sentence, which results in an apparently OSV word order.

=== Japanese ===
魚は 鯛が おいしい。
sakana-wa tai-ga oishi-i
fish-TOP red.snapper-NOM delicious-NPST
When it comes to fish, red snapper is delicious. / Red snapper is a delicious fish.

=== Lakota ===
Miye ṡuŋkawaḱaŋ eya owiċabluspe yelo.
be-the-one-1SG horse DET.PL catch-3PL.UND-1SG.ACT-catch DECL.male
(As for) me, some horses: I caught them. → It was me who caught some horses. (I caught some horses.)

=== Turkish ===
Seni yarın yine göreceğim.
you-ACC tomorrow again see-FUT-1SG
You tomorrow again I'll see. → I'll see you again tomorrow.

=== American Sign Language ===
In American Sign Language (ASL), the topic of the sentence is at its beginning. For example, in translating the English phrase "We are going to the store tomorrow", here are some possible ASL sentences, literally translated:

- "WE GO STORE TOMORROW."
- "TOMORROW, STORE WE GO." (TOMORROW is the topic)
- "*STORE, WE GO TOMORROW." (STORE is the topic)

Proper ASL structure, however, uses the time indicator first and so the proper ASL form would be the second one: "TOMORROW, STORE WE GO."

== See also ==
- Topic marker
- Topic–comment
