= On Linguistic Aspects of Translation =

1959 essay written by Roman Jakobson

On Linguistic Aspects of Translation is an essay written by Russian-American linguist Roman Jakobson in 1959. It was published in On Translation, a compendium of seventeen papers edited by Reuben Arthur Brower. On Translation discusses various aspects of translation and was published in Cambridge, Massachusetts.

In his essay, Jakobson states that meaning of a word is a linguistic phenomenon. Using semiotics, Jakobson believes that meaning lays with the signifier and not in the signified. Thus it is the linguistic verbal sign that gives an object its meaning. Interpretation of a verbal sign according to Roman Jakobson can happen in three ways: intralingual, interlingual and intersemiotic. In the case of intralingual translation, the changes take place within the same language. Thus a verbal sign (word) belonging to a particular language is replaced by another sign (word) belonging to the same language. Interlingual translation on the other hand can be seen as replacing a verbal sign with another sign but belonging to a different language.

The last kind of explanation of verbal sign that he talks about is the intersemiotic translation. Here more than focusing on the words, emphasis is on the overall message that needs to be conveyed. Thus the translator, instead of paying attention to the verbal signs, concentrates more on the information that is to be delivered. Roman Jakobson uses the term ‘mutual translatability’ and states that when any two languages are being compared, the foremost thing that needs to be taken into consideration is whether they can be translated into one another or not. Laying emphasis on the grammar of a particular language, he feels that it should determine how one language is different from another.

In the essay, Roman Jakobson also deals with the problem of ‘deficiency’ in a particular language. Jakobson believes that all cognitive experiences can be expressed in language and while translating whenever there is a lack or ‘deficiency’ of words’, ‘loan words’, ‘neologisms’ and ‘circumlocutions’ can be used to fill in this lack.

Reinforcing the fact that one of the factors that translation has to take care of is the grammatical structure of the target language, Jakobson believes that it becomes tedious to try to maintain fidelity to the source text when the target language has a rigid grammatical framework which is missing in the source language. Jakobson, in his essay also brings in the relationship between gender and the grammar of a particular language.
