= Yokoyama Station =

Yokoyama Station may refer to either of the following train stations in Japan:

- Yokoyama Station (Hyōgo) of Kobe Electric Railway
- Yokoyama Station (Ishikawa) of JR West
- Shima-Yokoyama Station of Kintetsu
- Rikuzen-Yokoyama Station of JR East
