= Pavel Tichý =

Czech logician, philosopher and mathematician

Pavel Tichý (Czech: [ˈpavɛl ˈcɪxiː]; 18 February 1936, Brno, Czechoslovakia – 26 October 1994, Dunedin, New Zealand) was a Czech logician, philosopher and mathematician.

He worked in the field of intensional logic and founded transparent intensional logic, an original theory of the logical analysis of natural languages – the theory is devoted to the problem of saying exactly what it is that we learn, know and can communicate when we come to understand what a sentence means. He spent roughly 25 years working on it. His main work is a book The Foundations of Frege's Logic, published by Walter de Gruyter in 1988.

== Biography ==
Tichý was born in Brno in 1936. His father was an insurance clerk. His family lived in Zlín until 1948 when they moved to Vsetín. At school he was already a brilliant student. He also liked playing music of Jaroslav Ježek on the piano. After finishing studies in Vsetín he moved to Prague followed by his parents. Tichý graduated in 1959 at Charles University in Prague. He stayed there tutoring as an assistant from 1961 to 1968 at the department of Logic in the Faculty of Philosophy. One of his other hobbies was carpentry. He was said to be a perfectionist in everything he did, whether he was learning a foreign language or making a table.

In 1968 he received an invitation from Exeter University in the United Kingdom. He was permitted to leave the country even though it was shortly after Soviet troops invaded Czechoslovakia in the Prague Spring. He decided not to return. In 1970 he emigrated with his family to New Zealand, by ship. He started teaching at the University of Otago in Dunedin, New Zealand where he became Professor of Philosophy at Otago in 1981. Tichý stayed teaching there until his death. He is remembered as a ferocious debater who liked to express his views directly regardless of any bad implications it could have. This made him a lot of friends but also a lot of enemies.

Four years after the Velvet Revolution, in 1993, Tichý was offered the position of Head of the Department of Logic at the Faculty of Philosophy and Arts of Charles University in Prague. He died before taking up this position.

=== Timeline ===
- PhDr. (Charles University, 1959), thesis: Výklad Gödelovy věty o neúplnosti v prosté teorii typů [An Exposition of Gödel's Incompleteness Theorem in the Simple Theory of Types]
- Candidate of Sciences (Charles University, 1964), thesis: Vyčíslitelnost ve vztahu k teoriím [On Computability w.r.t. Theories]
- Docent (Charles University, 1969), thesis: Intensions in Terms of Turing Machines and On the Vicious Circle in Definitions: Two Studies in Logical Semantics
- PhD (Exeter University, 1971), thesis: Contributions to the Theory of Postulate Systems
- Associate Professor, University of Otago, 1978
- Professor, University of Otago, 1981

== Books ==
- P. Tichý (1988): The Foundations of Frege's Logic. De Gruyter, Berlin and New York 1988, 333 pp., ISBN 3-11-011668-5
- V. Svoboda, B. Jespersen, C. Cheyne (Eds.) (2004): Pavel Tichý's Collected Papers in Logic and Philosophy. Filosofia, Prague and Otago University Press, Dunedin, 901 pp., ISBN 1-877276-98-7
