= Friedemann Schulz von Thun =

German psychologist

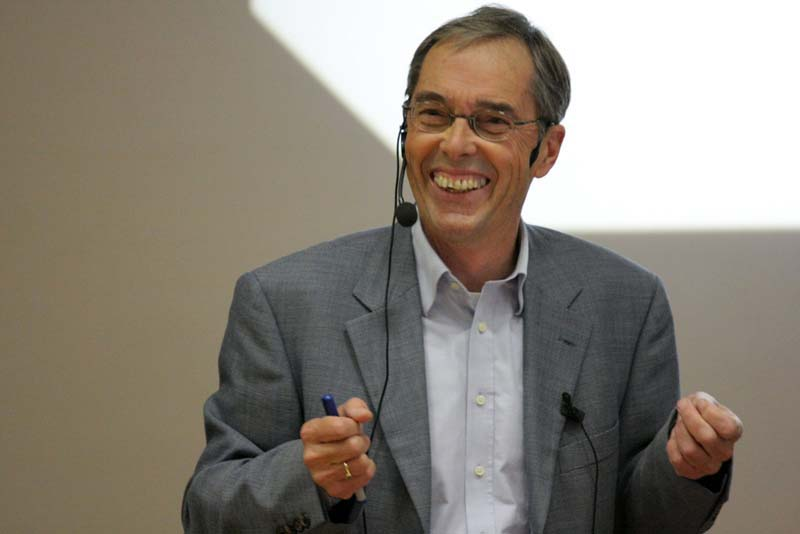
Friedemann Schulz von Thun (2014)

Friedemann Schulz von Thun (born August 6, 1944 in Soltau) is a German psychologist and expert in inter- and intrapersonal communication. Schulz von Thun worked as a professor of psychology at the University of Hamburg until his retirement on 30 September 2009. Among his various publications is a three-part book series titled "Miteinander Reden" (Talking With Each Other) which has become a standard textbook series in Germany and is widely taught in schools, universities, and vocational skills training. Schulz von Thun developed a number of comprehensive theoretical models to help people understand the determinants and processes of interpersonal exchange and their embeddedness in the individual inner states and the outward situation. He invented the four sides model and developed the inner team model and a visualization of the value square.

== Publications ==
- 1981, Miteinander reden 1 – Störungen und Klärungen. Allgemeine Psychologie der Kommunikation. Rowohlt, Reinbek, ISBN 3-499-17489-8
- 1989, Miteinander reden 2 – Stile, Werte und Persönlichkeitsentwicklung. Differentielle Psychologie der Kommunikation. Rowohlt, Reinbek, ISBN 3-499-18496-6
- 1998, Miteinander reden 3 – Das „innere Team“ und situationsgerechte Kommunikation. Rowohlt, Reinbek, ISBN 3-499-60545-7
- 2004, Klarkommen mit sich selbst und anderen: Kommunikation und soziale Kompetenz. Reden, Aufsätze, Dialoge. Rowohlt, Reinbek, ISBN 3-499-61924-5

As editor

- 2000/2003, with Johannes Ruppel, Roswitha Stratmann: Miteinander reden: Kommunikation für Führungskräfte. Rowohlt, Reinbek, ISBN 3-499-61531-2
- 2004, with Wibke Stegemann: Das Innere Team in Aktion. Praktische Arbeit mit dem Modell. Rowohlt, Reinbek 2004, ISBN 3-499-61644-0
