= Ken Yokoyama =

Ken Yokoyama may refer to:

- Ken Yokoyama (横山健), member of the punk bands Hi-Standard and BBQ Chickens, founder of the punk record label, Pizza of Death Records
- Ken Yokoyama (横山剣), member of the funk and pop Crazy Ken Band
