= Transparent intensional logic =

Transparent intensional logic (frequently abbreviated as TIL) is a logical system created by Pavel Tichý. Due to its rich procedural semantics TIL is in particular apt for the logical analysis of natural language. From the formal point of view, TIL is a hyperintensional, partial, typed lambda calculus.

TIL applications cover a wide range of topics from formal semantics, philosophy of language, epistemic logic, philosophical, and formal logic. TIL provides an overarching semantic framework for all sorts of discourse, whether colloquial, scientific, mathematical or logical. The semantic theory is a procedural one, according to which sense is an abstract, pre-linguistic procedure detailing what operations to apply to what procedural constituents to arrive at the product (if any) of the procedure.

TIL procedures, known as constructions, are hyperintensionally individuated. Construction is the single most important notion of transparent intensional logic, being a philosophically well-motivated and formally worked-out conception of Frege’s notion of mode of presentation. Constructions, and the entities they construct, are organized into a ramified type theory incorporating a simple type theory. The semantics is tailored to the hardest case, as constituted by hyperintensional contexts, and generalized from there to intensional and extensional contexts. The underlying logic is a Frege-style function/argument one, treating functions, rather than relations or sets, as primitive, together with a Church-style logic, centred on the operations of functional abstraction and application.

Key constraints informing the TIL approach to semantic analysis are compositionality and anti-contextualism. The assignment of constructions to expressions as their meanings is context-invariant. Depending on the sort of logical context in which a construction occurs, what is context-dependent is the logical manipulation of the respective meaning itself rather than the meaning assignment.

== See also ==
- Intensional logic

== Bibliography ==
- P. Tichý (1988): The Foundations of Frege's Logic. De Gruyter, Berlin and New York 1988, 333 pp.
- M. Duží, B. Jespersen and P. Materna: Procedural Semantics for Hyperintensional Logic. Foundations and Applications of TIL. Springer, 2010.
