= Shomatsu Yokoyama =

Japanese physician

- Born: 1913
- Died: 1992 (aged 78–79)
- Known for: refused to conduct medical experiments on humans
- Scientific career
- Fields: physicians

Shomatsu Yokoyama (横山 正松, Yokoyama Shōmatsu; 1913–1992) was a Japanese physician. During the Second World War, he disobeyed orders to conduct inhumane experiments on living human beings.
