= Bohumil Mathesius =

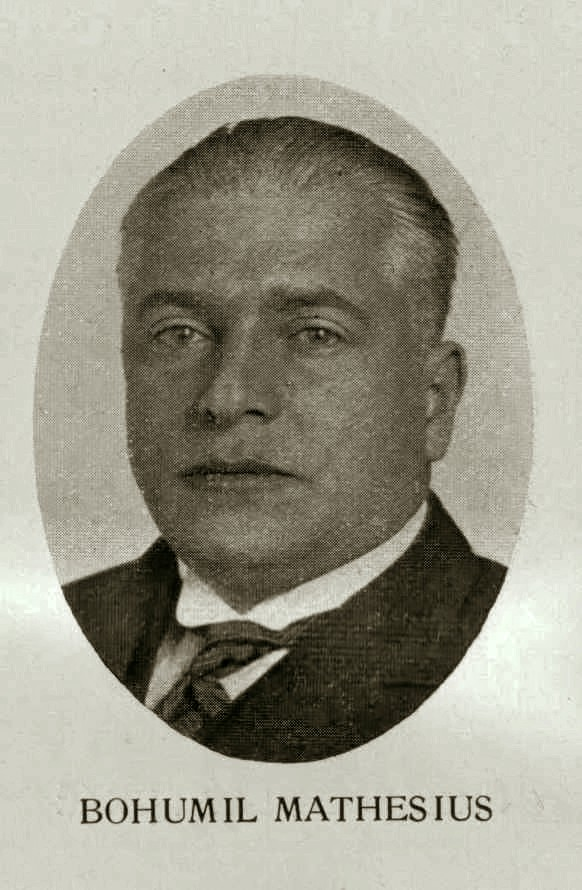
Mathesius Bohumil (1888-1952)

Bohumil Mathesius (July 14, 1888 in Prague – June 2, 1952) was a Czech poet, translator, publicist and literary scientist – expert on Russian literature. He was a professor at the Faculty of Arts of the Charles University in Prague. His cousin was Vilém Mathesius.

Bohumil Mathesius enriched the tradition of herald poetry by paraphrases of Chinese poetry: Zpěvy staré Číny (Songs of old China), Nové zpěvy staré Číny (New songs of old China), and Třetí zpěvy staré Číny (A third book of songs of old China). His very particular translating made available to the Czech literature works of Russian authors (Aleksandr Pushkin, Mikhail Lermontov, Nikolai Gogol, Fyodor Dostoyevsky, Leo Tolstoy, Vladimir Mayakovsky, Sergei Yesenin, Michail Aleksandrovich Sholokhov). He also translated from German, French and Norwegian literatures, notable among the last being Henrik Ibsen's Peer Gynt.
