= Organon model =

Model of communication by Karl Bühler

The organon model

The organon model (German: Organon-Modell) is a model of communication by German psychologist and linguist Karl Ludwig Bühler (1879–1963). It was published in German in 1934 and not translated into English until 1990. In it he defined the functions of communication according to which linguistic communication can be described. Bühler's work influenced the communication model of Roman Jakobson.

Buhler's model also apparently influenced Lev Vygotsky who, in discussing memory and goal-directed learning, wrote: "According to K. Buhler, speech thinks for us."

Bühler identified the following three communicative functions:

- the expressive function (Ausdrucksfunktion)
- the representation function (Darstellungsfunktion)
- the conative function (Appellfunktion, i.e. appealing function).

== Background ==
Karl Bühler used the Cratylus of Plato as the basis for his remarks. Here, Socrates refers to the word as an Ancient Greek: ὄργανον, romanized: órganon, lit. 'instrument, tool, organ', and thus to language as a whole as a tool, with which a person can communicate something to others about things. Bühler described this relationship as a 'three-foundations scheme': oneself – to the other – about things (einer – dem anderen – über die Dinge).

Bühler's organon model criticized the material thinking of behaviorism, which according to him had renewed the "flatus-vocis nominalism of the incipient Middle Ages in modern form."

== As a semiotic model ==
Hartmut Stöckl described the Organon model as a semiotic model, comparing it to Aristotle's triad of pathos, logos, and ethos. He wrote:

[Bühler’s] model acknowledges “the essential rhetorical fact that any sign use must in effect express the ethos of the rhetor, represent their rational take on the world (logos) and appeal to the emotional mindset of an envisaged audience (pathos).”

— Stöckl, Tracing the shapes of multimodal rhetoric

The model has been compared to Kress's semiotic model.
