= Vilém Mathesius =

Czech linguist, literature historian and science writer

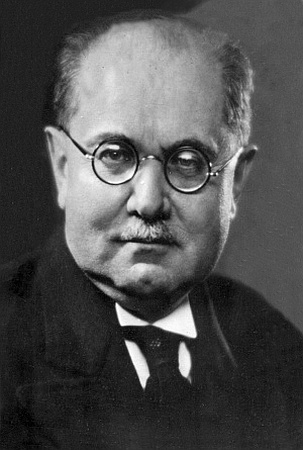
- Vilém Mathesius
- Born: 3 August 1882; Pardubice, Austria-Hungary
- Died: 12 April 1945 (aged 62); Prague, Protectorate of Bohemia and Moravia
- Occupation: Professor
- Known for: Prague Linguistic Circle

Academic background
- Education: Charles University
- Influences: Henry Sweet, Otto Jespersen, Georg von der Gabelentz, T.G. Masaryk

Academic work
- Discipline: Linguist
- Sub-discipline: Functionalism
- Influenced: Bohumil Trnka, Vladimir Skalička, Jan Firbas, Petr Sgall

Vilém Mathesius (Czech pronunciation: [ˈvɪlɛːm ˈmatɛːzɪjus], 3 August 1882 – 12 April 1945) was a Czech linguist, literary historian and co-founder of the Prague Linguistic Circle. He is considered one of the founders of structural functionalism in linguistics.

Mathesius was the editor-in-chief of two linguistic journals, Travaux du Cercle Linguistique de Prague (“Works of the Prague Linguistic Circle”) and Slovo a slovesnost ("Word and Verbal Art"), and the co-founder of a third, Nové Athenaeum. His extensive publications in these journals and elsewhere cover a range of topics, including the history of English literature, syntax, Czech stylistics, and cultural activism.

In addition to his work in linguistics, in 1912 he founded the department of English philology at Charles University, which was the first such department in Czech lands. He remained head of the department until 1939, when the Nazis closed all Czech universities. The department now exists as a branch of the Faculty of Arts, but it is called the "Department of Anglophone Literatures and Cultures."

== Personal life and education ==
Vilém was born as the youngest of two sons of Bedřich and Evelina Mathesius. His father was a wealthy tanner in a long line of tanners of Saxon origin, claiming Martin Luther's biographer Johannes Mathesius as an ancestor. His cousin, Bohumil Mathesius, was a poet and translator.

Vilém was born in Pardubice in Eastern Bohemia in Austria-Hungary (now the Czech Republic). When he was 11, his family moved west to Kolín. There he attended a classic gymnasium and took particular interest in the study of language, taking classes in Latin, Greek, German, and French, in addition to his native language of Czech. He also taught himself some Italian and Russian, and met with the pastor Čeněk Dušek for private lessons in English. Dušek also instructed Mathesius in Calvinism, the religion which Mathesius actively and devotedly practiced his whole life.

In 1901, Mathesius began his studies of Germanic and Romance philology under the Neogrammarian Jan Gebauer at Charles University in Prague, earning both his B.A. and his PhD there. The topic of his doctoral dissertation, which he submitted in 1907, was Hippolyte Taine's criticism of Shakespeare. While serving as an assistant teacher of German at a secondary school in Plzeň, he wrote his habilitation thesis and submitted it in 1909. He spent the next 3 years working at Charles University as a privatdozent, then in 1912 he was appointed the university's first professor of Anglistics (English philology), effectively founding the department. He remained head of the department until Charles University, along with all other Czech universities, was forcibly shut down by the Nazis on November 17, 1939.

In 1908 Mathesius married Růžena Moravcová with whom he later had a son, Vilém (known as Vilík). Moravcová died unexpectedly in 1933 during a routine operation. Soon after, Mathesius married her sister, Antonia.

Mathesius suffered a number of health problems during his lifetime. In 1922 he contracted an eye disease that eventually left him completely blind. This caused him to rely increasingly on his students, including René Wellek and Bohumil Trnka, to assist him in his teaching, reading, and writing. Ten years later, in 1932, he was diagnosed with tuberculosis of the vertebrae, which caused him to be bed-ridden for a year and a half (1932–33). In spite of these ailments, he continued to pursue his studies, teach his classes, and work with the Prague Circle, until his death in Prague on 12 April 1945.

== Work with the Prague Circle ==
Mathesius first met Roman Jakobson, an influential Russian linguist and co-founder of the Moscow Linguistic Circle, soon after Jakobson's arrival in Prague in 1920. It was Jakobson who pointed out the need for a center for work and discussion for young linguists in the city, which coincided with Mathesius's patriotic desire to improve the state of scholarship in Czechoslovakia. However, their plans would not be realized for half a decade.

For a year and a half (March 1925 – October 1926), Mathesius hosted the sporadic and informal gatherings of young linguists that eventually became the Prague Linguistic Circle at his own house. The first official meeting took place on October 6, 1926, at Mathesius's office. Henrik Becker, a young German linguist, was the first speaker invited to give a lecture, which was attended by five people (including Mathesius and Jakobson) and followed by a discussion. The Circle applied for official status in 1930, and Mathesius, as a senior member and well-established academic, served as its president.

The Circle achieved international notice at two linguistic conferences: the First International Congress of Linguists at the Hague in 1928, then the First International Congress of Slavists in Prague in 1929. They used these conferences as an opportunity to develop and present a set of ten theses for linguistic research, promoting a "functionalist" approach to the study of language. Soon after the Prague Congress they issued their first independent publication, two volumes of the journal Travaux du Cercle Linguistique de Prague ("Works of the Prague Linguistic Circle"), of which Mathesius was the editor-in-chief. In addition, in 1936 the Circle began issuing a Czech periodical called Slovo a slovesnost ("Word and verbal art"), also with Mathesius as editor-in-chief. Publication of Travaux ceased in 1939 due to the onset of World War II, but the journal began to be reissued in 1995 as part of a general effort to revive the Circle. Slovo a slovesnost, which specializes in structuralist theory and Czech language, now continues (after a brief hiatus from 1942 to 1947) to be published as a quarterly.

== Scholarship ==
Mathesius's scholarly work is typically divided into three periods based on his academic and intellectual focus and his increasing interest in linguistic concerns.

=== Literary History (1910–1926) ===
During the early stage of his career, Mathesius's interests were split between literary history and linguistics. He started to assemble a compendium of the history of English literature and managed to publish two volumes (1910–1915) before the loss of his eyesight cut his work short. These works, which cover the Anglo-Saxon period through the late Middle Ages, were foundational in establishing the Anglistics department at the university. He also wrote a number of articles on Shakespeare and his critics in 1916, the year of Shakespeare's Jubilee.

Alongside his work with literature, he began exploring linguistic theory and questioning the Neogrammarian emphasis on diachronic, or historical, linguistics that defined the study of language at his time. In 1911 he presented one of his more famous lectures to the Royal Learned Society, "On the potentiality of the phenomena of language", which anticipates Ferdinand de Saussure's critical distinction between langue and parole (1916) and emphasizes the importance of the synchronic (in his words, "static") study of language.

=== The Founding of the Circle (1926–1936) ===
In his second period of intellectual development, which coincided with the first decade of the Prague Linguistic Circle, Mathesius explored the nature of syntax and semantics and also contributed to the Circle's work on phonology, introducing the ideas of functional load and combining capacity of phonemes. This is also the point at which he began to develop his idea of functionalism in contrast to Saussurean structuralism.

=== Linguistic Functionalism (1936–1945) ===
The third and final period of Mathesius's work, which lasted until his death, was devoted to functionalist theories of grammar. He was a leading proponent of this school of thought, although he credits the followers of the Polish linguist Jan Baudouin de Courtenay and the Danish linguist Otto Jespersen with having sowed the seeds of the movement. Mathesius built up functionalism as an alternative to the approach of the Neogrammarians, which he criticized as failing to view language as a whole system, overly emphasizing written language at the expense of spoken, and neglecting the role of the speaker/writer in the production of language. Functionalism remedied these problems, and it also preferred synchronic study over diachronic and favored an analytic approach over a genealogical one.

During this time period, Mathesius also became more concerned with issues of stylistics, such as rhythm and intonation, in both Czech and English. The total loss of his eyesight caused him to focus his attention on these aspects of spoken language, because spoken language was now more easily accessible to him.

Throughout his scholarly career and particularly after the Nazi takeover of Czechoslovakia in 1939, Mathesius advocated for cultural activism, as defined by the first president of Czechoslovakia, T. G. Masaryk. In Mathesius's mind, cultural activism entailed the revitalization of the Czech national spirit and reform of national holidays, among other things. He published two major collections on the topic: Kulturní aktivismus ("Cultural Activism") in 1925, and Co daly naše země Evropě a lidstvu ("What Our Lands Contributed to Europe and Mankind") in 1940.

== Legacy ==
Mathesius's ideas on linguistic functionalism remained central to the work of the Prague Linguistic Circle and have been expanded upon by modern linguists in many directions. Linguistic approaches to information structure, including Functional Sentence Perspective and the topic-comment dichotomy, have grown out of Mathesius's writings through the work of Jan Firbas, František Daneš, Petr Sgall, and Eva Hajičová. Mathesius's ideas also influenced Michael Halliday's development of systemic functional grammar.

Critics maintain that Mathesius lacked refined methodology, and that his observations of data could not amount to much because of his reluctance to propose unified theories to account for them. His work never achieved the international renown of that of his colleagues, possibly because he wrote almost exclusively in Czech.

Mathesius's brainchild, the Prague Circle, did much to elevate and improve Prague's reputation in the academic world and bring it to international attention. Reflecting on the first ten years of the Circle, Mathesius summed up their contributions: "In foreign linguistics we fought for and won for our group the respectful title of the 'Prague School,' while at home, nobody can, without ill will, deny us the merit of having given many fresh impulses to Czech linguistic and literary research by our new standpoint and our new methods of work." Although the Circle dissolved in 1949 due to internal political tension, it was revived in 1989 and now works to publish journals, host conferences, and promote academic work in language and linguistics.

Mathesius is memorialized at Charles University by the Vilém Mathesius Centre for Research and Education in Semiotics and Linguistics and by the Vilém Mathesius Foundation for the Promotion of English and American Studies in Prague, which issues annual awards for the best MA and BA theses in the Department of English and American Studies.

== Main works ==
- O potenciálnosti jevů jazykových (On the Potentiality of the Phenomena of Language ), 1911, English trans. J. Vachek 1964.
- Dějiny literatury anglické I–II (The History of English Literature I–II), 1910–1915
- Kulturní aktivismus (Cultural activism), 1925
- On Linguistic Characterology with Illustrations from Modern English, 1928 [published in English].
- Co daly naše země Evropě a lidstvu (What our lands contributed to Europe and mankind), 1940
- Možnosti, které čekají (Possibilities that await), 1944
- Obsahový rozbor současné angličtiny na základě obečně lingvistickém (A functional analysis of present-day English on a general linguistic basis), 1961 (publ. posthumously)
- Jazyk, kultura a slovesnost (Language, culture and poetic art), 1982

== Citation ==
It is necessary to subject the language to such simplification that allows further work on it. (source: Vilém Mathesius: Jazyk, kultura a slovesnost (Language, culture and poetic art), 1982

== See also ==
- Prague Linguistic School
