= Jan Firbas =

Czech linguist

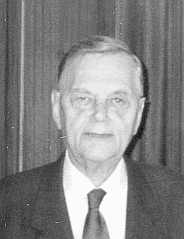
Prof. Jan Firbas, 1997

Jan Firbas (25 March 1921, Brno – 5 May 2000, Brno), was a Czech linguist and a prominent representative of the Prague School of linguistics.

== Biography ==
Born in Brno, in then Czechoslovakia, he studied English, German and philosophy at the Faculty of Arts of Masaryk University. From 1949 he was a member of the Department of English and American Studies of the faculty until his death in 2000. He became a member of the Prague Linguistics Circle, which was outlawed by the communist government. Persecution from the communist government and the fact that he came from an old Protestant family and refused to renounce his belief significantly delayed his academic career. Despite his international renown, it took him ten years to have his habilitation officially approved and he was only made Professor in 1990. In 1986, he was awarded Honorary Doctorates by the Universities of Leuven and Leeds, and in 2000 by the University of Turku. Even though he was frequently invited to give lecture series at universities across the globe in the 1970s and 80s, he could freely accept the invitations only after the fall of the communist regime in November 1989. Jan Firbas died on 5 May 2000 in Brno.

Firbas developed a theory of Information Structure called Functional Sentence Perspective (FSP), inspired by the work of Vilém Mathesius. It is Jan Firbas who is to be credited with the first use of the term Functional Sentence Perspective. He wrote more than 100 papers on the subject and published a comprehensive account of his approach to information structure of language as a monograph in 1992. Firbas's most diligent disciple was Aleš Svoboda, with whom he closely collaborated especially in the 1970s and 1980s on the development and refinement of the key concepts in the theory of Functional Sentence Perspective. The most important contribution of Jan Firbas to the study of information structure of language was to highlight the fact that "word-order is not the only means of FSP", thus in fact also correcting the view of Vilém Mathesius that "English is less susceptible to FSP than Czech" (ibid.). Firbas's further investigation of the means of FSP lead him to postulate a systemic view of FSP in which "context, linear modification, semantics and in the spoken language also intonation act as formative forces or factors" of FSP.

The work of Jan Firbas, covering not only the FSP theory but also other topics in linguistics, has been re-edited by his followers into five volumes of Collected Works of Jan Firbas (ISBN 978-80-210-5127-0). As of 25 March 2021, only the first three volumes have been published.

== See also ==
- Aleš Svoboda
- Functional sentence perspective
- Topic-comment
- Vilém Mathesius
