= Petr Sgall =

Czech linguist (1926–2019)

- Born: 27 May 1926; České Budějovice, Czechoslovakia (now Czech Republic)
- Died: 28 May 2019 (aged 93); Prague, Czech Republic
- Resting place: Olšany Cemetery (Prague, Czech Republic)
- Children: Jiří Sgall

Academic background
- Education: Charles University

Petr Sgall (27 May 1926 – 28 May 2019) was a Czech linguist. He specialized in dependency grammar, topic–focus articulation and Common Czech.

== Biography ==
Sgall was born on 27 May 1926 in České Budějovice. His father was an attorney and a translator from Litomyšl of Jewish descent. Sgall studied at Česká Třebová high school; however he was expelled in the 1942/43 academic year because of his Jewish father. Most of Sgall's closest relatives were killed in the Auschwitz concentration camp.

He studied Indo-European studies, comparative linguistics, general linguistics and Czech at Charles University in Prague.

His son is mathematician and computer scientist Jiří Sgall.
