= Karl Bühler =

German psychologist (1879–1963)

- Born: 27 May 1879; Meckesheim, Grand Duchy of Baden, German Empire
- Died: 24 October 1963 (aged 84); Los Angeles, California, U.S.
- Education: University of Freiburg; Technical University of Dresden; University of Vienna; University of Southern California
- Known for: Würzburg School; Gestalt psychology Organon model Deixis
- Spouse: Charlotte Bühler (née Malachowski) (m. 1916–1963) (his death)
- Scientific career
- Fields: Psychology
- Academic advisors: Oswald Külpe
- Doctoral students: Karl Popper

Karl Ludwig Bühler (German: [ˈbyːlɐ]; 27 May 1879 – 24 October 1963) was a German psychologist and linguist. In psychology he is known for his work in Gestalt psychology, and he was one of the founders of the Würzburg School of psychology. In linguistics he is known for his organon model of communication and his treatment of deixis as a linguistic phenomenon.

He was the dissertation advisor of Karl Popper.

== Early life and education ==
Bühler was born in Meckesheim, Baden. In 1899 he started medical school at the University of Freiburg, where he received his doctorate in 1903. He continued working as an assistant, and started taking a second degree in psychology graduating in 1904. In 1906 he worked as an assistant professor at the University of Freiburg with von Kries, and as an assistant to Oswald Külpe at the University of Würzburg.

== Career ==
In 1907 Bühler completed his Habilitation thesis at Würzburg, with the title Tatsachen und Probleme zu einer Psychologie der Denkvorgänge ("Facts and problems of the psychology of thought processes"). This text became foundational for the Würzburg School of psychology and sparked heated controversy with Wilhelm Wundt. In 1909 Bühler moved to the University of Bonn, becoming an assistant to Oswald Külpe.

From 1913 to 1918 Bühler worked as an associate professor in Munich. In World War I he performed military service as a doctor. In 1918, he was made a full professor of philosophy and education at the Technical University of Dresden.

In 1922, he became Professor of Psychology at the University of Vienna and the head of the Psychology Department. In the same year Moritz Schlick and Robert Reininger were also appointed as full professors; the latter would become president of the Philosophical Society of Vienna until its disbandment in 1938. Bühler participated in the founding of the Psychological Institute of Vienna as part of the city's efforts to reorganize the school system on the basis of new scientific findings about child psychology. He also worked in the field of the philosophy of language as a follower of the school of Franz Brentano, Alexius Meinong, Josef Klemens Kreibig and Alois Höfler. Bühler's wife, Charlotte Bühler, followed him and received a professorship in Vienna. Both taught at the University of Vienna until their common emigration.

On 23 March 1938, Bühler was briefly detained by the Nazis, which caused him to flee to London in 1940, then to Oslo. Finally he emigrated to the United States, where he worked from 1940 to 1945 as a professor in Minnesota and from 1945 to 1955 as a professor of psychiatry at the University of Southern California, Los Angeles.

In 1959 Karl Bühler was honored with the Wilhelm Wundt Medal of the German Society of Psychology.

== Personal life ==
During the war on April 4, 1916, he married Charlotte Malachowski, a student of Edmund Husserl. Their daughter Ingeborg was born in 1917, and their son Rolf in 1919. He died in Los Angeles.

== Work ==
- Bühler, Karl (1934). Sprachtheorie. Oxford, England: Fischer.
- Bühler, Karl (1934/1990). The Theory of Language: The Representational Function of Language (Sprachtheorie), p. 35. Translated by Donald Fraser Goodwin. Amsterdam: John Benjamin's Publishing Company. ISSN 0168-2555.
