= Topic and comment =

Terms describing information structure in linguistics

In linguistics, the topic, or theme, of a sentence is what is being talked about, and the comment (rheme or focus) is what is being said about the topic. This division into old vs. new content is called information structure. It is generally agreed that clauses are divided into topic vs. comment, but in certain cases, the boundary between them depends on the specific grammatical theory that is used to analyze the sentence.

The topic of a sentence is distinct from the grammatical subject. The topic is defined by pragmatic considerations, that is, the context that provides meaning. The grammatical subject is defined by syntax. In any given sentence the topic and grammatical subject may be the same, but they need not be. For example, in the sentence "As for the little girl, the dog bit her", the subject is "the dog", but the topic is "the little girl".

The topic is what is being talked about and the subject is the noun which the verb in the predicate agrees with. They may be distinct concepts from the concept agent (or actor), which is the "doer" and is defined by semantics: the contextual meaning of the sentence in the paragraph. In English clauses with a verb in the passive voice, for instance, the topic is typically the subject, and the agent may be omitted or follow the preposition by. For example, in the sentence "The little girl was bitten by the dog", "the little girl" is both the subject and the topic, but "the dog" is the agent.

In some languages, word order and other syntactic phenomena are determined largely by the topic–comment (theme–rheme) structure. Such languages are sometimes referred to as topic-prominent language. Korean and Japanese are often given as examples.

== Definitions and examples ==
The sentence- or clause-level "topic", or "theme", can be defined in a number of different ways. Among the most common are

- the phrase in a clause that the rest of the clause is understood to be about,
- a special position in a clause (often at the right or left-edge of the clause) where topics typically appear.

In an ordinary English clause, the subject is normally the same as the topic/theme (example 1) even in the passive voice, when the subject is a patient, not an agent as in example 2:

1. The dog bit the little girl.
2. The little girl was bitten by the dog.

Those clauses have different topics: the first is about the dog, and the second is about the little girl.

In English, it is possible to use other sentence structures to show the topic of the sentence such as these:

- As for the little girl, the dog bit her.
- It was the little girl that the dog bit.

The case of expletives is sometimes rather complex. Consider sentences with expletives (meaningless subjects), like:

- It is raining.
- There is some room in this house.
- There are two days in the year in which the day and the night are equal in length.

In those examples, the syntactic subject position (to the left of the verb) is manned by the meaningless expletive ("it" or "there"), whose sole purpose is satisfying the extended projection principle, and is nevertheless necessary. In those sentences, the topic is never the subject but is determined pragmatically. In all these cases, the whole sentence refers to the comment part.

The relation between topic (theme) and comment (rheme, focus) should not be confused with the topic–comment relation in the Rhetorical Structure Theory Discourse Treebank (RST-DT) corpus, where it is defined as "a general statement or topic of discussion is introduced, after which a specific remark is made on the statement or topic". For example: "[As far as the pound goes,] [some traders say a slide toward support at 1.5500 may be a favorable development for the dollar this week.]"

== Realization of topic–comment ==
Different languages mark topics in different ways. Distinct intonation and word-order are the most common means. The tendency to place topicalized constituents sentence-initially ("topic fronting") is widespread. Topic fronting refers to placing the topic at the beginning of a clause, regardless of whether or not it is marked. Again, linguists disagree on many details.

Languages often show different kinds of grammar between sentences that introduce new topics and those that continue discussing previously-established topics.

When a sentence continues discussing a previously-established topic, it is likely to use pronouns to refer to the topic. Such topics tend to be subjects. In many languages, pronouns referring to previously-established topics use pro-drop.

=== In English ===
In English, the topic, or theme, comes first in the clause and is typically marked out by intonation as well.

English sentences can have a topic-prominent formulation, instead of a subject-prominent formulation, when context makes it desirable. A typical pattern for doing so is opening with a class of prepositions such as as for, as regards, regarding, concerning, respecting, on, re, and others. Pedagogically or expositorily, that approach has value especially when speakers know that they need to lead the listener's attention from one topic to another in a deftly-efficient manner. They sometimes actively avoid misplacement of the focus of attention from moment to moment. However, topic-prominent languages might use that approach by default or obligatorily, but in subject-prominent ones such as English, it is merely an option, which often is not invoked.

=== In other languages ===
- In Japanese and Korean, the topic is usually marked with a postposition that serves as a topic marker, such as -wa (は) or 는/은, -(n)eun, respectively, which comes after the noun or phrase that is being topicalized.
- In Côte d'Ivoire French, the topic is marked by the postposition "là". The topic can be, but is not necessarily a noun or a nominal group, for example: « Voiture-là est jolie deh » ("That car is pretty"); « Aujourd'hui-là il fait chaud » ("It's hot on that day"); « Pour toi-là n'est pas comme pour moi hein » ("For you it's not the same as for me, huh"); and « Nous qui sommes ici-là, on attend ça seulement » ("We who are here, we are waiting for that only").
- So-called free word order languages such as Russian, Czech, and to some certain extent Chinese and German use word order as the primary means, and the topic usually precedes the focus. For example, in some Slavic languages such as Czech and Russian, both orders are possible. The order with the comment sentence-initial is referred to as subjective (Vilém Mathesius invented the term and opposed it to objective) and expresses certain emotional involvement. The two orders are distinguished by intonation.
- In Modern Hebrew, a topic may follow its comment in informal speech. For example, the syntactic subject of this sentence is an expletive זה ("ze", lit. "this"):

זה מענין מאד הספר הזה
ze meʿanyen meʾod, ha-sefer ha-ze
this interesting very, book this
"This book is very interesting."

- In American Sign Language, a topic can be declared at the beginning of a sentence (indicated by raised eyebrows and head tilt) describing the referent, and the rest of the sentence describes what happens to that referent.

== Practical applications ==
The main application of the topic-comment structure is in the domain of speech technology, especially the design of embodied conversational agents (intonational focus assignment, relation between information structure and posture and gesture). There were some attempts to apply the theory of topic/comment for information retrieval and automatic summarization.

== History ==
The distinction between subject and topic was probably first suggested by Henri Weil in 1844. He established the connection between information structure and word order. Georg von der Gabelentz distinguished psychological subject (roughly topic) and psychological object (roughly focus). In the Prague school, the dichotomy, termed topic–focus articulation, has been studied mainly by Vilém Mathesius, Jan Firbas, František Daneš, Petr Sgall and Eva Hajičová. They have been concerned mainly by its relation to intonation and word-order. Mathesius also pointed out that the topic does not provide new information but connects the sentence to the context. The work of Michael Halliday in the 1960s is responsible for developing linguistic science through his systemic functional linguistics model for English.

== See also ==
- Focus (linguistics)
- Predicate (grammar)
- Textual function (systemic functional linguistics)
- Thematic equative
- Topicalization
- Topic marker
- Topic-prominent language
