= List of phonologists =

The following is a list of some notable phonologists (scholars in the field of phonology).

- Diana Archangeli
- Álvaro Arias
- Jan Baudouin de Courtenay
- Eric Baković
- Hans Basbøll
- Mary Beckman
- Leonard Bloomfield
- Franz Boas
- Diane Brentari
- Catherine Browman
- Noam Chomsky
- George N. Clements
- Jennifer S. Cole
- Laura J. Downing
- John Rupert Firth
- John Goldsmith
- Mark Hale
- Morris Halle
- Bruce Hayes
- Joan B. Hooper
- Larry M. Hyman
- Sharon Inkelas
- Junko Itō
- Roman Jakobson
- Daniel Jones
- René Kager
- Ellen Kaisse
- Jonathan Kaye
- Michael Kenstowicz
- Paul Kiparsky
- Mikołaj Kruszewski
- Jerzy Kuryłowicz
- Aditi Lahiri
- André Martinet
- John McCarthy
- David Odden
- Marc van Oostendorp
- Janet Pierrehumbert
- Kenneth Pike
- Alan Prince
- Charles Reiss
- Keren Rice
- Jerzy Rubach
- Wendy Sandler
- Edward Sapir
- Ferdinand de Saussure
- Elisabeth Selkirk
- Sibawayh
- Paul Smolensky
- Donca Steriade
- Henry Sweet
- Nikolai Trubetzkoy
- Richard Wiese
- Moira Yip
- Elizabeth Zsiga
