= The Cambridge Handbook of Phonology =

- Author: Paul de Lacy (editor)
- Language: English
- Subject: phonology
- Publisher: Cambridge University Press
- Publication date: 2007
- Media type: Print (hardcover)
- Pages: 697
- ISBN: 0521848792

The Cambridge Handbook of Phonology is a 2007 book edited by Paul de Lacy in which the authors deal with different aspects of phonological research in the generative grammar. Michael Kenstowicz, Sabine Zerbian and Jennifer L. Smith have reviewed the book.

== Essays ==
  - Introduction: aims and content, Paul de Lacy
  - 1- Themes in phonology, Paul de Lacy
- Part I - Conceptual issues
  - 2 - The pursuit of theory, Alan Prince
  - 3 - Functionalism in phonology, Matthew Gordon
  - 4 - Markedness in phonology, Keren Rice
  - 5 - Derivations and levels of representation, John J. McCarthy
  - 6 - Representation, John Harris
  - 7- Contrast, Donca Steriade
- Part II - Prosody
  - 8 -The syllable, Draga Zec
  - 9 - Feet and metrical stress, René Kager
  - 10 - Tone, Moira Yip
  - 11 - Intonation, Carlos Gussenhoven
  - 12- The interaction of tone, sonority, and prosodic structure, Paul de Lacy
- Part III - Segmental phenomena
  - 13 - Segmental features, T. A. Hall
  - 14 - Local assimilation and constraint interaction, Eric Baković
  - 15 - Harmony, Diana Archangeli and Douglas Pulleyblank
  - 16 - Dissimilation in grammar and the lexicon, John D. Alderete and Stefan A. Frisch
- Part IV - Internal interfaces
  - 17 - The phonetics–phonology interface, John Kingston
  - 18 - The syntax–phonology interface, Hubert Truckenbrodt
  - 19 - Morpheme position, Adam Ussishkin
  - 20 - Reduplication, Suzanne Urbanczyk
- Part V - External interfaces
  - 21 - Diachronic phonology, Ricardo Bermúdez-Otero
  - 22 - Variation and optionality, Arto Anttila
  - 23 - Acquiring phonology, Paula Fikkert
  - 24 - Learnability, Bruce Tesar
  - 25 - Phonological impairment in children and adults, Barbara Bernhardt and Joseph Paul Stemberger
