= Linda Lombardi =

American linguist

Academic background
- Education: University of Massachusetts Amherst (PhD)
- Thesis: Laryngeal features and laryngeal neutralization (1991)
- Doctoral advisor: John McCarthy

Academic work
- Discipline: linguistics
- Sub-discipline: phonology
- Institutions: University of Maryland, College Park
- Website: http://www.lindalombardi.com/

Linda Lombardi is an American writer and editor specializing in animals. Lombardi worked as an academic linguist at the University of Maryland, College Park and was known for her works on phonology and optimality theory until she quit her tenured job to become an animal keeper.

== Books ==
=== Animals ===
- The Pit Bull Life, co-authored with Deirdre Franklin, Countryman Press 2016
- The Lemur's Cry, Wombatarama 2014
- The Sloth's Eye, Five Star Mysteries 2012
- Animals Behaving Badly: Boozing Bees, Cheating Chimps, Dogs with Guns, and Other Beastly True Tales, Penguin/Perigee 2011

=== Linguistics ===
- Laryngeal Features and Laryngeal Neutralization, Garland 1994 (Routledge 2018)
- Segmental Phonology in Optimality Theory, Cambridge University Press 2001
