= A Thematic Guide to Optimality Theory =

Book by John McCarthy

- Author: John McCarthy
- Language: English
- Subject: Optimality Theory
- Publisher: Cambridge University Press
- Publication date: 2001
- Media type: Print (hardcover)

A Thematic Guide to Optimality Theory is a 2001 book by John McCarthy in which the author provides a theoretical introduction to optimality theory, followed later with the practical guide Doing Optimality Theory by the same author.

== Reception ==
The book was reviewed by David Odden, Chiara Frigeni, Marina Tzakosta and Diana Archangeli.
