= Paul de Lacy =

Linguist

Academic background
- Education: University of Massachusetts Amherst (PhD)
- Thesis: The formal expression of markedness (2002)
- Doctoral advisor: John J. McCarthy
- Other advisors: Elisabeth O. Selkirk; John Kingston; Mark Feinstein; Alan S. Prince

Academic work
- Discipline: linguistics
- Sub-discipline: phonology

Paul de Lacy is a linguist and Professor Emeritus of Linguistics at Rutgers University. He is currently Honorary Associate Professor at the University of Auckland. He is known for his works on phonology.

== Books ==
- de Lacy, Paul (2006). Markedness: Reduction and Preservation in Phonology. Cambridge Studies in Linguistics 112. Cambridge University Press.
- de Lacy, Paul (ed.) (2007), The Cambridge Handbook of Phonology. Cambridge: Cambridge University Press.
