= Monik Charette =

French-Canadian linguist and phonologist

- Born: 29 May 1957 (age 69)
- Known for: Government phonology

Academic background
- Education: Université du Québec à Montréal (BA); McGill University (MA, (PhD)

Academic work
- Discipline: Linguist
- Sub-discipline: Phonology
- Institutions: SOAS University of London

Monik Charette (born 29 May 1957) is a French-Canadian linguist and phonologist who taught at SOAS the University of London, in the United Kingdom. She specializes in phonology, morphophonology, stress systems, vowel harmony, syllabic structure and word-structure, focusing on Altaic languages, Turkish, and French.

== Education and career ==
Charette earned her BA from Université du Québec à Montréal (UQAM), and her MA and PhD from McGill University, graduating in 1988. By 1989 she was working as a Training Fellow in Linguistics at the University of London School of Oriental and African Studies; by 1990 she was a lecturer in linguistics there, and later became a senior lecturer, teaching courses on phonology at undergraduate and postgraduate levels. She was also associate dean for postgraduate matters at the Faculty of Languages and Cultures.

Charette retired and moved back to Canada in 2019.

== Research ==
Charette is one of the founders and first proponents of Government Phonology, the phonological adaptation of Government and Binding Theory in syntax, with work done on vowel-zero alternation in French, on government-licensing, on headedness in element theory, on empty and pseudo-empty categories, on Turkish word-structure, among many others. Government Phonology she contributed the concepts of government-licensing and licensing constraints; in 1989 she was the first to propose a phonological version of the Minimality Condition.

With Aslı Göksel, Charette conducted research on licensing constraints (LC's); later research on LC's refers to their work as the "Charette-Göksel Hypothesis". Together with Jonathan Kaye, she led the research at SOAS, London, aimed at reducing the number of elements in Element Theory, concluding in the emergence of the so-called Revised Theory of Elements.

Charette's most cited work is her monograph from 1991, Conditions on Phonological Government, published by Cambridge University Press, which is the first extended study written within the framework of phonological government. In her analysis of French, she contributed to the general understanding of the relation between skeletal positions and higher prosodic structure in the form of her "pointless onsets" in h-aspiré words. She participated in the preparations of the festschrift for Jonathan Kaye, Living on the Edge, eventually edited by Stefan Ploch alone and published in 2003.

In 2001, Charette spoke at the Ninth Manchester Phonology Meeting in the session Phonology and syntax - the same or different?, where she presented the Government Phonology perspective. In 2009, she co-edited, with Peter K. Austin, Oliver Bond, David Nathan and Peter Sells, the volume Proceedings of Conference on Language Documentation and Linguistic Theory 2, London: SOAS. Her contributions to the understanding of the syllable in phonological theory, of Turkish vowel harmony and of schwa in French are acknowledged in handbooks and companions to phonology.

== Major publications ==
- 1989 "The Minimality Condition in Phonology". Journal of Linguistics 25.1: 159-187.
- 1990 "Licence to govern". Phonology 7: 233-253.
- 1991 Conditions on Phonological Government. Cambridge: Cambridge University Press.
- 1992 "Mongolian and Polish meet Government Licensing". SOAS Working Papers in Linguistics and Phonetics 2: 275-291.
- 1994 "Vowel Harmony and Switching in Turkic languages". SOAS Working Papers in Linguistics and Phonetics 4: 31-52. Also in Kardela, Henryk, Bogdan Szymanek (eds.), A Festschrift for Edmund Gussmann, 29-56. Lublin 1996: University Press of the Catholic University of Lublin.
- 1996 "Licensing constraints and vowel harmony in Turkic languages". SOAS Working Papers in Linguistics and Phonetics 6: 1-25. Also in Cyran, Eugeniusz (ed.), Structure and Interpretation. Studies in Phonology, 65-88. Lublin 1998: Folium.
- 1998 "Empty and pseudo-empty categories". SOAS Working Papers in Linguistics and Phonetics 8: 167-176.
- 2000 "When p-licensing fails: the final high vowels of Turkish". SOAS Working Papers in Linguistics: 3-18.
- 2003 "Empty and pseudo-empty categories". In Living on the Edge. 28 papers in honour of Jonathan Kaye, Stefan Ploch (ed.), 465-479. Berlin, New York: Mouton de Gruyter.
- 2004 "Defining the structure of Turkish words". SOAS Working Papers in Linguistics 13: 49-79.
- 2006 "The end of the (Turkish) word". SOAS Working Papers in Linguistics 14: 23-40.
- 2008 "The vital role of the trochaic foot in explaining Turkish word endings". Lingua 118.1: 46-65.
- 2018 "The internal TR clusters of Acadian French: a hint from schwa". In: Lindsey, Geoff and Nevins, Andrew, (eds.), Sonic Signatures. Amsterdam: John Benjamins.
