= Phonological opacity =

Phonological opacity is a phenomenon in phonology. Opacity exists when a phonological rule that exists in a given language appears to be contradicted by the surface structure (i.e., actual pronunciation) of words in the language. Opacity is a property of a certain surface structure, rather than a specific rule. The term was first defined by Kiparsky in the following way:

A phonological rule P, $A \rightarrow B / C \underline{\quad} D$, is opaque if one of the following surface structures exists:

- instance of A in the $C \underline{\quad} D$ environment;
- instance of B created by P in an environment other than $C \underline{\quad} D$;

Although we sometimes talk of opaque rules, a rule by itself is not opaque, it is the interaction between two rules that creates an opaque surface form (i.e., it becomes difficult to understand which rules were applied and how these rules interacted).

== Kiparsky's Classic Model of Rule-Based Serialism ==
Traditionally, there are four recognized, pairwise ordered, rule relations in rule-based serialism:

Given two rules A, B such that A precedes B,

- A feeds B iff A creates additional inputs to B
- A bleeds B iff A eliminates potential inputs to B
- B counterfeeds A iff B creates additional inputs to A
- B counterbleeds A iff B eliminates potential inputs to A

=== Example Rules ===
For the purpose of eliciting each rule interaction in the classic model, we'll use two example rules.

Rule A is a Deletion rule, where a vowel ( V ) is deleted ( Ø ) when it precedes another vowel ( __ V ). We represent this rule as V → Ø / __ V.

Rule B is a Palatalization rule, where a voiceless stop /t/ palatalizes to the affricate [tʃ] when preceding /e/ ( __ e ). We represent this rule as t → tʃ / __ e.

=== Feeding ===
Rule A feeds B when it occurs before B and helps B to apply. This can happen either because A creates an output that is the input for B; or A creates an output that is an environment where B can occur.

In a hypothetical language with a word like /tue/, if Deletion occurs first it is said to feed Palatalization. Through the deletion of the vowel [u] (because it precedes another vowel [e]), Deletion has created an environment where Palatalization can occur, palatalizing [t] to [tʃ]. We derive [tʃe] from /tue/.

		/tue/
Deletion:	V → Ø / __ V	Ø
Palatalization:	t → tʃ / __ e	tʃ
		[tʃe]

This type of rule ordering is said to be transparent, because the surface form seems to be following all rules of the language. In fact, if we look at the surface form [tʃe], we see a [tʃ] segment preceding an [e] segment. In other words, palatalization has correctly applied. The fact that /u/ was deleted and that we derived [tʃ] from /t/ is irrelevant in our assessment of whether this surface form is transparent or opaque.

=== Bleeding ===
Rule A bleeds B when it occurs before B and hinders B from applying. This can happen either because A and B have the same input but A gets to it first; or if the input for A is the environment where B could've occurred.

In the case of /teo/, Palatalization would've occurred if it preceded Deletion. However, since Deletion occurs before, it removes the environment where Palatalization would've occurred. We derive [to] from /teo/.

		/teo/
Deletion:	V → Ø / __ V	Ø
Palatalization:	t → tʃ / __ e
		[to]

This type of rule ordering is said to be transparent, because the surface form seems to be following all rules of the language. In fact, if we look at the surface form [to], we see a [t] segment preceding an [o] segment. No rules of this hypothetical language seem to be violated. The fact that /e/ was deleted and that we weren't able to derive [tʃ] from /t/ because of this deletion is irrelevant in our assessment of whether this surface form is transparent or opaque.

=== Counterfeeding ===
Rule A counterfeeds B when it occurs before B and helps B to apply. Additionally, rule B would've fed rule A if it preceded it, however it didn't. Counterfeeding can be seen as the reverse rule ordering of feeding.

If we look back at /tue/, in this example Palatalization precedes Deletion. However, Palatalization can't occur because there is no relevant environment for it (namely, /t/ isn't preceding /e/ yet). Then, Deletion of /u/ occurs, making /t/ and /e/ adjacent. Deletion occurs too late for Palatalization to do anything about it. We derive [te] from /tue/.

		/tue/
Palatalization:	t → tʃ / __ e
Deletion:	V → Ø / __ V	Ø
		[te]

This type of rule ordering is said to be opaque, because the surface form seems to have an environment where a rule of the language could still apply. In fact, if we look at the surface form [te], we see a [t] segment preceding an [e] segment. We know that we have a palatalization rule, and it seems like it hasn't applied here, i.e. it seems like it has underapplied.

Note that no rule has actually underapplied, it only appears as if it did. If there actually is underapplication of a rule in a dataset, there's a problem with the rule. In the case of counterfeeding, all rules have applied correctly, but their ordering makes it appear like it didn't. Thus, this surface form is opaque.

=== Counterbleeding ===
Rule A counterbleeds B when it occurs before B and hinders B from applying. Additionally, rule B would've bled rule A if it preceded it, however it didn't. Counterbleeding can be seen as the reverse rule ordering of bleeding.

If we look back at /teo/, where Palatalization precedes Deletion, /t/ precedes /e/, therefore palatalizes into /tʃ/. /e/ precedes /o/, allowing for Deletion to occur. Palatalization doesn't hinder Deletion, so when Deletion occurs, it removes any evidence of the Palatalization environment. We derive [tʃo] from /teo/.

		/teo/
Palatalization:	t → tʃ / __ e	tʃ
Deletion:	V → Ø / __ V	Ø
		[tʃo]

This type of rule ordering is said to be opaque, because the surface form seems to have an environment where a rule of the language shouldn't have applied. In fact, if we look at the surface form [tʃo], we see a [tʃ] segment preceding an [o] segment. We know that we have a palatalization rule, but this rule only applies when /t/ precedes /e/, but not /o/; i.e. it seems like it has overapplied.

Note that no rule has actually overapplied, it only appears as if it did. If there actually is overapplication of a rule in a dataset, there's a problem with the rule. In the case of counterbleeding, all rules have applied correctly, but their ordering makes it appear like it didn't. Thus, this surface form is opaque.

=== Focus vs. Environment ===
Sometimes a distinction is made between counterfeeding/counterbleeding on focus and counterfeeding/counterbleeding on environment, which specifies the position of the interaction.

Counterfeeding on focus means that rule B would've fed rule A, and would've done so by having an output that is rule A's input:

	/ata/
Rule A:	d → ð / __ V
Rule B:	t → d / V __
	[ada]

Counterbleeding on focus means that rule B would've bled rule A, and would've done so by having an input that is rule A's input.

	/at/
Rule A:	t → d / V __
Rule B:	t → s / __ #
	[ad]

Counterfeeding on environment means that rule B would've fed rule A, and would've done so by having an output that is rule A's environment which would have allowed rule A to apply:

	/sen/
Rule A:	s → ʃ / __ i
Rule B:	e → i / __ n
	[sin]

Counterbleeding on environment means that rule B would've fed rule A, and would've done so by having an input that is rule A's environment which would not have allowed rule A to apply:

	/anpa/
Rule A:	n → m / __ p
Rule B:	p → f / __ V
	[amfa]

== Hypothesized Consequences of Opacity ==
=== Learnability ===
Opacity is said to affect the learnability of certain forms during a child's acquisition of language. Namely, a child will have a harder time acquiring these opaque forms, because they are not predicted by the rules of its language, rules that it either is in the process of acquiring, or has fully acquired. Some research suggests that transparent rule orderings (i.e., feeding and bleeding) result in better acquisition, while opaque forms are harder to learn. This is intuitive and follows what is called the transparency bias. However, further research shows that there is also a maximum utilization bias, where forms that have both rules apply (i.e., feeding and counterbleeding) are acquired easier than those that apply only once (bleeding and counterfeeding). This bias varies with the types of rules that are applied, where generally speaking, the patterns are predicted by the transparency bias, while patterns involving palatalization processes tend to be predicted with the MaxUtil bias. Deletion seems to favor counterfeeding over counterbleeding, which isn't predicted by any of the aforementioned biases, but other experiment-specific factors for this pattern might be involved, such as the choice of stimuli given to participants.

=== Opacity as a Discrepancy ===
In many instances, the presence of opacity in an analysis can indicate that something has gone awry. It can often suggest that the framework used to analyze the data is flawed or unsuitable, and that a different framework is required to better explain a process. This is famously made evident with the Duke of York derivation.

The Grand Old Duke of York
He had ten thousand men
He marched them up a great high hill
And he marched them down again.

Duke of York derivations are described to be similar to the little nursery rhyme that accompanies its name: a certain process turns A into B, and then another process turns B back into A, seemingly achieving nothing. Duke of York derivations are not really interesting, except that they sometimes indicate that something is wrong in our own analysis. Some argue that DOY derivations are unnatural and difficult to learn. DOY derivations are more common in syntax, where one process can often undo another one.

Another example for opacity as an indicator for framework issue is the nasalization process in Bulgarian. If we analyze this process using a rule-based framework, it seems at first that there is opacity. Despite being underlyingly voiced, /n/ doesn’t devoice word-finally like other consonants in Bulgarian. Instead, when a word with a final /n/ is suffixed, the previous vowel becomes nasalized and the /n/ is deleted:

кон	/kɔn/ → [kɔn]	“horse”
конски	/kɔnski/ → [kɔ̃ski]	“of horse type”
тон	/tɔn/ → [tɔn]	“tone”
тонколона	/tɔnkɔlɔna/ → [tɔ̃kulɔna]	“speaker” (literally “tone-column”)

These processes can be formalized using the following rules:

		/kɔnski/
Nasalization:	V → [+nasal] / __nC	ɔ̃
N-Elision:	n → ∅ / __C	∅
		[kɔ̃ski]

Ordered in the above way, Nasalization appears to have overapplied. N-Elision counterbleeds Nasalization i.e., it removes the environment required for Nasalization to apply, so on the surface it appears as if Nasalization applies when it shouldn’t. This is counterbleeding opacity.

Opacity in this case arises from the analytical framework itself. However, analyzing this phenomenon using an autosegmental phonology framework may provide a better, simpler, and more parsimonious explanation for this process, without running into the issue of opacity. The Laryngeal node delinks because it isn't licensed (the following segment is not a sonorant). The nasal segment deletes, but the Supra-Laryngeal node remains, and the nasal feature with it. The nasal feature then spread to the preceding vowel, nasalizing it.

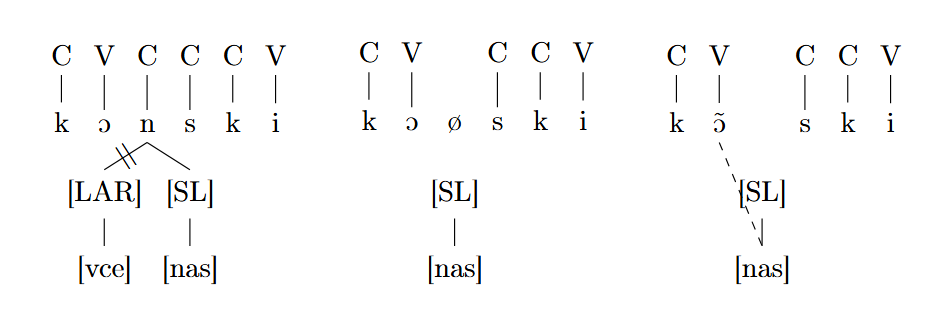
From left to right: Laryngeal node delinks because it is not licensed (isn't followed by an obstruent). The nasal deletes, but the SL node remains, and the [nas] feature with it. [nas] spreads to the vowel, making it nasalized.

This gives a better explanation for the derivation of [kɔ̃ski], without running into the issues of opacity.

== Opacity in Optimality Theory ==
The classical model of optimality theory, often called Parallel OT, is notorious for being unable to account for opaque surface forms. Candidates in OT are evaluated against a set of ordered constraints, and the candidate with the least amount of violated constraints is selected as the optimal candidate (if correctly done, the actual surface production). Not being able to account for opacity is in the nature of the model itself, since OT doesn't account for intermediate forms. In fact, if we are to exclude faithfulness constraints, OT disregards underlying representations entirely for a more surface-true analysis.

Nonetheless, variations of OT have sprung up in the recent years, focusing specifically on explaining and predicting opacity, either by making changes to our understanding of constraints, or by integrating some kind of intermediate forms, allowing serial derivations. Such variations include Harmonic Serialism, where candidates can pass through the derivation more than once, therefore allowing for a serial application of constraints, allowing for intermediate forms; or Stratal OT, where different constraints, or grammars, apply at different strata (stem, word, post-lexical), therefore allowing a serial derivation.

== Issues with the Classic Model ==
It is argued that phonological opacity is often the result of the counterfeeding or counterbleeding order of two or more phonological rules, which should result in underapplication and overapplication of a rule, respectively.

However, it has been shown that there are multiple cases that aren't accounted for by this classic model, namely situations where opacity isn't the result of rule ordering, but also where certain rule orderings that should result in opacity (i.e. counterfeeding and counterbleeding) do not. More complex rule interactions appear to exist apart from the original four.

=== Underapplication without Counterfeeding ===
Fed counterfeeding is a situation where Rule A creates an opportunity for Rule B to apply (thus feeding), and Rule B creates an opportunity for Rule A to apply (but Rule A doesn't apply again, thus counterfeeding). Like for regular counterfeeding/counterbleeding, fed counterfeeding relations are also sometimes distinguished by either being on focus or on environment.

==== Blocking ====
Another well known source of underapplication is Blocking. A rule is said to be blocked when it fails to apply to a form even when that form meets the requirements for that rule. Often, three types of blocking are distinguished: Disjunctive Blocking, Non-Derived Environment Blocking, and the ingeniously named Do-Something-Except-When Blocking.

Disjunctive Blocking is when a rule is blocked if a more specific conflicting rule can also apply. Follows an example of stress rules in Latin (simplified):

A. V → [+stress] / __ CVCCVC# (stress the antepenult if the penult is light)
B. V → [+stress] / __ CVC# (stress the penult)
C. V → [+stress] / __ C# (stress the ultima)

Rule a. applies to words that fit the descriptions of A,B, and C (pa'tricia, 'reficit); however, rule b only applies to words that fit the descriptions of B and C (re'fectus, re'fecit, 'aqua, 'amo); finally, rule C only applies to words that fir the description of C('mens, 'cor, 're).

Non-derived Environment Blocking is when a rule is blocked if its structural description is not derived phonologically or morphologically. In other words, a certain rule A must apply in order for the rule B to every apply. If rule A has not applied first, rule B will not apply even if there is an opportunity for it to do so.

Do-Something-Except-When Blocking is when a rule is blocked from creating structures that are not allowed to surface for unrelated reasons. If a rule is about to create a sequence of segments that is not attested in the current language, the rule will be blocked.

A common example for unattested structures appearing in English is in first language acquisition. Children may sometimes have rules that, when combined, create sequences that are not attested in English, or any language for that matter. One notable example is from Amahl, who between the ages of 2 and 3 produced [tl] onsets, as a result of an [s] → [t] rule and a [r] → [l] rule in complex onsets, turning words like "slowly" [sloli] into [tloli]. The [tl] onset is largely unattested, except arguably in Bulgarian, although words that contain it are either archaic and unused, or the [tɫ] onset becomes [tw], which is easier to produce.

=== Overapplication without Counterbleeding ===
Self-destructive Feeding is when feeding causes overapplication opacity. In other words, a rule A feeds a rule B, and then that rule B removes the environment for rule A. Intuitively, this only happens with deletion, where rule A deletes a segment resulting in the correct environment for B, and then B also deletes a segment. A common example of this is from Turkish.

		/ajag+sɯ/
Elision:	s → ∅ / C __	∅
Deletion:	g → ∅ / V __ V	∅
		[ajaɯ]

Mutual Bleeding is when a rule A bleeds a rule B, and the rule B would also bleed rule A if it were ordered before it. This is similar to Fed Counterfeeding. In fact, mutual bleeding can be called Bled Counterbleeding, just like fed counterfeeding could potentially be called mutual feeding. The overapplication here stems from the inability of the second rule to apply (thus counterbleeding), however the forms that surface are not opaque, since the only rule that did apply is the first one (thus bleeding). Since bleeding is transparent, the resulting surface form is also transparent.
