= John McCarthy (linguist) =

American linguist

John Joseph McCarthy
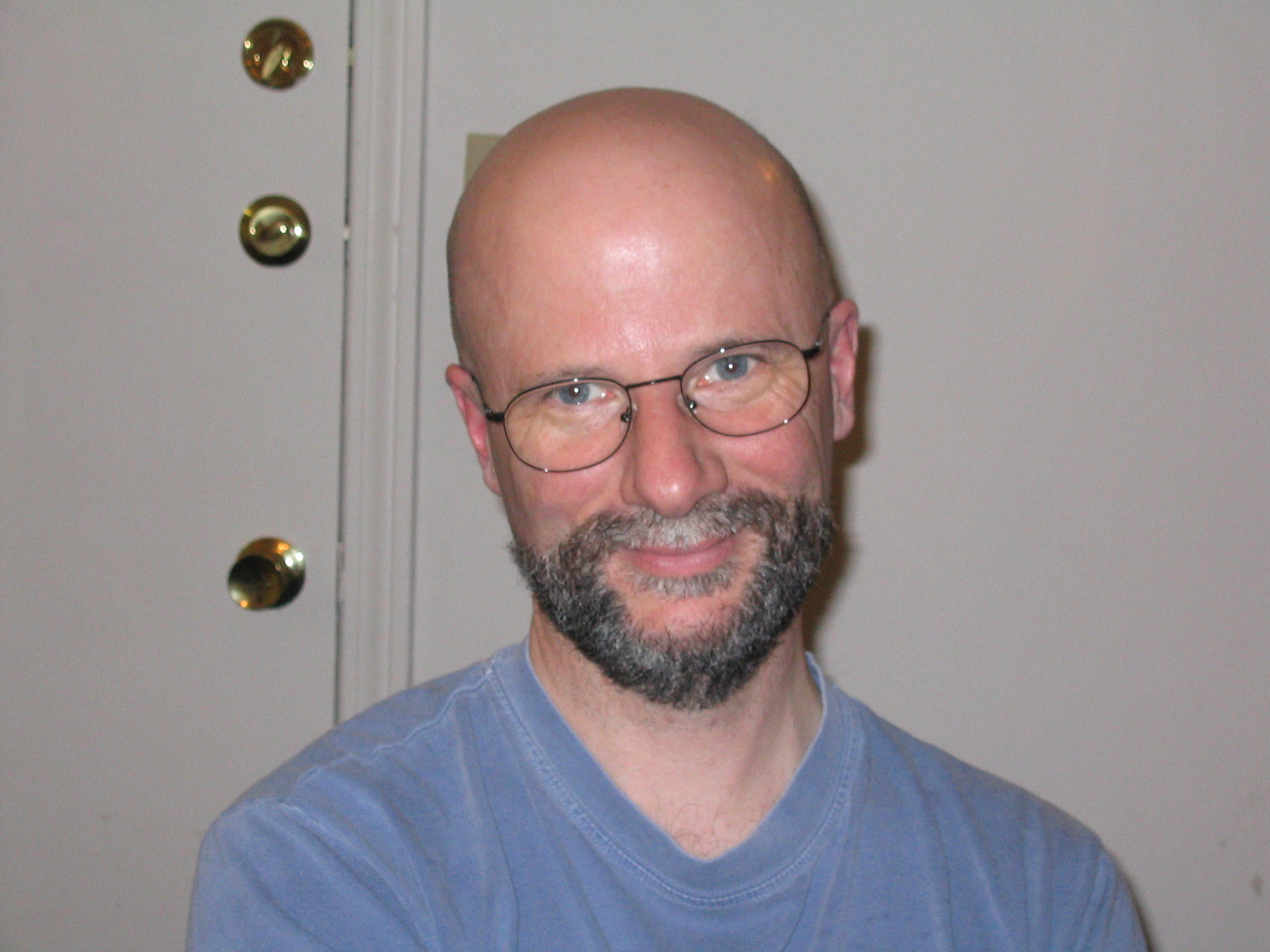
- Born: 1953 (age 72–73); Medford, Massachusetts, U.S.
- Education: MIT (PhD), Harvard College (AB)
- Scientific career
- Fields: linguistics
- Thesis: Formal problems in semitic phonology and morphology (1979)
- Doctoral advisor: Morris Halle
- Other academic advisors: Paul Kiparsky, Jay Keyser, Joan Bresnan, Jim Harris, Mark Liberman, Edwin S. Williams
- Doctoral students: Linda Lombardi; Paul de Lacy

John Joseph McCarthy (born 1953) is an American linguist and the Provost and Senior Vice Chancellor for Academic Affairs at the University of Massachusetts Amherst since July 2017. In July 2018, he assumed office as the Provost.

McCarthy is best-known for his work on Optimality Theory in phonology: with Alan Prince, he devised Correspondence Theory and alignment constraints, although he has subsequently renounced the latter. He has since written textbooks like Doing Optimality Theory: Applying Theory to Data. Earlier in his career, McCarthy was responsible, along with Prince, for extending autosegmental phonology, and later Optimality Theory, to morphology, in particular to solve the problem of nonconcatenative morphology in Semitic languages.

== Career ==
He completed his A.B. in linguistics and Near Eastern languages at Harvard College and obtained his Ph.D. from MIT in 1979. He was a professor at the University of Texas at Austin and a visiting scientist at Bell Labs before moving to the University of Massachusetts Amherst.

== Books ==
- Formal Problems in Semitic Phonology and Morphology, Routledge 2018
- Doing Optimality Theory: Applying Theory to Data, Wiley-Blackwell 2008
- Optimality Theory in Phonology: A Reader (ed.), Wiley-Blackwell 2008
- A Thematic Guide to Optimality Theory, Cambridge University Press 2001

== See also ==
- Nonconcatenative morphology
