= Jane Grimshaw =

Jane Barbara Grimshaw (born 1951) is a Distinguished Professor [emerita] in the Department of Linguistics at Rutgers University-New Brunswick. She is known for her contributions to the areas of syntax, optimality theory, language acquisition, and lexical representation.

== Education ==
Grimshaw received her B.A. in anthropology and linguistics from University College London in 1973, and her Ph.D. in linguistics from the University of Massachusetts Amherst in 1977.

== Career ==
Grimshaw was on the faculty of Linguistics at Brandeis University from 1977 to 1992. There she worked closely with Ray Jackendoff, with whom she was a co-principal investigator on several projects.

In 1992, she joined the faculty of Linguistics at Rutgers. She is a member of the Rutgers Center for Cognitive Science (RuCCS), and was the acting co-director from 2011 to 2012.

She taught at two Linguistic Society of America Linguistic Summer Institutes: University of California, Santa Cruz (1991) and University of Illinois at Urbana–Champaign (1999).

She served on the Executive Committee of the Linguistic Society of America from 1996 to 1998.

== Personal life ==
Grimshaw is married to linguist Alan Prince.

== Selected publications ==
- Grimshaw, Jane B. (1985). English wh-constructions and the theory of grammar. New York: Garland Pub. ISBN 0824054482.
- Grimshaw, Jane (1990). Argument structure (1st ed.). Cambridge, Mass.: MIT Press. ISBN 9780262570909.
- Coopmans, Peter; Everaert, Martin; Grimshaw, Jane, eds. (2000). Lexical specification and insertion. Amsterdam: John Benjamins Publisher. ISBN 9789027299581.
- Legendre, Géraldine; Grimshaw, Jane; Vikner, Sten, eds. (2001). Optimality-theoretic syntax. Cambridge: MIT Press. ISBN 9780262621380.
- Grimshaw, Jane (2005). Words and structure (2nd ed.). Stanford, Calif.: CSLI (Center for the Study of Language and Information). ISBN 9781575864228.
- Zaenen, Annie; Simpson, Jane; King, Tracy Holloway; Grimshaw, Jane; Maling, Joan; Manning, Christopher, eds. (2007). Architectures, rules, and preferences: variations on themes by Joan W. Bresnan. Stanford, Calif.: CSLI Publications, Center for the Study of Language and Information. ISBN 9781575865607.
- Selected Papers in Optimality Theory:
  - Projection, heads, and optimality (ROA 68)
  - The best clitic: Constraint conflict in morphosyntax (ROA 250)
  - Optimal clitic positions and the lexicon in romance clitic systems (ROA 374)
  - Economy of structure in OT (ROA 434)
  - Chains as unfaithful optima (ROA 844.04)
  - Location specific constraints in matrix and subordinate clauses (with supplementary materials) (ROA 857, 1201)
  - Last resorts and grammaticality (ROA 892.02), in Optimality Theory and Minimalism: A Possible Convergence, Broekhuis, Hans, and Vogel, Ralf, eds.
  - Last resorts: A typology of do-support (with supplementary materials) (ROA 1111, 1127)
  - Linguistic and cognitive explanation in Optimality Theory, with Bruce Tesar and Alan Prince. in Lepore, Ernest; Pylyshyn, Zenon (1999). What is Cognitive Science?. Blackwell.

== Awards and honors ==
- Sloan Post-doctoral Fellowship, Center for Cognitive Science, Massachusetts Institute of Technology (1979–80)
- American Council of Learned Societies Research Fellowship (1982–83)
- Bernstein Faculty Fellowship, Brandeis University (1984–85)
- Fellowship, Center for Advanced Study in the Behavioral Sciences (2000–2001)
