= Doing Optimality Theory =

Book by John McCarthy

Doing Optimality Theory: Applying Theory to Data
- Author: John McCarthy
- Language: English
- Subject: Optimality theory
- Publisher: Wiley-Blackwell
- Publication date: 2008
- Media type: Print (hardcover)

Doing Optimality Theory: Applying Theory to Data is a 2008 book by John McCarthy in which the author provides a practical introduction to optimality theory, a frame theoretically presented with the book A Thematic Guide to Optimality Theory by the same author.

== Reception ==
The book was reviewed by Kyoko Yamaguchi, Walcir Cardoso, Sam Hellmuth and Eulàlia Bonet.
