= John Ohala =

American linguist specializing in phonetics (1941–2020)

- Born: July 19, 1941; Chicago, Illinois, U.S.
- Died: August 23, 2020 (aged 79); Berkeley, California, U.S.
- Spouse: Manjari Agrawal (m. 1969)

Academic background
- Education: University of California, Los Angeles
- Thesis: Aspects of the control and production of speech (1969)
- Doctoral advisor: Peter Ladefoged

Academic work
- Discipline: Linguistics
- Sub-discipline: Phonology
- Institutions: University of California, Berkeley
- Doctoral students: John Kingston

John Jerome Ohala (July 19, 1941 – August 22, 2020) was a linguist specializing in phonetics and phonology. He was a Professor Emeritus in linguistics at the University of California, Berkeley.

== Early life and education ==
Ohala was born on July 19, 1941 in Chicago, Illinois. As a teenager, he worked numerous odd jobs, including as a gardener, babysitter, and short-order cook.

He received his BA in English from Notre Dame in 1963, before going on to get his MA in Linguistics from University of California, Los Angeles (UCLA) in 1966.

== Career ==
Ohala received his PhD in linguistics in 1969 from the University of California, Los Angeles (UCLA); his graduate advisor was Peter Ladefoged. He did a post-doctoral fellowship at Tokyo University for one year on the larynx before joining the faculty at University of California, Berkeley.

At UC Berkeley, Ohala founded the Phonology Laboratory. In 1991, Ohala organized the first International Conference on Spoken Language Processing in Banff, Alberta.

From 1995 to 1999, Ohala was president of the International Phonetic Association.

He is best known for his insistence that many aspects of languages' phonologies (a.k.a. "sound patterns") derive from physical and physiological constraints which are independent of language and thus have no place in the "grammar" of a language, i.e. what speakers have to learn inductively from exposure to the speech community into which they are born.

He also proposed that ethological principles influence certain aspects of languages' prosodic patterns, sound symbolism, and facial expressions, such as lip and brow movements.

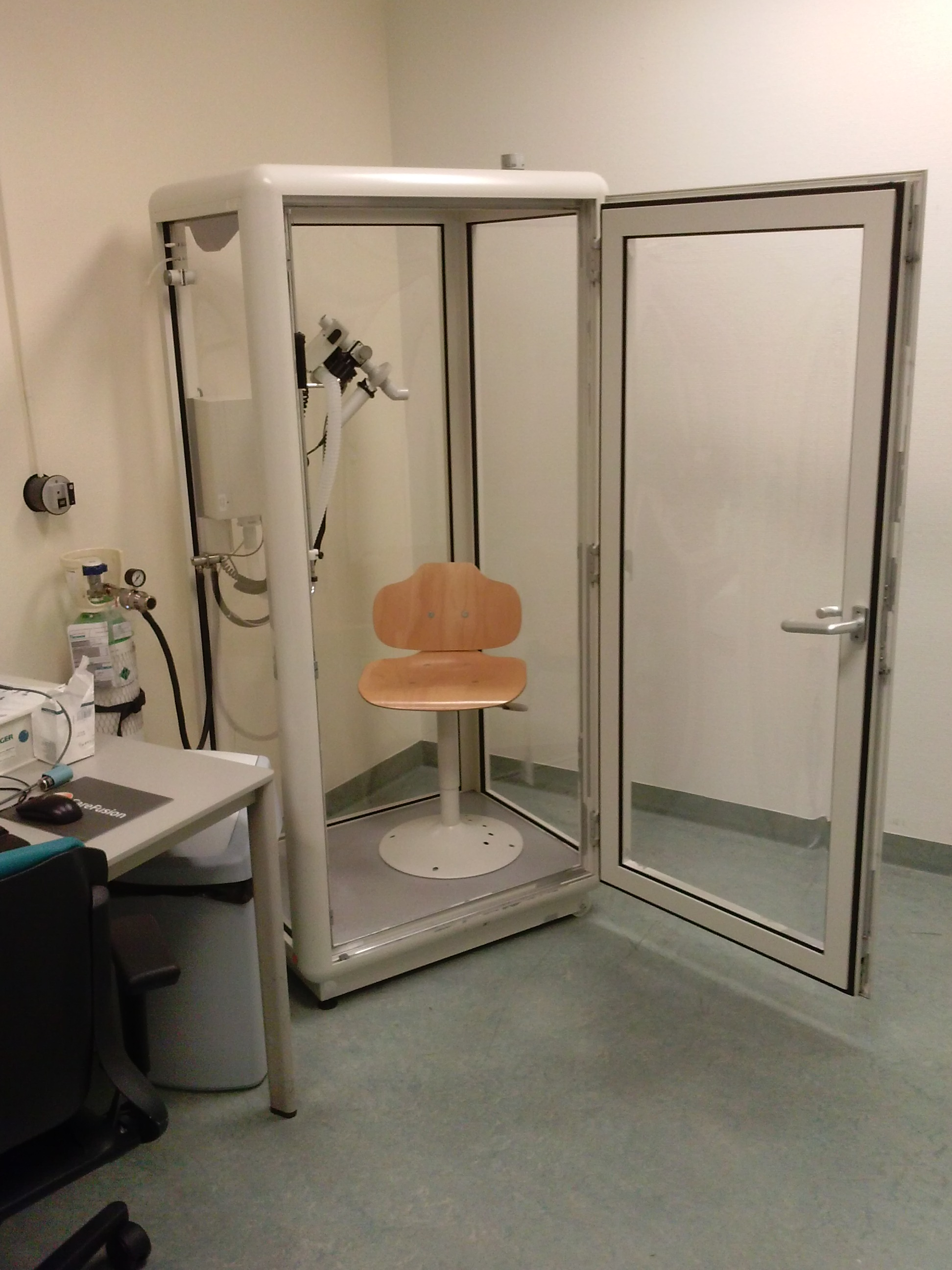
An example of a whole-body plethysmograph, which Ohala would use to measure sub-glottal pressure

Ohala invented many phonetic instruments. According to his colleague Ian Maddieson, Ohala was "was a superb experimentalist, creating tools to do the job when none previously existed." For instance, he developed the method of using a whole-body plethysmograph for measuring sub-glottal pressure. Ohala also invented the photoelectric thyroumbrometer to measure larynx movement. Other Ohala inventions include the photoelectric glottograph and nasograph.

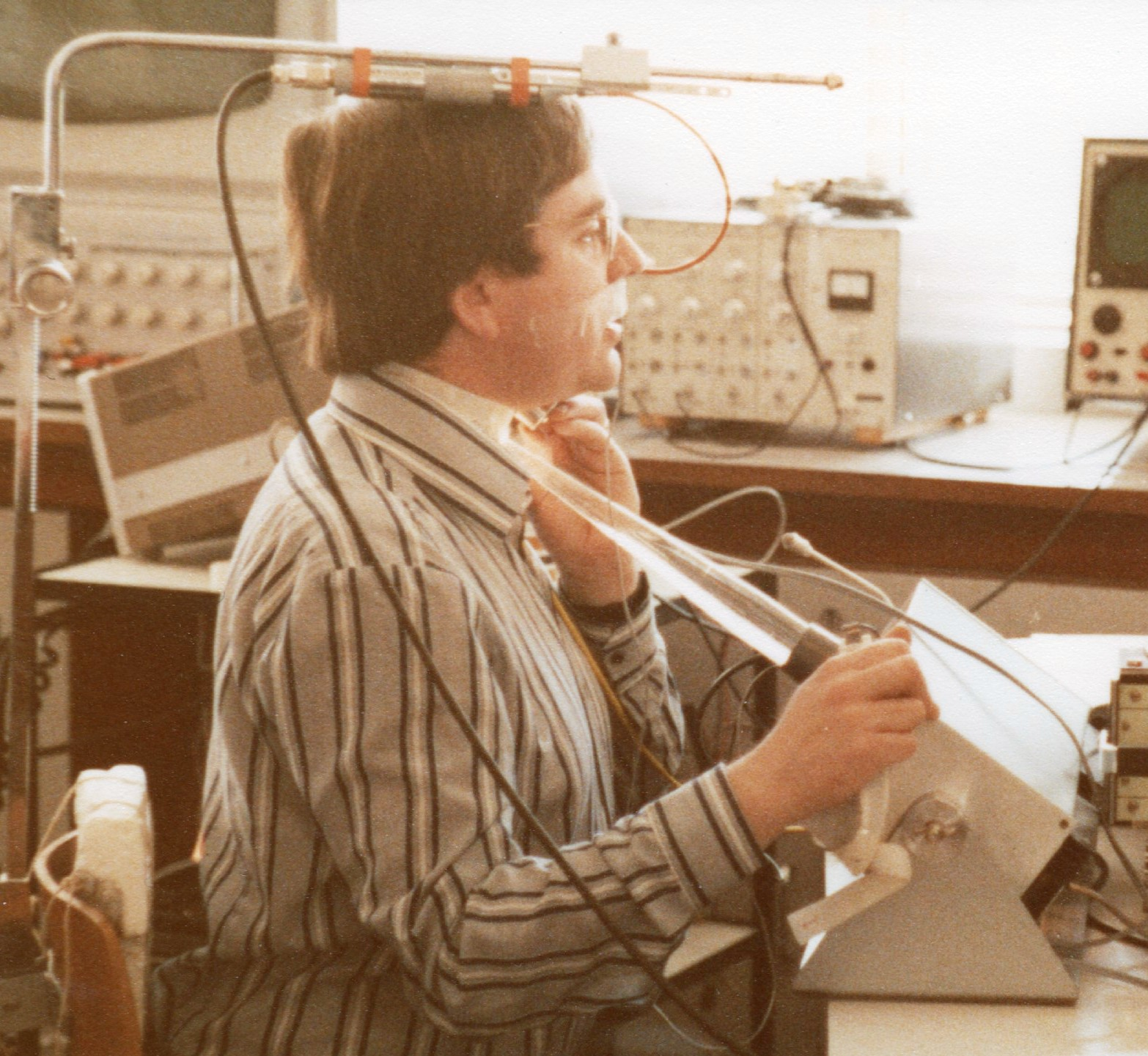
A speaker recording with a photoelectric glottograph in 1978

Over his career, Ohala received two festschrifts in honor of his contribution to the field.

== Personal life ==
Ohala married his wife, Manjari Ohala (née Agrawal), in New Delhi on November 24, 1969, after the completion of his PhD. Manjari is also a linguist specializing in phonetics and phonology. They were married for 51 years, until his death.

Ohala enjoyed hiking in the East Bay Hills, particularly Mount Diablo, and one of his hobbies was nature photography. In addition to photographing birds and nature, Ohala notably documented civil rights marches of the 60s and 70s. In particular, his photography of the 1963 March on Washington was used for the 50th anniversary of the march by Berkeley Public Library.

Ohala retired from teaching in 2004. He died on August 22, 2020 at his home off of Grizzly Peak in Berkeley, California.

== Honors and awards ==
- Honorary PhD from the University of Copenhagen (1992)
- Berkeley Citation Award (2004)
- Medal for Scientific Achievement by the International Speech Communication Association (2006)
- Silver Medal in Speech Communication by the Acoustical Society of America (2015)
