= Government phonology =

Theoretical framework in linguistics

Government Phonology (GP) is a theoretical framework of linguistics, and more specifically of phonology. The framework aims to provide a non-arbitrary account for phonological phenomena by replacing the rule component of SPE-type phonology with well-formedness constraints on representations. Thus, it is a non-derivational representation-based framework, and as such, the current representative of Autosegmental Phonology. GP subscribes to the claim that Universal Grammar is composed of a restricted set of universal principles and parameters. As in Noam Chomsky’s principles and parameters approach to syntax, the differences in phonological systems across languages are captured through different combinations of parameter settings.

== Element Theory ==
The sub-theory of GP modelling the internal structure of segments is called Element Theory (ET). Like chemical elements, the melodic primes of ET are phonetically interpretable alone as well as in combinations - hence their name. They are assumed, depending on the version of ET, to correspond to either characteristic acoustic signatures in the signal, or articulatory gestures (or hot features, as previously referred to). Unlike the (binary) distinctive features of Structuralist Phonology and SPE, each element is a monovalent (unary, single-valued) and potentially interpretable phonological expression.

ET has a number of versions and has since KLV 1985 been reformed in various ways with the aim of reducing the element inventory, to avoid overgeneration (being able to generate more structures than attested cross-linguistically). In its most widespread version, there are 6 elements believed to be existent across all languages: (A), (I), (U), (ʔ), (L) and (H), representing openness/coronality, frontness/palatality, roundness/labiality, stopness, voicing/nasality and frication/aspiration, respectively. Their actual interpretation depends on what phonological constituent dominates them, and whether they occupy a head or operator position within a phonological expression. For instance, when simplex, (I) is interpreted as /i/ in a syllable peak (nucleus), but as /j/ at a syllable edge (typically, in a syllable onset). (A) makes /a/ in a nucleus but /r/ in a consonantal position. In complex phonological expressions, the phonetic properties mix in proportion to the head/operator status: the (A, I) expression is both open (non-high) and front, but it is more probably interpreted as [e] when the head is (I), and as [ɛ] or [æ] when the head is (A).

== Syllable structure without syllables ==
In its classical form (sometimes referred to as GP 1.0), developed in KLV 1990, prosodic structure is modelled as a sequence of Onset-Rhyme (O-R) pairs, where the syllable rhyme obligatorily contains a nucleus (N). According to their parameter settings (see above), languages may allow any of these syllabic constituents to branch (into two, maximally). Similarly to Government and Binding syntax, constituents are governing domains in which the head (or governor) governs, that is, establishes an asymmetrical, dependency relation with the governee (or complement) - it is this feature of GP that it takes its name from. A unique property of GP as a theoretical model is the denial of the constituenthood (that is, the theoretical status) of two of the components of classical syllabic theory: the coda on the one hand, and the syllable itself on the other. The coda is shown to be unable to branch universally, which is in GP explained by assuming no coda node in the representation (and only positing what is dubbed "post-nuclear rhymal complement"); the syllable (hypothetically, a higher-order constituent dominating each O-R pair) does not qualify as an intraconstituent governing domain since its head (the R) follows its complement (the O) rather than preceding it, as observed in all other cases of branching constituents.

As in mainstream Autosegmental Phonology, GP claims that the O may be empty in certain languages, either word-initially (producing surface vowel-initial words) or word-internally (producing sequences of heterosyllabic vowels, that is, hiatuses), or both. GP also claims that certain languages license empty nuclei, which are subject to the phonological Empty Category Principle (ECP), similarly to the empty categories of syntax. Crucially, all surface word-final consonants are Onsets followed by an empty Nucleus (called domain-final empty nucleus, or FEN), which is licensed by parameter: languages in which the parameter is switched on allow for (surface) consonant-final words (like English), whereas languages in which the parameter is off have all their (content) words ending in a vowel as well as various repair strategies modifying foreign words and loanwords so that they satisfy the constraint (e.g., Italian, Japanese). Another special case is word-initial /sC/ clusters (as in English sport, stop, school), which are analysed in Kaye (1992) as surface manifestations of underlying sequences of an empty N plus rhyme-final /s/ plus O, where the initial empty N is parametrically licensed ("magically", as Kaye puts it) - this effect has been known as "Magic Licensing".

== GP today ==
Today, whilst Optimality Theory has become the dominant framework in generative, formal phonological theory, GP continues to develop. In 1996, Lowenstamm proposed that syllable structure should be further reduced to strictly alternating onsets (symbolised by "C") and nuclei ("V") - all surface clusters sandwich empty categories, which conform to the ECP (see above). This version of GP has become known as Strict CV Phonology or CVCV Phonology, and is currently the most widely accepted model of prosodic structure within GP circles. (See Tobias Scheer's and Péter Szigetvári's work.)

The other major current trend in GP is represented by Pöchtrager and his colleagues, who propose GP 2.0, another version of GP that strives to further reduce the number of elements by capturing manner of articulation (old (ʔ) and (h)/(H)) as well as element (A) with structure. Unlike CVCV Phonology's flat prosodic structure, configurations within GP 2.0 remain hierarchical and involve multiple layers, with the nodes entering into governing and m-commanding relations, very much as in X-bar theory syntax.

Further work in GP and GP-friendly frameworks includes ET-based research in laryngeal phonology, as well as analyses in Loose CV Phonology and Precedence-Free Phonology.

GP-ists and related researchers regularly meet at the Government Phonology Round Table (GPRT), a semi-informal meeting originally (starting in 1997) organised by teams of scholars at universities in Budapest, Hungary and Vienna, Austria. Later, a few events were organised in Slovenia. Recently, Budapest and Vienna have taken turns again as venues.
