= Harmonic grammar =

Linguistic model of well-formedness

Harmonic grammar is a linguistic model proposed by Geraldine Legendre, Yoshiro Miyata, and Paul Smolensky in 1990. It is a connectionist approach to modeling linguistic well-formedness. During the late 2000s and early 2010s, the term "harmonic grammar" was used to refer more generally to models of language that use weighted constraints, including ones that are not explicitly connectionist – see e.g. Pater (2009) and Potts et al. (2010).

== See also ==
- Optimality theory

== Bibliography ==
- Keller, Frank. (2000). Gradience in grammar: Experimental and computational aspects of degrees of grammaticality. (Doctoral dissertation, University of Edinburgh). (Online: homepages.inf.ed.ac.uk/keller/papers/phd.html).
- Keller, Frank. (2006). "Linear Optimality Theory as a model of gradience in grammar." In G. Fanselow, C. Fery, R. Vogel, & M. Schlesewsky (Eds.), Gradience in grammar: Generative perspectives. Oxford: Oxford University Press. (Online: homepages.inf.ed.ac.uk/keller/papers/oup06a.html).
- Legendre, Géraldine; Miyata, Yoshiro; & Smolensky, Paul. (1990). "Can connectionism contribute to syntax?: Harmonic Grammar, with an application." In M. Ziolkowski, M. Noske, & K. Deaton (Eds.), Proceedings of the 26th regional meeting of the Chicago Linguistic Society (pp. 237–252). Chicago: Chicago Linguistic Society.
- Legendre, Géraldine; Miyata, Yoshiro; & Smolensky, Paul. (1990). Can connectionism contribute to syntax?: Harmonic grammar, with an application. Report CU-CS-485-90. Computer Science Department, University of Colorado at Boulder. (Online: www.cs.colorado.edu/department/publications/reports/docs/CU-CS-485-90.pdf.)
- Legendre, Géraldine; Miyata, Yoshiro; & Smolensky, Paul. (1990). "Harmonic Grammar: A formal multi-level connectionist theory of linguistic well-formedness: Theoretical foundations." In Proceedings of the twelfth annual conference of the Cognitive Science Society (pp. 388–395). Cambridge, MA: Lawrence Erlbaum.
- Legendre, Géraldine; Miyata, Yoshiro; & Smolensky, Paul. (1990). Harmonic Grammar: A formal multi-level connectionist theory of linguistic well-formedness: Theoretical foundations. Report CU-CS-465-90. Computer Science Department, University of Colorado at Boulder. (Online: www.cs.colorado.edu/department/publications/reports/docs/CU-CS-465-90.pdf.)
- Legendre, Géraldine; Miyata, Yoshiro; & Smolensky, Paul. (1990). "Harmonic Grammar: A formal multi-level connectionist theory of linguistic well-formedness: An application." In Proceedings of the twelfth annual conference of the Cognitive Science Society (pp. 884–891). Cambridge, MA: Lawrence Erlbaum.
- Legendre, Géraldine; Miyata, Yoshiro; & Smolensky, Paul. (1990). Harmonic Grammar: A formal multi-level connectionist theory of linguistic well-formedness: An application. Report CU-CS-464-90; ICS technical report 90-4. Computer Science Department, University of Colorado at Boulder. (Online: www.cs.colorado.edu/department/publications/reports/docs/CU-CS-464-90.pdf.)
- Legendre, Géraldine; Miyata, Yoshiro; & Smolensky, Paul. (1991). Distributed recursive structure processing. Report CU-CS-514-91. Computer Science Department, University of Colorado at Boulder. (Online: www.cs.colorado.edu/department/publications/reports/docs/CU-CS-514-91.pdf.)
- Legendre, Géraldine; Miyata, Yoshiro; & Smolensky, Paul. (1991). "Unifying syntactic and semantic approaches to unaccusativity: A connectionist approach." In Proceedings of the 17th Annual Meeting of the Berkeley Linguistics Society (pp. 388–395). Berkeley. (Online: www.cs.colorado.edu/department/publications/reports/docs/CU-CS-532-91.pdf).
- Legendre, Géraldine; Sorace, Antonella; & Smolensky, Paul. (2006). "The Optimality Theory–Harmonic Grammar connection." In P. Smolensky & G. Legendre (Eds.), The harmonic mind: From neural computation to Optimality-Theoretic grammar (pp. 339–402). (Online: uit.no/getfile.php?PageId=874&FileId=187).
- Pater, Joe. (2009). "Weighted Constraints in Generative Linguistics". Cognitive Science 33: 999-1035.
- Potts, Christopher, Joe Pater, Karen Jesney, Rajesh Bhatt and Michael Becker. (2010). Harmonic Grammar with Linear Programming: From linear systems to linguistic typology. Phonology 27: 77–117.
- Prince, Alan. (2002). Anything goes. In ed. T. Honma, M. Okazaki, T. Tabata, & S. Tanaka (Eds.), New century of phonology and phonological theory (pp. 66–90). Tokyo: Kaitakusha. (Online: roa.rutgers.edu/view.php3?id=697).
- Prince, Alan; & Smolensky, Paul. (1991). Connectionism and harmony theory in linguistics. Report CU-CS-600-92. Computer Science Department, University of Colorado at Boulder. (Online: www.cs.colorado.edu/department/publications/reports/docs/CU-CS-533-91.pdf.)
- Prince, Alan; & Smolensky, Paul. (1993). Optimality Theory: Constraint interaction in generative grammar. RuCCS Technical Report 2, Rutgers University. Piscateway, NJ: Rutgers University Center for Cognitive Science. (Revised version published 2004). (Online: roa.rutgers.edu/view.php3?id=845).
- Smolensky, Paul. (1988). "On the proper treatment of connectionism". The Behavioral and Brain Sciences, 11, 1–23.
- Smolensky, Paul. (1990). "Tensor product variable binding and the representation of symbolic structures in connectionist networks". Artificial Intelligence, 46, 159–216.
- Smolensky, Paul; & Legendre, Géraldine. (2006). The harmonic mind: From neural computation to Optimality-Theoretic grammar (Vols. 1–2). Cambridge, MA: MIT Press.
- Smolensky, Paul; Legendre, Géraldine; & Miyata, Yoshiro. (1992). Principles for an integrated connectionist/symbolic theory of higher cognition. Report CU-CS-600-92. Computer Science Department, University of Colorado at Boulder.
- Smolensky, Paul; Legendre, Géraldine; & Miyata, Yoshiro. (1992). Integrating connectionist and symbolic computation for the theory of language. Computer Science Department Report CU-CS-628-92; Institute of Cognitive Science Report 92-16. Computer Science Department, University of Colorado at Boulder. (Online: www.cs.colorado.edu/department/publications/reports/docs/CU-CS-628-92.pdf).
- Smolensky, Paul; Legendre, Géraldine; & Miyata, Yoshiro. (1993). "Integrating connectionist and symbolic computation for the theory of language." Current Science, 64, 381–391.
- Tesar, Bruce. (2007). "A comparison of lexicographic and linear numeric optimization using violation difference ratios." Rutgers University. (Online: roa.rutgers.edu/view.php3?id=1351).
