= Sharon Inkelas =

Linguist

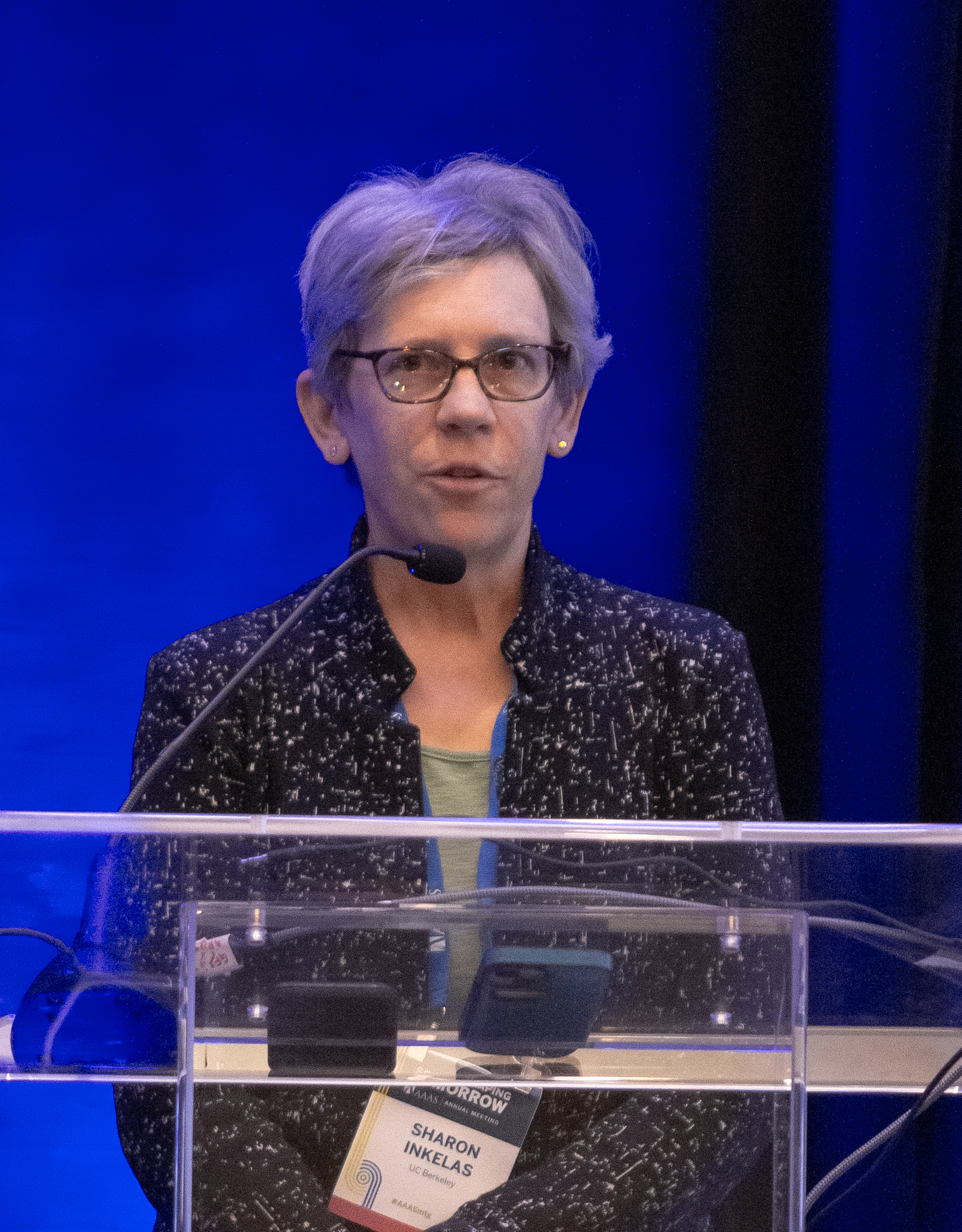
- Inkelas in 2025
- Occupation: Linguist

Academic background
- Education: Stanford University

Academic work
- Institutions: University of California, Berkeley
- Main interests: Phonology; morphology; reduplication; language acquisition; Turkish

Sharon Inkelas is a Professor and former Chair of the Linguistics Department at the University of California, Berkeley.

== Education and career ==
Inkelas completed her Bachelor of Arts in mathematics at Pomona College in 1984 and received her PhD in linguistics at Stanford University in 1989 with a dissertation, "Prosodic Constituency in the Lexicon," supervised by Paul Kiparsky. In 1990, she arrived at UC Berkeley as a Miller Institute for Basic Research in Science research fellow and became a faculty member at Berkeley in 1992. She was a Hellman Fellow in 1995. She was named the special faculty adviser to the chancellor on sexual violence/sexual harassment for a three-year term, beginning on July 24, 2017.

Inkelas is noted for her work on phonology interfaces and particularly the interaction between morphology and phonology. Her research interests include cophonology theory, reduplication, affix ordering, child phonology, and the analysis of Turkish.

== Honors ==
Inkelas has long been actively involved in the Linguistic Society of America, serving on their executive committee from 2016–2018. In 2020, Inkelas was inducted as a Fellow of the Linguistic Society of America.

== Personal ==
Inkelas is also a violinist: she played for the symphony orchestra of Stanford University and as of 2009 is a member of the symphony orchestra of the University of California, Davis .

== Selected publications ==
- "Reduplication", in Keith Brown, ed., Encyclopedia of Language and Linguistics, Elsevier: Oxford, pp. 417–419, 2006
- "Underspecification", in Keith Brown, ed., Encyclopedia of Language and Linguistics, Elsevier: Oxford, pp. 224–226, 2006
- "The architecture and the implementation of a finite state pronunciation lexicon for Turkish", with Kemal Oflazer. Computer Speech and Language, pp. 80–106, 2006
- Reduplication: Doubling in Morphology, with Cheryl Zoll. Cambridge University Press. 2005. Review.
- "Velar Fronting Revisited", with Yvan Rose, in Barbara Beachley, Amanda Brown & Fran Conlin (eds.), Proceedings of the 26th Annual Boston University Conference on Language Development; Somerville, MA: Cascadilla Press
- "Turkish stress: a review", with C. Orhan Orgun, Phonology 20, pp. 139–161, 2003
- "J's rhymes: a longitudinal case study of language play", Journal of Child Language 30, pp. 557–581, 2003
