= James W. Harris =

American linguist (1932–2024)

James Wesley Harris
- Born: 1932; East Point, GA
- Died: November 10, 2024 (aged 92); Lexington, MA
- Resting place: Baron Hirsch Cemetery
- Education: MIT (PhD)
- Alma mater: University of Georgia, Louisiana State University, Instituto Tecnológico de Estudios Superiores de Monterrey, Universidad Nacional Autónoma de México, Massachusetts Institute of Technology
- Spouse: Florence Warshawsky Harris
- Children: Lynn Harris
- Parents: Charles Wesley Harris (father); Lucy Margaret Crawford Harris (mother)
- Scientific career
- Fields: Linguistics
- Institutions: MIT
- Thesis: (1967)
- Doctoral advisor: Morris Halle
- Notable students: John J. McCarthy

James Wesley Harris (1932 – November 10, 2024) was an American linguist and Emeritus Professor of Spanish & Linguistics at MIT. He was known for his works on Spanish. Harris died on November 10, 2024, at the age of 92.

From his obituary, written by his daughter, Lynn Harris: "During the Korean War, he performed his military service as the clarinet and saxophone instructor at the U.S. Navy School of Music in Washington, D.C. After discharge, he directed the band at the Charlotte Hall Military Academy in Maryland, where he also taught Spanish, French, and Latin.

He received an MA in linguistics from Louisiana State University and a Ph.D. in linguistics from MIT. Having achieved national recognition as an English-Spanish bilingual teacher and teacher-trainer he was engaged as a writer at the Modern Language Materials Development Center in New York. Later, he co-authored, with Guillermo Segreda, a series of popular college-level Spanish textbooks.

He was an MIT faculty member for decades, serving as head of the department then called Foreign Languages and Literatures, eventually retiring as Professor Emeritus of Spanish and Linguistics.

In his early days at MIT, when French, German, and Russian dominated as elite 'languages of science and world literature,' he championed, over some opposition, the introduction of Spanish language and literature courses. He later oversaw inclusion of Japanese and Chinese courses as well. He promoted undergraduate courses in linguistics, leading to a full undergraduate degree program in linguistics—thus broadening the focus of the prestigious Ph.D. program.

His research in linguistics centered on theoretical phonology and morphology. His books, presentations at professional meetings, and articles in peer-reviewed journals were among the most discussed—in both positive and negative assessments, as he says—by prominent scholars in the field. The ability to teach complex technical material comfortably in Spanish plus the status of an MIT professorship resulted in invitations to teach at universities across Spain and Latin America. He was also highly valued as a member of the editorial boards of several professional journals."

From the 2016 festschrift The Syllable and Stress: Studies in Honor of James W. Harris (Ed. Rafael Nuñez): “Jim Harris has guided the work of a generation and more of linguistic scholarship.”

== Books ==
- Syllable Structure and Stress in Spanish: A Nonlinear Analysis. Linguistic Inquiry Monograph 8, Cambridge: MIT Press 1983
