= Lynn Harris =

American feminist entrepreneur

Lynn Harris is an American feminist entrepreneur, journalist, essayist, author, and comedian who lives in Brooklyn, New York. Harris is the founder of GOLD Comedy, the "comedy school, professional network, and content studio where women and non-binary creators build comedy careers and creative side hustles, form a powerful community, and make funny stuff."

She is the former vice president, Communications at Breakthrough, a global human rights organization driving the culture change we need to build a world in which all people live with dignity, equality, and respect. Harris is also co-creator, with Chris Kalb, of the website BreakupGirl.net. She is also a founder of Persisticon, a Brooklyn-based group that organizes comedy and art fundraisers for EMILY's List and other organizations working to elect women.

== GOLD Comedy ==
In early 2016, Harris founded GOLD Comedy.

GOLD Comedy has been featured in numerous news outlets including NY Magazine.

== Writing ==
Harris has been a contributing writer for Salon.com and a contributing editor at Glamour Magazine. Her freelance journalism and essays have appeared in The New York Times, Nerve.com, NPR.org, and The Washington Post. She wrote the "Rabbi's Wife" column for the former Nextbook.org. She is also the dating advice columnist for MSN.com.

Harris' writing focuses on gender, health, politics, relationships, and culture and has inspired large impact. Her essay in Salon on female genital mutilation ("Our Daughters Should Not Be Cut") was a recipient of a 2010 Planned Parenthood Maggie Award for online reporting, and it encouraged U.S. Reps Joseph Crowley and Mary Bono Mack to introduce The Girls' Protection Act to make it a federal crime to transport a minor outside the United States for the purpose of female genital mutilation. "The Hidden World of Dating Violence", her 1996 cover story in PARADE Magazine, broke the term "dating violence" into the mainstream. In the two weeks after the article ran, calls to the National Domestic Violence Hotline doubled. One of Harris' articles for Glamour – "They're Autistic, and They're in Love" - won a Mental Health America Media Award. Another piece for Glamour, "Could You Get Hooked On These Pills?" won a Newswomen's Club of New York Front Page Award.

Harris is also the author of two novels and three nonfiction books. Her most recent title is Death By Chick Lit (2007). The novel's prequel, Miss Media, was published in 2003.

As a mentor-editor with The OpEd Project, Harris works with emerging female op-ed writers, offering feedback needed to improve their work and amplify women's voices in media.

== Breakup Girl ==
Harris is the co-creator, with Chris Kalb, of Breakup Girl, a character that debuted in her 1996 book He Loved Me, He Loves Me Not: A Guide to Fudge, Fury, Free Time, and Life Beyond the Breakup. (Avon) which she wrote and Chris Kalb illustrated. The character expanded into an online presence in 1997. BreakupGirl.net includes an advice column and comics/animations by and about the superhero known as "Breakup Girl" who says her role "is to fight crimes of the heart, stop dating indignities, get your stuff back, help you help your mom through your breakup, and make good relationships great."

The print adventures of Breakup Girl continued in 2000 with Harris' Breakup Girl to the Rescue! A Superhero's Guide to Love, and Lack Thereof (Back Bay Books), which also was illustrated by Chris Kalb.

== Communications and advocacy ==
Harris began her position as Communications Strategist with Breakthrough in March 2011. Breakthrough describes its mission as "a global human rights organization that uses the power of media, pop culture, and community mobilization to inspire people to take bold action for dignity, equality, and justice." It is based in India and the United States, and particularly focuses on gender-based violence, and issues relating to sexuality, HIV/AIDS, immigration, and racial justice.

She is also the former VP of public relations for the Boston chapter of the National Organization for Women (NOW).

== Performance ==
A former stand-up comic, Harris co-wrote and co-starred with Betsy Fast in the Off-Off Broadway production of "Lynn Harris on Ice." Directed by Jim Gaylord, the production was promoted as featuring "cautionary campfire tales about snow sports, skating scandals, dotcom meltdowns, fellas with cold feet, and parents numb with worry." Harris also performed as a standup comic and storyteller for many years, and in her early twenties she was "discovered" as a Tonya Harding look-alike and made numerous TV and radio appearances.

== Early/Personal life ==
Harris was born in 1969 in Lexington, MA. Her parents are the late American linguist James W. Harris (1932-2024), and the late Florence W. Harris (1937-2020), who served as editor on Noam Chomsky and Morris Halle’s extremely influential linguistic work The Sound Pattern of English and numerous other important linguistic texts. Lynn is an only child. She attended the Winsor School in Boston and graduated from Yale University in 1990.

Harris married Rabbi David Adelson, currently the dean of the New York City campus of Hebrew Union College-Jewish Institute of Religion, in 2003. They live in Brooklyn and have two children, Bess and Sam.
