= Florence Warshawsky Harris =

American academic editor and educator

- Born: April 9, 1937; New York City, U.S.
- Died: May 6, 2020; Arlington, Massachusetts, U.S.
- Education: City College of New York; Massachusetts Institute of Technology (graduate study)
- Occupations: Editor, educator
- Spouse: James W. Harris (m. c. 1967–2020)
- Children: Lynn Harris

Florence Warshawsky Harris (April 9, 1937 – May 6, 2020) was an American academic editor. She is best known for her editorial work on landmark works in generative linguistics, most notably as the editor of The Sound Pattern of English (1968) by Noam Chomsky and Morris Halle. She also co-authored, with her husband, James W. Harris, a history of the linguistics program at the Massachusetts Institute of Technology (MIT).

== Early life and education ==
Florence Warshawsky was born in New York City to Chaim and Liba Warshawsky, immigrants from Drobnin, Poland.

She was deeply influenced by her cousin Regina, her family's only relative to survive Auschwitz, who came to live with the Warshawskys after the war.

An academically gifted student, she attended the High School of Music & Art and entered City College of New York at age 15. She later pursued graduate study at MIT, where she is listed as a former student in the linguistics program.

== Career ==
=== Academic editing ===
Harris worked as an editor in academic publishing, specializing in linguistics. Her most celebrated contribution was her work on The Sound Pattern of English (1968), the foundational work in generative phonology by Chomsky and Halle. In the book's acknowledgments, the authors credited her as their "editor and former student, who has devoted a major part of her life during these last two years to seeing our difficult and forever unfinished manuscript through the press." MIT linguist Samuel Jay Keyser later described her as "the miracle worker who copy-edited the seminal and enormous Sound Pattern of English," noting the legend that the text contained at most one undetected typo.

She also copy-edited Keyser and Halle's English Stress: Its Form, Its Growth, and Its Role in Verse, as well as numerous other important linguistic texts.

=== Education and other work ===
Harris authored The Language Book: A Teach & Use Handbook for the Middle Level, an educational resource for middle school language instruction. In 2011, in celebration of the 50th anniversary of MIT's linguistics program, she and her husband James co-authored a detailed history of the program's origins.

== Personal life ==
Florence married linguist James W. Harris, a professor of Spanish and linguistics at MIT, with whom she had one daughter, Lynn Harris.

She died on May 6, 2020, of complications related to COVID-19, at the age of 83.

== Works ==
- Harris, Florence W. The Language Book: A Teach & Use Handbook for the Middle Level.
- Harris, Florence W. and James W. Harris. "The Development of the MIT Linguistics Program." MIT Linguistics, 2011. ling50.mit.edu/harris-development.
