= Paul Kiparsky =

American linguist

René Paul Victor Kiparsky
- Born: January 28, 1941 (age 85); Helsinki
- Education: MIT
- Father: Valentin Kiparsky
- Awards: Alexander von Humboldt Prize (1993); Swedish Academy Prize (2013)
- Scientific career
- Fields: Linguistics
- Workplaces: Stanford University
- Doctoral advisor: Morris Halle
- Doctoral students: Sharon Inkelas

René Paul Victor Kiparsky (born January 28, 1941) is a Finnish linguist and professor of linguistics at Stanford University. He is the son of the St. Petersburg (Russia)-born linguist and Baltist/ Slavicist Valentin Kiparsky.

Kiparsky is especially known for his contributions to phonology. These include coining the terms elsewhere principle, and phonological opacity (including the types feeding, bleeding, counterfeeding, and counterbleeding), and creating the frameworks of Lexical Phonology and Morphology (LPM) and its successor, Stratal Optimality Theory. A noted Pāṇini scholar, he has also made fundamental contributions to historical linguistics and generative metrics, as well as working in morphosyntax, especially on his native Finnish.

== Academic life ==
Kiparsky was born in Helsinki. He studied at Alabama College (now the University of Montevallo), the University of Helsinki and the University of Minnesota. Kiparsky was a student of Morris Halle at MIT, where he received his PhD in 1965. For two decades, from 1965 to 1984, he taught at MIT, and since 1984 he has taught at Stanford University, where he is Bass Professor in the School of Humanities and Sciences. His PhD thesis "Phonological Change" (1965) and his subsequent work on historical linguistics helped form the modern generative view of this area. He has presented an autobiographical account of his scientific and personal life.

He has been awarded honorary doctorates by University of Gothenburg (1985) and the University of Konstanz (2008), and received the Alexander von Humboldt Prize (1993).

In 2011 he was awarded a Senior Fellowship of the Zukunftskolleg at the University of Konstanz.
