= Feature geometry =

Feature geometry is a phonological theory which represents distinctive features as a structured hierarchy rather than a matrix or a set. Feature geometry grew out of autosegmental phonology, which emphasizes the autonomous nature of distinctive features and the non-uniform relationships among them. Feature geometry recognizes that some sets of features often pattern together in phonological and phonotactic generalizations, while others rarely interact. Feature geometry thus formally encodes groups of features under nodes in a tree: features that commonly pattern together are said to share a parent node, and operations on this set can be encoded as operation on the parent node.

One node in feature geometries is the Laryngeal node. The Laryngeal node is an organizing node that dominates the features of the larynx, usually taken to be [voice], [constricted glottis], and [spread glottis]. It is common for these three features to pattern together in the phonology of the world's languages to the exclusion of every other feature, and in feature geometry, this follows from the tree representation. Similarly, feature geometries generally include a Place node that is the dominant node of the place features, which also often pattern together. Feature geometry is easily compatible with theories of underspecification and can represent incomplete segments by missing nodes.

The Root node is the topmost node of the feature tree and works as the formal organizing unit of the segment, and in some frameworks encodes the major class features such as [consonantal], [sonorant], and [approximant]. Some features such as [nasal] and [lateral] are sometimes dependent of the root node, or sometimes of a Supralaryngeal node along with Place. Other features such as [anterior] and [distributed] are usually dependent from the Coronal place feature.

The first formal model of feature geometry was introduced in print by George N. Clements in 1985, drawing on unpublished work by K.P. Mohanan and Joan Mascaró. Another precursor to feature geometry was proposed by Roger Lass in 1976, in which he proposed a laryngeal feature submatrix within a distinctive feature matrix. Other important models have been proposed by Elizabeth Sagey (1986), John J. McCarthy (1988), and Clements & Hume (1995). Models vary widely in the number of the hierarchical nodes and in how consonant and vowel features are treated.

Feature geometry has attracted formal and conceptual criticism. In 2003, Charles Reiss argued that feature geometry is insufficiently powerful to account for a class of phonological rules that involve dependencies between segments, such as partial and total identity and nonidentity. Feature geometry is unable to encode these properties. In 2008, Jeff Mielke argued that feature geometry merely recapitulated physiological organization, and that since the influence of articulation on sound change will independently create patterns in the behavior of features, feature geometry recapitulates diachrony and is redundant as a theory of the mental organisation of phonology.

== Sources ==
- Clements, G. N. & S. J. Keyser, 1983. CV Phonology: a Generative Theory of the Syllable (Linguistic Inquiry Monograph 9), MIT Press, Cambridge, Ma.
- Clements, G. N., 1985. "The Geometry of Phonological Features," Phonology Yearbook 2, 225–252.
- Clements, G. N. & Elizabeth Hume, 1995. "The Internal Organization of Speech Sounds" In John Goldsmith, ed., Handbook of Phonological Theory. Oxford: Basil Blackwell, Oxford, pp. 245–306.
- McCarthy, John J. 1988. "Feature geometry and dependence: A review." Phonetica 43. 84-108.
- Mielke, Jeff. 2008. The Emergence of Distinctive features. Oxford University Press. Chicago
- Reiss, Charles. 2003. "Quantification in structural descriptions: Attested and unattested patterns." Linguistic review, 20(2/4), 305–338.
- Sagey, Elizabeth Caroline, 1986. The representation of features and relations in non-linear phonology. Cambridge, MA: MIT dissertation.
