= Unpacking (linguistics) =

Sound change where one feature separates into two; opposite of fusion

In historical linguistics and language contact, unpacking is the separation of the features of a segment into distinct segments. It is a subtype of transphonologization.

== Examples ==
One of the most common examples of unpacking is the separation of nasal vowels into sequences of a vowel and a nasal consonant when are borrowed into languages that do not have nasal vowels. That can be seen in English borrowings of French and Portuguese words like monsoon [mɒnˈsuːn] from Portuguese monção [mõsɐ̃ũ]; likewise, Lingala [balansi] reflects French [balɑ̃s] "balance". In such examples, the nasality of the vowel is separated out as a nasal consonant; otherwise, the nasality would be lost.

Unpacking occurs also as a sound change within the same language. For example, Classical Armenian changed the Proto-Indo European syllabic sonorants *m̥, *n̥, *r̥, and *l̥ to am, an, ar, and al: this kept the syllabic nature of the sound, while preserving the consonant value. Thus, the privative prefix *n̥- became ան- an-, and the word *mr̥tos became մարդ mard.

== See also ==
- Fusion, the opposite of unpacking
- Vowel breaking
- Transphonologization
