= Fusion (phonetics) =

Type of linguistic sound change

In phonetics and historical linguistics, fusion, or coalescence, is a sound change in which two or more segments with distinctive features merge into a single segment. This can occur both on consonants and in vowels. A word like educate is one that may exhibit fusion: /ˈɛdjʊkeɪt/ or /ˈɛdʒʊkeɪt/. A merger between two segments can also occur between word boundaries, an example being the phrase got ya /ˈɡɒt jə/ being pronounced like gotcha /ˈɡɒtʃə/. Most cases of fusion lead to allophonic variation, but some sequences of segments may lead to wholly-distinct phonemes.

A common form of fusion is found in the development of nasal vowels, which frequently become phonemic when final nasal consonants are lost from a language, as has occurred in French and Portuguese. Compare the French words un vin blanc [œ̃ vɛ̃ blɑ̃] "a white wine" with their English cognates, one, wine, blank, which retain the n sounds.

Often, the resulting sound has the place of articulation of one of the source sounds and the manner of articulation of the other, as in Malay.

Vowel coalescence is extremely common. The resulting vowel is often long. Often, it is between the two original vowels in vowel space, as in [ai] → [eː] → [e] and [au] → [oː] → [o] in French (compare English day [deɪ] and law [lɔː]), in Hindi (with [ɛː], [ɔː]), and in some varieties of Arabic, or it combines features of the vowels, as in [ui] → [yː] → [y] and [oi] → [øː] → [ø].

Compensatory lengthening may be considered an extreme form of fusion.

== Examples ==
=== Indo-European languages ===
==== English ====
Historically, the alveolar plosives and fricatives have fused with /j/ in a process referred to as yod coalescence. Words like nature and omission have had such consonant clusters, being pronounced like /naːˈtiu̯r/ and /ɔˈmisjən/. Words ending in the Latin-derived suffixes -tion and -sion, such as fiction and mission, are examples that exhibit yod coalescence.

The sound change was not, however, distributed evenly. Words like module may be realised as either /ˈmɒdjuːl/ or /ˈmɒdʒuːl/. Words that did not experience universal yod coalescence, are always realised as two segments in accents like Received Pronunciation. They are pronounced as one segment in most other dialects such as American English.

Words with primary stress on a syllable with such a cluster also did not experience coalescence: tune /tjuːn/ and assume /əˈsjuːm/. Some dialects exhibit coalescence in those cases, where some coalesce only /tj/ and /dj/, and others also coalesce /sj/ and /zj/. In General American, /j/ elides entirely after alveolar consonants in a process called yod dropping. The previous examples are then respectively pronounced /tuːn/ and /əˈsuːm/

Australian English exhibits yod coalescence to an extreme degree even when the cluster is in a stressed syllable, but there is some sociolectal variation. In an accent with full yod coalescence, tune and assume are pronounced /tʃuːn/ and /əˈʃuːm/. That can result in homophony between previously-distinct words, as between dune and June, both of which are then pronounced /d͡ʒuːn/.

==== Romance languages ====
Most Romance languages have coalesced sequences of consonants followed by /j/. Sequences of plosives followed by /j/ most often became affricates, often being intermediary stages to other manners of articulation. Sonorants in such a sequence (except bilabial consonants) mostly became palatalized.

==== Greek ====
During the development of Ancient Greek from Proto-Greek, [kʷ], [kʷʰ] and [ɡʷ] became [p], [pʰ] and [b]. Although the labiovelars were already a single consonant, they had two places of articulation: a velar articulation and labial secondary articulation ([ʷ]). However, the development of labiovelars varies from dialect to dialect, and some may have become dental instead. An example is the word boûs "cow" from Proto-Greek *gʷous.

A vowel coalescence from Ancient Greek to Koine Greek fused many diphthongs, especially those including /i̯/: /ai̯/ > /e/; /aːi̯/ > /a/; /ɛːi̯/ and /oi̯/ > /i/ and /ɔːi̯/ > /o/.

==== Celtic languages ====
Several consonant clusters in Proto-Celtic underwent fusion, most prominently /*ɡ/ to the following consonant in coda position. Examples are *ougros > úar and *maglos > mál in Old Irish.

==== North Germanic languages ====
In Norwegian and Swedish, the process occurs whenever the phoneme /ɾ/ is followed by an alveolar consonant. The articulation of the resulting fusion becomes retroflex. Examples include the Norwegian bart [bɑʈ] and Swedish nord [nuːɖ]. That occurs even across word boundaries, as in the sentence går det bra? (is it all right?) becoming /ɡoː‿ɖə brɑː/.

The process continues for as long as there are more alveolar consonants, but when there are four, people usually try to break it up or shorten it, usually by replacing /ʂ/ with /s/, or eliding /d/. An extreme example of this would be the word ordensstraff /ɔ.ɖɳ̩ʂ.ʂʈɽɑfː/, having six retroflex consonants in a row.

In colloquial Norwegian, the sequence /rt/ may even coalesce over non-alveolar phonemes and change their place of articulation to retroflex even if /r/ would normally not trigger that. Examples are sterkt /stæɾkt/ [stæʈː], skarpt /skɑɾpt/ [skɑʈː], verktøy /ʋæɾk.tœʏ̯/ [ʋæʈ.ʈœʏ̯] and varmt /ʋɑɾmt/ [ʋɑɳʈ]. This process does not occur across word boundaries, e.g. sterk tann is pronounced /stæɾk tɑnː/ and not */stæ‿ʈɒnː/

In dialects where /r/ is articulated uvularly, the process invariably takes place by idiolect. For example, /rɑːrt/ may be realised as [ʁɑːʁt] or [ʁɑːʈ]. This may appear in regions where /r/ has recently become uvular.

=== Austronesian languages ===
==== Malay ====
In Malay, the final consonant of the prefix /məN-/ (where N stands for a "placeless nasal", a nasal with no specified place of articulation) coalesces with a voiceless stop at the beginning of the root to which the prefix is attached. The resulting sound is a nasal that has the place of articulation of the root-initial consonant. For example:

- /məN + potoŋ/ becomes /məmotoŋ/ 'cut' ([p] and [m] are both pronounced with the lips)
- /məN + tulis/ becomes /mənulis/ 'write' ([t] and [n] are both pronounced with the tip of the tongue)
- /məN + kira/ becomes /məŋira/ 'guess' ([k] and [ŋ] are both pronounced at the back of the tongue)

=== Japanese ===
Vowel coalescence occurs in Owari Japanese. The diphthongs /ai/ and /ae/ change to [æː], /oi/; /oe/ changes to [øː]; and /ui/ changes to [yː]: 来年 /raineN/ > [ræ:nen], 鯉 /koi/ > [køː], 熱い /atsui/ > [atsyː~atɕːyː]. Younger speakers may vary between Standard Japanese diphthongs and dialectal monophthongs.

== See also ==
- Sandhi, sound changes that occur at morpheme or word boundaries
- Unpacking, the opposite of fusion
- Yod-coalescence

== Sources ==
- Crowley, Terry. (1997) An Introduction to Historical Linguistics. 3rd edition. Oxford University Press.
