= Géraldine Legendre =

French-American cognitive scientist and linguist

- Born: 1953 (age 72–73)
- Education: University of Tours (Licentiate); University of California, San Diego (M.A., Ph.D.)
- Occupations: Cognitive scientist; linguist

Géraldine Legendre (born 1953) is a French-American cognitive scientist and linguist known for her work on French grammar, on mathematical models for the development of syntax in natural languages including harmonic grammar and Optimality Theory, and on universal grammar and innate syntactic ability of humans in natural language. She is a professor of cognitive science at Johns Hopkins University.

== Education and career ==
Legendre studied English literature at the University of Tours, earning a licentiate in 1974. She went to the University of California, San Diego for graduate study, and she completed her M.A. in 1984 and her Ph.D. in 1987. Her dissertation, Topics in French Syntax, was supervised by David M. Perlmutter and Sandra Chung.

She became an assistant professor of linguistics at the University of Colorado Boulder and earned tenure there in 1994. In 1995, she moved to Johns Hopkins University, and in 2000, she was promoted to full professor. She became department chair in 2018.

== Books ==
Legendre is the author of the book Topics in French Syntax (Routledge, 1994) and the coauthor with Paul Smolensky of the two-volume The Harmonic Mind (MIT Press, 2006). She is also a co-editor of edited volumes including Optimality-Theoretic Syntax (MIT Press, 2001) and Optimality-Theoretic Syntax, Semantics, and Pragmatics: From Uni- To Bidirectional Optimization (Oxford University Press, 2016).
