= Diana Archangeli =

American linguist (born 1953)

- Born: 1953 (age 72–73); Oregon, US
- Awards: CASBS fellowship

Academic background
- Education: Massachusetts Institute of Technology (PhD); University of Texas at Austin (MA)
- Thesis: Underspecification in Yawelmani Phonology and Morphology (1984)
- Doctoral advisor: Morris Halle
- Other advisor: S. Jay Keyser James Harris

Academic work
- Discipline: linguistics
- Sub-discipline: morphology, phonetics, phonology
- Institutions: University of Arizona; University of Hong Kong (2013 - 2017)
- Notable ideas: Emergent Phonology
- Website: u.arizona.edu/~dba/index.html

Diana B. Archangeli (born 1953) is an American linguist and Professor at the Department of Linguistics at the University of Arizona.

She earned her B.A. in English and linguistics from Washington State University in 1974, her M.A. in phonology specialization at the University of Texas-Austin in 1981, and her PhD in phonology specialization from MIT in 1984, with a dissertation entitled, "Underspecification in Yawelmani Phonology and Morphology". Her dissertation was selected for publication in Garland's Outstanding Dissertation series (Archangeli 1988).

She taught at the University of Illinois at Urbana-Champaign for a year before joining the faculty at the University of Arizona in 1985. She also spent a few years teaching at the University of Hong Kong (2013-2017).

She is known for a number of widely cited works on phonetics and phonology, often in collaboration with Douglas Pulleyblank (UBC), within the frameworks of Grounded Phonology, Emergent Phonology and underspecification.

== Selected publications ==
=== Books ===
- Archangeli, Diana & Pulleyblank, Douglas. 1994. Grounded Phonology. MIT Press
- Optimality Theory: An Overview, edited with D. T. Langendoen, University of Arizona, 1997, Blackwells Publishing, Oxford
- Underspecification in Yawelmani Phonology and Morphology, 1988, Garland Publishing, New York
- Archangeli, Diana & Pulleyblank, Douglas. 2022. Emergent phonology. (Conceptual Foundations of Language Science 7). Berlin: Language Science Press. DOI: 10.5281/zenodo.5721159
