= John Kingston (linguist) =

American linguist

Academic background
- Education: University of Chicago (BA, MA) University of California, Berkeley (PhD)
- Thesis: The phonetics and phonology of the timing of oral and glottal events (1985)
- Doctoral advisor: John Ohala

Academic work
- Discipline: Linguistics
- Sub-discipline: Phonology, Phonetics
- Institutions: University of Massachusetts Amherst

John Kingston is an American linguist and Professor of Linguistics at University of Massachusetts Amherst. He is a founding member of the Association for Laboratory Phonology, and assisted with the formation of the field of Laboratory Phonology, which seeks to connect the subfields of phonology and phonetics through experimental evidence. He is known for his works on speech perception and its influence on phonological processes.

== See Also ==
- Mary Beckman
- Janet Pierrehumbert
