= Distinctive feature =

Basic unit distinguishing one sound from another in a language

In linguistics, a distinctive feature is the most basic unit of phonological structure that distinguishes one sound from another within a language. For example, the feature [± voice] distinguishes the two bilabial plosives: [p] and [b] (i.e., it makes the two plosives distinct from one another). There are many different ways of defining and arranging features into feature systems: some deal with only one language while others are developed to apply to all languages.

Distinctive features are grouped into categories according to the natural classes of segments they describe: major class features, laryngeal features, manner features, and place features. These feature categories in turn are further specified on the basis of the phonetic properties of the segments in question.

Since the inception of the phonological analysis of distinctive features in the 1950s, features traditionally have been specified by binary values to signify whether a segment is described by the feature; a positive value, [+], denotes the presence of a feature, while a negative value, [−], indicates its absence. In addition, a phoneme may be unmarked with respect to a feature. It is also possible for certain phonemes to have different features across languages. For example, [l] could be classified as a continuant or not in a given language depending on how it patterns with other consonants. After the first distinctive feature theory was created by Russian linguist Roman Jakobson in 1941, it was assumed that the distinctive features are binary and this theory about distinctive features being binary was formally adopted in "Sound Pattern of English" by Noam Chomsky and Morris Halle in 1968. Jakobson saw the binary approach as the best way to make the phoneme inventory shorter and the phonological oppositions are naturally binary.

In recent developments to the theory of distinctive features, phonologists have proposed the existence of single-valued features. These features, called unary, univalent, or privative features, can only describe the classes of segments that are said to possess those features, and not the classes that are without them.

== List ==
Euler diagram showing a typical classification of sounds (in IPA) and their manners of articulation and distinctive features

This section lists and describes distinctive features in linguistics.

=== Major class ===
Major class features: The features that represent the major classes of sounds.

1. [± syllabic] Syllabic segments may function as the nucleus of a syllable, while their counterparts, the [−syll] segments, may not. Except in the case of syllabic consonants, [+syllabic] designates all vowels, while [−syllabic] designates all consonants (including glides).
2. [± consonantal] Consonantal segments are produced with an audible constriction in the vocal tract, such as obstruents, nasals, liquids, and trills. Vowels, glides and laryngeal segments are not consonantal.
3. [± approximant] Approximant segments include vowels, glides, and liquids while excluding nasals and obstruents.
4. [± sonorant] This feature describes the type of oral constriction that can occur in the vocal tract. [+son] designates the vowels and sonorant consonants (namely glides, liquids, and nasals) that are produced without an imbalance of air pressure in the vocal tract that might cause turbulence. [−son] describes the obstruents, articulated with a noticeable turbulence caused by an imbalance of air pressure in the vocal tract.

=== Laryngeal ===
Laryngeal features: The features that specify the glottal states of sounds.

1. [± voice] This feature indicates whether vibration of the vocal folds occurs with the articulation of the segment.
2. [± spread glottis] Used to indicate the aspiration of a segment, this feature denotes the openness of the glottis. For [+sg], the vocal folds are spread apart widely enough for friction to occur; for [−sg], there is not the same friction-inducing spreading.
3. [± constricted glottis] The constricted glottis feature denotes the degree of closure of the glottis. [+cg] implies that the vocal folds are held closely together, enough so that air cannot pass through momentarily, while [−cg] implies the opposite. [+cg] sounds include glottalized, ejective and implosive consonants, as well as the glottal stop.

=== Manner ===
Manner features: The features that specify the manner of articulation.

1. [± continuant] This feature describes the passage of air through the vocal tract. [+cont] segments are produced without any significant obstruction in the tract, allowing air to pass through in a continuous stream. [−cont] segments, on the other hand, have such an obstruction, and so occlude the air flow at some point of articulation.
2. [± nasal] This feature describes the position of the velum. [+nas] segments are produced by lowering the velum so that air can pass through the nasal tract. [−nas] segments conversely are produced with a raised velum, blocking the passage of air from the nasal tract and shunting it to the oral tract.
3. [± strident] The strident feature applies to obstruents only and refers to a type of friction that is noisier than usual. This is caused by high energy white noise.
4. [± lateral] This feature designates the shape and positioning of the tongue with respect to the oral tract. [+lat] segments are produced as the center of the tongue rises to contact the roof of the mouth, thereby blocking air from flowing centrally through the oral tract and instead forcing more lateral flow along the lowered side(s) of the tongue.
5. [± delayed release] This feature distinguishes stops from affricates. Affricates are designated [+del rel]

=== Place ===
Place features: The features that specify the place of articulation.

- [ LABIAL ] Labial segments are articulated with the lips. As consonants, these include bilabial and labiodental consonants.
1. [± round]: [+round] are produced with lip rounding, while [−round] are not.
- [ CORONAL ] Coronal sounds are articulated with the tip and/or blade of the tongue. These include a large number of consonants, which can be made with the tip, blade or underside of the tongue (apical, laminal, or subapical consonant, respectively), making contact with the upper lip (linguolabial), between the teeth (interdental), with the back of the teeth (dental), with the alveolar ridge (alveolar), behind the alveolar ridge (postalveolar), or on or in front of the hard palate ((pre)palatal). With postalveolar sibilants, additional tongue shapes need to be distinguished, i.e. "domed" or slightly palatalized ("hushing" or "palato-alveolar"), palatalized (alveolopalatal), and "closed" ("hissing-hushing").
1. [± anterior]: Anterior segments are articulated with the tip or blade of the tongue at or in front of the alveolar ridge. Dental consonants are [+ant], postalveolar and retroflex ones are [−ant].
2. [± distributed]: For [+dist] segments the tongue is extended for some distance in the mouth. In other words, laminal dental and postalveolar consonants are marked as [+dist] (with wider, more distributed constriction), while apical alveolar and retroflex consonants are [−dist] (with narrower, more concentrated constriction).
- [ DORSAL ] Dorsal sounds are articulated by raising the dorsum of the tongue. Dorsal consonants include palatal, velar and uvular consonants.
1. [± high]: [+high] segments raise the dorsum close to the palate. [−high] segments do not.
2. [± low]: [+low] segments bunch the dorsum to a position low in the mouth.
3. [± back]: [+back] segments are produced with the tongue dorsum bunched and retracted slightly to the back of the mouth. [−back] segments are bunched and extended slightly forward.
- [ LARYNGEAL ] Laryngeal sounds are articulated in the larynx, and can be further split into two regions.
  - [ RADICAL ] Radical sounds are articulated in the pharynx, with either the root of the tongue or the epiglottis. These include pharyngeal and epiglottal consonants.
  1. [± advanced tongue root] (or [± retracted tongue root]): [+ATR] (or [−RTR]) segments advance the root of the tongue. [−ATR] (or [+RTR]) segments bunch the root of the tongue towards the pharyngeal wall and activate the pharyngeal constrictor muscles.
  - [ GLOTTAL ] Purely glottal sounds do not involve the tongue at all and are articulated in the glottis. These are the glottal consonants.

=== Vowel space ===
The vowel space is largely structured around spectrum axes rather than purely binary values. Thus, certain values can be combined.

- Horizontal position:
1. [± front]
2. [± central]
3. [± back]

Near-front segments are thus [+front, +central] and near-back segments [+back, +central].

- Vertical position:
1. [± high]
2. [± mid]
3. [± low]

High-mid segments are thus [+high, +mid] and low-mid segments [+low, +mid].

- Roundedness [± round]:
1. [± protruded]: applies to [+round] segments. [+protruded] segments have protruded (endolabial) rounding, [−protruded] segments have compressed (exolabial) rounding.
2. [± spread]: applies to [−round] segments. [+spread] segments have spread lips, [−spread] segments have neutral lips.
- Tensity [± tense] (or [± lax]): technically a phonological property rather than a phonetic one, though also useful for specifying near-high [+high, −tense] and near-low [+low, −tense] segments.

Laryngoscopic studies by John H. Esling suggest an alternative interpretation that splits [± back]:

1. [± raised], equivalent to [+high, +back] segments in the traditional system.
2. [± retracted], equivalent to [+low, +back] segments in the traditional system.

== Jakobsonian system ==
This system is given by Jakobson & Halle (1971, 3.6, 3.7).

=== Sonority ===
- [± vocalic] vocalic, non-vocalic
- [± consonantal] consonantal, non-consonantal
- [± nasal] nasal, oral
- [± compact] forward-flanged: velar and palatal consonant, wide vowel (high vowels)
- [± diffuse] backward-flanged: labial and coronal, narrow vowel (low vowels)
- [± abrupt]
- [± strident] strident, mellow
- [± checked]

=== Protensity ===
- [± tense]

=== Tonality ===
- [± grave] peripheral consonant, back vowel
- [± acute]
- [± medial] coronal or palatal consonant, front vowel
- [± flat] narrowed slit, wider slit
- [± sharp] widened slit, narrower slit

== Other uses ==
The concept of a distinctive feature matrix to distinguish similar elements is identified with phonology, but there have been at least two efforts to use a distinctive feature matrix in related fields. Close to phonology, and clearly acknowledging its debt to phonology, distinctive features have been used to describe and differentiate handshapes in fingerspelling in American Sign Language. Distinctive features have also been used to distinguish proverbs from other types of language such as slogans, clichés, and aphorisms.

Analogous feature systems are also used throughout Natural Language Processing (NLP). For example, part-of-speech tagging divides words into categories. These include "major" categories such as Noun vs. Verb, but also other dimensions such as person and number, plurality, tense, and others. Some mnemonics for part-of-speech tags conjoin multiple features, such as "NN" for singular noun, vs. "NNS" for plural noun, vs. "NNS$" for plural possessive noun (see Brown Corpus). Others provide more explicit separation of features, even formalizing them via markup such as the Text Encoding Initiative's feature structures. Modern statistical NLP uses vectors of very many features, although many of those features are not formally "distinctive" in the sense described here.

== See also ==
- Feature geometry

== Sources ==
- Chomsky, Noam; Halle, Morris (1968). The Sound Pattern of English. New York: Harper and Row.
- Clements, George N. (1985). "The geometry of phonological features". Phonology Yearbook. 2: 225–252. doi:10.1017/S0952675700000440. S2CID 62237665.
- Flynn, Darin (2006). "Articulator Theory" (PDF). University of Calgary. Archived from the original (PDF) on 2011-01-01.
- Hall, T. A. (2007). "Chapter 13. Segmental features". In de Lacy, Paul (ed.). The Cambridge Handbook of Phonology. Cambridge: Cambridge University Press. pp. 311–334.
- Gussenhoven, Carlos; Jacobs, Haike (2017). Understanding Phonology. Routledge. ISBN 978-1-138-96141-8.
- Jakobson, Roman; Fant, Gunnar; Halle, Morris (1952). Preliminaries to Speech Analysis: the Distinctive Features and their Correlates. Cambridge, Massachusetts: MIT Press.
- Jakobson, Roman; Halle, Morris (1971). Fundamentals of Language. The Hague: Mouton.
