= Charles Reiss =

American linguist

Charles Reiss (/riːs/ REESS) is an American linguistics professor teaching at Concordia University in Montreal.

His contributions to linguistics have been in the area of phonology, historical linguistics, and cognitive science. Along with colleagues Mark Hale, Alan Bale, Kyle Gorman, and Veno Volenec, he is a founder and proponent of Substance-Free Logical Phonology. Substance-freeness relates to the idea that phonetic substance is inaccessible to phonological computation (see paper "Substance abuse and dysfunctionalism"). The Concordia school of substance-free phonology also accepts the generative orthodoxy that phonological features are universal and innate, and that the transduction between phonological representations and phonetics is invariant across languages. The term logical phonology refers to attempts to minimize the ontological commitments of phonological theory by leveraging basic mathematical and logical notions derived, for example, from set theory. Reiss' ideas are well represented in three of his co-authored books, Hale and Reiss (2008), Isac and Reiss (2013), and Bale and Reiss (2018).

He graduated from Swarthmore College (BA) and Harvard University (PhD).

== Selected works ==
- In press. Reiss, Charles. Research methods in armchair linguistics. http://ling.auf.net/lingbuzz/007568 In Oxford Handbook of philosophy of linguistics, ed. Gabriel Dupre, Ryan Nefdt, and Kate Stanton. Oxford University Press
- 2022. Reiss, Charles. Priority union and feature logic in phonology. Linguistic Inquiry 53:199–209
- Reiss, Charles, and Veno Volenec. 2022. Conquer primal fear: Phonological features are innate and substance free. Canadian Journal of Linguistics 67:581–610
- 2022. Grestenberger, Laura, Charles Reiss, Hannes A. Fellner, and Gabriel Z. Pantillon, ed. Ha! Linguistic Studies in Honor of Mark R. Hale. Dr. Ludwig Reichert Verlag
- 2022. Reiss, Charles. Plastics. In Grestenberger et al., 327–330.
- 2021. Reiss, C. Towards a complete Logical Phonology model of intrasegmental changes. Glossa: a journal of general linguistics 6(1): 107. doi: https://doi.org/10.16995/glossa.5886
- 2021. Reiss, Charles, and Veno Volenec. Naturalism, internalism and nativism: <What> the legacy of The Sound Pattern of English <should be>. In Wiley-Blackwell Companion to Chomsky, ed. Nicholas Allott, Terje Lohndal, and Georges Rey. Wiley-Blackwell
- 2020. Volenec, Veno, and Charles Reiss. Formal generative phonology. Radical: A Journal of Phonology 2:1–148
- 2020. Cuerrier, Ana¨ele, and Charles Reiss. Geminates and vowel laxing in Quebec French. In Proceedings of LSRL 47, ed. Irene Vogel, 66–76. John Benjamins
- 2020 Reiss, Charles, and Marc Simpson. Reduplication as projection. Revue roumaine de linguistique (Based on work presented at GLOW.)
- 2019 Reiss, Charles. Introduction: Phonology as mental grammar. Loquens 6:1–2. URL http://loquens.revistas.csic.es/index.php/loquens/article/view/70
- 2019 Bale, Alan, Charles Reiss, and David Ta-Chun Shen. Sets, rules and natural classes: { } vs. [ ]. Loquens 6:e065
- 2019. Volenec, Veno, and Charles Reiss. The intervocalic palatal glide in cognitive phonetics. In Proceedings of the 49th Meeting of the North East Linguistics Society, 255–264
- 2018. Bale, Alan, and Charles Reiss. Phonology: A formal introduction. MIT Press, 2018.
- 2017. Reiss, Charles. 2017a. Contrast is irrelevant in phonology: A simple account of Russian /v/ as /V/. In Samuels (2017), 23–45
- 2017. Reiss, Charles. Substance Free Phonology. In Handbook of Phonological Theory, ed. S.J. Hannahs and Anna Bosch, 425–452. New York: Routledge
- 2017. Volenec, Veno, and Charles Reiss. "Cognitive Phonetics: The Transduction of Distinctive Features at the Phonology-Phonetics Interface." Biolinguistics 11 (2017): 251–294.
- 2014 (estimated). Hale, M., Kissock, M., & Reiss, C. An I-Language Approach to Phonologization and Lexification. Chapter 20. The Oxford Handbook of Historical Phonology. Edited by Patrick Honeybone and Joseph Salmons
- 2013. Isac D., & Reiss, C. 2013. I-language: An Introduction to Linguistics as Cognitive Science, 2nd edition. URL: http://linguistics.concordia.ca/i-language/ Oxford University Press. ISBN 978-0199660179
- 2012. Towards a bottom-up approach to phonological typology. 2012. In Towards a Biolinguistic Understanding of Grammar: Essays on Interfaces, ed. A.M. di Sciullo. John Benjamins. Pages 169–191.
- 2009. Intermodular explanation in cognitive science: An example from phonology. In Pylyshyn Papers, Don Dedrick and Lana Trick, eds. Cambridge, MA: MIT Press. 2009. 17pp.
- 2008. Hale, M., & Reiss, C. (2008),The Phonological Enterprise, Oxford: Oxford University Press
- 2008. I-Language: An Introduction to Linguistics as a Cognitive Science. Oxford University Press.
- 2008. Constraining the Learning Path Without Constraints, or The OCP and NoBanana. In Rules, Constraints and Phonological Phenomena, A. Nevins & B. Vaux, (eds.) Oxford University Press. 2008.
- 2007. Oxford Handbook of Linguistic Interfaces. Oxford University Press.
- 2007. Computing Long-distance Dependencies in Vowel Harmony. In Biolinguistics 1:28-48 (with F. Mailhot).
- 2007. Microvariation, Variation, and the Features of Universal Grammar. Lingua 117.4. 2007. With Mark Hale and Madelyn Kissock.
- 2003. The subset principle in phonology: Why the tabula can't be rasa. In Journal of Linguistics 219–244.
- 2003. Deriving the feature-filling / feature-changing contrast: An application to Hungarian vowel harmony. In Linguistic Inquiry. 199-224
- 2003. Quantification in Structural Descriptions:Attested and Unattested Patterns. In The Linguistic Review 20.
- 2001. L2 Evidence for the Structure of the L1 Lexicon. International Journal of English Studies 1: 219–239.
- 2000. Mark Hale & Charles Reiss. Substance abuse and dysfunctionalism: Current trends in phonology. Linguistic Inquiry 31: 157-169 (2000).
