= Mark Hale =

American linguist

Mark Hale is an American linguistics professor now teaching at Concordia University in Montreal, Quebec, Canada. He studies the methodology of historical linguistics as well as theoretical linguistics, Indo-European and Austronesian linguistics.

He has published numerous scholarly articles and books on his research. Along with colleague Charles Reiss, he is a proponent of substance-free phonology, the idea that phonetic substance is inaccessible to phonological computation.

== Selected publications ==
Hale, M. (2007), Historical linguistics: Theory and method, Oxford, Blackwell

Hale, M., & Reiss, C. (2008),The Phonological Enterprise, Oxford: Oxford University Press

Hale, M., Kissock, M., & Reiss, C. (2014) An I-Language Approach to Phonologization and Lexification. Chapter 20. The Oxford Handbook of Historical Phonology. Edited by Patrick Honeybone and Joseph Salmons

Hale, M. (1998). Diachronic syntax. Syntax, 1(1), 1-18.

Hale, M.,(2004) Neogrammarian Sound Change, Chapter 7 in The Handbook of Historical Linguistics, Edited by: Brian D. Joseph and Richard D. Janda, Blackwell

Mark Hale & Charles Reiss (2000) Substance abuse and dysfunctionalism: Current trends in phonology. Linguistic Inquiry 31: 157–169.
