= Jonathan Kaye (linguist) =

American linguist

Jonathan Kaye (born 1942) studied linguistics at Columbia University under Uriel Weinreich and Robert Austelitz, earning his Ph.D. in 1970. He wrote his thesis on Desano, a South American language he studied through a year of field work in the Amazon.

In 1967 he took up his first teaching position at the University of Toronto. While there he focused his studies on the Ottawa language, an Algonquian language spoken in Wikwemikong, Manitoulin Island, Ontario. In 1974 he spent his sabbatical leave as a visiting professor at McGill University, and in 1975 he accepted a position at the Université du Québec à Montréal. At UQAM he continued his studies on Ottawa and began to focus on the Algonquin language in Lac Simon, Québec as well. As a result of his studies he co-edited the book Linguistic Studies of Native Canada with Eung-Do Cook. Linguistic Studies was published in 1978 by the University of British Columbia Press.

By the early 1980s Kaye's focus moved to West African languages. He was the primary editor of volume 2 of Current Approaches to African Linguistics, printed by Walter de Gruyter publishing house in 1983.

Kaye moved to the School of Oriental and African Studies at the University of London in 1988. It was there he published Phonology: A Cognitive View in 1989, considered to be his seminal work.

In 1999 he moved, this time to the Guangdong University of Foreign Studies. He stayed there until he moved to Girona, Spain in 2001. He left Girona and moved to Gorizia, Italy in August 2008. He is still active in research and PhD supervision. He has recently given courses at the University of Ljubljana and at the University of Nova Gorica. He now lives in Kent, England, and volunteers at numerous local libraries.

2003 saw the publication of Living on the Edge: 28 Papers in Honour of Jonathan Kaye, a book dedicated to his life and work.

== Travels ==
Kaye traveled extensively, studying native languages in the area (Ex. languages of North and South America, the Ivory Coast, Slavic, Semitic, France, and others) and would frequently protest the idea that languages were radically different from one another:

From our point of view as English speakers, a language such as Chinese might seem totally different from our own. In fact, these two languages as well as all other human languages are nearly identical. The differences that seem all important to us are relatively minor. (Jonathan Kaye 1989: 54).
