= Alan Prince =

American linguist (born 1946)

Alan Sanford Prince (born 1946) is a Board of Governors Professor Emeritus of Linguistics at Rutgers University-New Brunswick. Prince, along with Paul Smolensky, developed Optimality Theory, which was originally applied to phonology, but has been extended to other areas of linguistics such as syntax and semantics.

== Biography ==
Prince went to high school in Fairfax, Virginia, got his BA with "great distinction" from McGill University, and received his PhD from MIT in 1975. Before coming to Rutgers, he was a professor of linguistics at Brandeis University and at the University of Massachusetts Amherst. In 2010 Prince was named the Rutgers Board of Governors Professor of Linguistics. He became an Emeritus Professor at Rutgers in 2015 upon his retirement. The "Short 'schrift for Alan Prince" was assembled for this occasion, and presented to him at the 2015 Rutgers Typology Workshop.

Prince is married to Jane Grimshaw, who is a Distinguished Professor of Linguistics at Rutgers University.

== Awards ==
In 1998, Prince was named a fellow of the John Simon Guggenheim Memorial Foundation.

== Key Publications ==
- Liberman, Mark; Prince, Alan (1977). "On stress and linguistic rhythm". Linguistic Inquiry. 8 (2): 249–336. JSTOR 4177987.
- McCarthy, John J.; Prince, Alan (1993). "Generalized alignment". In Booij, G.; Van Marle, J. (eds.). Yearbook of Morphology 1993. Springer. pp. 79–153. doi:10.1007/978-94-017-3712-8_4. ISBN 978-94-017-3712-8.
- McCarthy, John J.; Prince, Alan (1995). "Faithfulness and reduplicative identity". Papers in Optimality Theory. University of Massachusetts Occasional Papers in Linguistics. 18: 249–384.
- Pinker, Steven; Prince, Alan (March 1988). "On language and connectionism: Analysis of a parallel distributed processing model of language acquisition". Cognition. 28 (1–2): 73–193. doi:10.1016/0010-0277(88)90032-7. PMID 2450717. S2CID 12217058.
- Prince, Alan S. (1983). "Relating to the grid". Linguistic Inquiry. 14 (1): 19–100. JSTOR 4178311.
- Prince, Alan; Smolensky, Paul (2008) [1993]. Optimality Theory: Constraint interaction in generative grammar. Wiley. ISBN 978-0-470-75939-4.
