= Phonology =

Study of sound organization in languages

Phonology (formerly also phonemics or phonematics) (Note: Depending on usage, there may or may not be a distinction between phonology and phonemics or phonematics, the latter of which are more strictly about segments (consonants and vowels) rather than suprasegmentals (syllables, length, accent, tone, intonation, etc.). Synonymy between these terms is favored by some American structuralist phonologists (or rather, phonemicists) and is reflected in morphophonology/morphophonemics, among other derivatives.) is the branch of linguistics that concerns how languages organize the foundational elements that make their words. In spoken languages, these are phonemes like vowel and consonant sounds that affect meaning. Examples of this effect can be found in comparisons of English words like bat and gnat. In sign languages, these are components of signs such as hand shape and location. Examples can be found in comparisons of American Sign Language signs glossed as CAR and WHICH (hand shape contrasts) and APPLE and ONION (location contrasts). At one time, the study of phonology related only to the study of the systems of phonemes in spoken languages, but now it may relate to any linguistic analysis either:

1. at a level beneath the word (including syllable, onset and rime, articulatory gestures, articulatory features, mora, etc.), or
2. all levels of language in which sound or signs are structured to convey linguistic meaning.

== Terminology ==
The word "phonology" (as in "phonology of English") can refer either to the field of study or to the phonological system of a given language. This is one of the fundamental systems that a language is considered to comprise, like its syntax, its morphology and its lexicon. The word phonology comes from Ancient Greek φωνή, phōnḗ, 'voice, sound', and the suffix -logy (which is from Greek λόγος, lógos, 'word, speech, subject of discussion').

Phonology is typically distinguished from phonetics, which concerns the physical production, acoustic transmission and perception of the sounds or signs of language. Phonology describes the way they function within a given language or across languages to encode meaning. For many linguists, phonetics belongs to descriptive linguistics and phonology to theoretical linguistics, but establishing the phonological system of a language is necessarily an application of theoretical principles to analysis of phonetic evidence in some theories. The distinction was not always made, particularly before the development of the modern concept of the phoneme in the mid-20th century. Some subfields of modern phonology have a crossover with phonetics in descriptive disciplines such as psycholinguistics and speech perception, which result in specific areas like articulatory phonology or laboratory phonology.

Definitions of the field of phonology vary. Nikolai Trubetzkoy in Grundzüge der Phonologie (1939) defines phonology as "the study of sound pertaining to the system of language," as opposed to phonetics, which is "the study of sound pertaining to the act of speech" (the distinction between language and speech being basically Ferdinand de Saussure's distinction between langue and parole). More recently, Lass (1998) writes that phonology refers broadly to the subdiscipline of linguistics concerned with the sounds of language, and in more narrow terms, "phonology proper is concerned with the function, behavior and organization of sounds as linguistic items." According to Clark et al. (2007), it means the systematic use of sound to encode meaning in any spoken human language, or the field of linguistics studying that use.

== History ==
Evidence for a systematic investigation of the sounds of a language appears in the 4th c. BCE Ashtadhyayi, a Sanskrit grammar by Pāṇini. Particularly, within the Shiva Sutras, auxiliary work to the Ashtadhyayi, an inventory of what would be construed as a list of the phonemes of Sanskrit is provided, with a notational scheme for them which is deployed throughout the main text, which concerns itself with issues of morphology, syntax and semantics.

Ibn Jinni of Mosul, a pioneer in phonology, wrote prolifically in the 10th century on Arabic morphology and phonology in works such as Kitāb Al-Munṣif, Kitāb Al-Muḥtasab, and Kitāb Al-Khaṣāʾiṣ.

The study of phonology as it exists today is defined by the formative studies of the 19th-century Polish scholar Jan Baudouin de Courtenay, who (together with his students Mikołaj Kruszewski and Lev Shcherba in the Kazan School) shaped the modern usage of the term phoneme in a series of lectures in 1876–1877. The word phoneme had been coined a few years earlier, in 1873, by the French linguist A. Dufriche-Desgenettes. In a paper read at 24 May meeting of the Société de Linguistique de Paris, Dufriche-Desgenettes proposed for phoneme to serve as a one-word equivalent for the German Sprachlaut. Baudouin de Courtenay's subsequent work, though often unacknowledged, is considered to be the starting point of modern phonology. He also worked on the theory of phonetic alternations (what is now called allophony and morphophonology) and may have had an influence on the work of Saussure, according to E. F. K. Koerner.

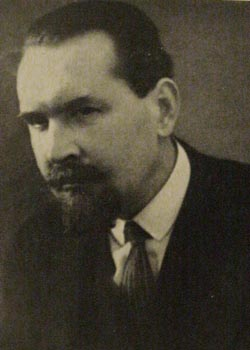
Nikolai Trubetzkoy, 1920s

An influential school of phonology in the interwar period was the Prague school. One of its leading members was Prince Nikolai Trubetzkoy, whose Grundzüge der Phonologie (Principles of Phonology), published posthumously in 1939, is among the most important works in the field from that period. Directly influenced by Baudouin de Courtenay, Trubetzkoy is considered the founder of morphophonology, but the concept had also been recognized by de Courtenay. Trubetzkoy also developed the concept of the archiphoneme. Another important figure in the Prague school was Roman Jakobson, one of the most prominent linguists of the 20th century. Louis Hjelmslev's glossematics also contributed with a focus on linguistic structure independent of phonetic realization or semantics.

In 1968, Noam Chomsky and Morris Halle published The Sound Pattern of English (SPE), the basis for generative phonology. In that view, phonological representations are sequences of segments made up of distinctive features. The features were an expansion of earlier work by Roman Jakobson, Gunnar Fant, and Morris Halle. The features describe aspects of articulation and perception, are from a universally fixed set and have the binary values + or −. There are at least two levels of representation: underlying representation and surface phonetic representation. Ordered phonological rules govern how underlying representation is transformed into the actual pronunciation (the so-called surface form). An important consequence of the influence SPE had on phonological theory was the downplaying of the syllable and the emphasis on segments. Furthermore, the generativists folded morphophonology into phonology, which both solved and created problems.

Natural phonology is a theory based on the publications of its proponent David Stampe in 1969 and, more explicitly, in 1979. In this view, phonology is based on a set of universal phonological processes that interact with one another; those that are active and those that are suppressed is language-specific. Rather than acting on segments, phonological processes act on distinctive features within prosodic groups. Prosodic groups can be as small as a part of a syllable or as large as an entire utterance. Phonological processes are unordered with respect to each other and apply simultaneously, but the output of one process may be the input to another. The second most prominent natural phonologist is Patricia Donegan, Stampe's wife; there are many natural phonologists in Europe and a few in the US, such as Geoffrey Nathan. The principles of natural phonology were extended to morphology by Wolfgang U. Dressler, who founded natural morphology.

In 1976, John Goldsmith introduced autosegmental phonology. Phonological phenomena are no longer seen as operating on one linear sequence of segments, called phonemes or feature combinations but rather as involving some parallel sequences of features that reside on multiple tiers. Autosegmental phonology later evolved into feature geometry, which became the standard theory of representation for theories of the organization of phonology as different as lexical phonology and optimality theory.

Government phonology, which originated in the early 1980s as an attempt to unify theoretical notions of syntactic and phonological structures, is based on the notion that all languages necessarily follow a small set of principles and vary according to their selection of certain binary parameters. That is, all languages' phonological structures are essentially the same, but there is restricted variation that accounts for differences in surface realizations. Principles are held to be inviolable, but parameters may sometimes come into conflict. Prominent figures in this field include Jonathan Kaye, Jean Lowenstamm, Jean-Roger Vergnaud, Monik Charette, and John Harris.

In a course at the LSA summer institute in 1991, Alan Prince and Paul Smolensky developed optimality theory, an overall architecture for phonology according to which languages choose a pronunciation of a word that best satisfies a list of constraints ordered by importance; a lower-ranked constraint can be violated when the violation is necessary in order to obey a higher-ranked constraint. The approach was soon extended to morphology by John McCarthy and Alan Prince and has become a dominant trend in phonology. The appeal to phonetic grounding of constraints and representational elements (e.g. features) in various approaches has been criticized by proponents of "substance-free phonology", especially by Mark Hale and Charles Reiss.

An integrated approach to phonological theory that combines synchronic and diachronic accounts to sound patterns was initiated with Evolutionary Phonology in recent years.

== Analysis of phonemes ==
An important part of traditional, pre-generative schools of phonology is studying which sounds can be grouped into distinctive units within a language; these units are known as phonemes. For example, in English, the "p" sound in pot is aspirated (pronounced [pʰ]) while that in spot is not aspirated (pronounced [p]). However, English speakers intuitively treat both sounds as variations (allophones, which cannot give origin to minimal pairs) of the same phonological category, that is of the phoneme /p/. (Traditionally, it would be argued that if an aspirated [pʰ] were interchanged with the unaspirated [p] in spot, native speakers of English would still hear the same words; that is, the two sounds are perceived as "the same" /p/.) In some other languages, however, these two sounds are perceived as different, and they are consequently assigned to different phonemes. For example, in Thai, Bengali, and Quechua, there are minimal pairs of words for which aspiration is the only contrasting feature (two words can have different meanings but with the only difference in pronunciation being that one has an aspirated sound where the other has an unaspirated one).

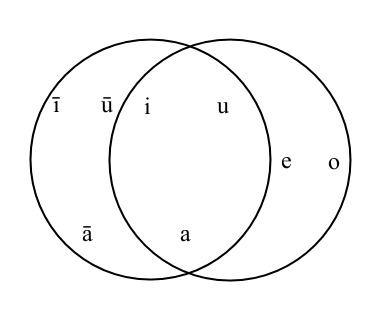
The vowels of modern (Standard) Arabic (left) and (Israeli) Hebrew (right) from the phonemic point of view. Note the intersection of the two circles—the distinction between short a, i and u is made by both speakers, but Arabic lacks the mid articulation of short vowels, while Hebrew lacks the distinction of vowel length.

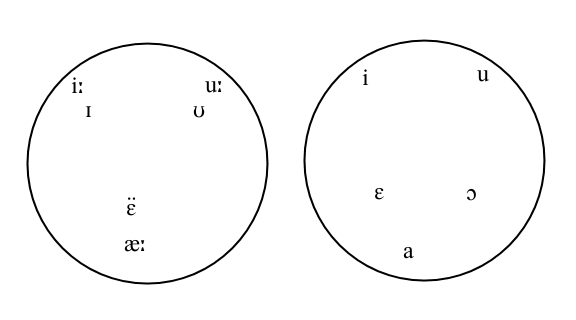
The vowels of modern (Standard) Arabic and (Israeli) Hebrew from the phonetic point of view. The two circles are totally separate—none of the vowel-sounds made by speakers of one language is made by speakers of the other.

Part of the phonological study of a language therefore involves looking at data (phonetic transcriptions of the speech of native speakers) and trying to deduce what the underlying phonemes are and what the sound inventory of the language is. The presence or absence of minimal pairs, as mentioned above, is a frequently used criterion for deciding whether two sounds should be assigned to the same phoneme. However, other considerations often need to be taken into account as well.

The particular contrasts which are phonemic in a language can change over time. At one time, [f] and [v], two sounds that have the same place and manner of articulation and differ in voicing only, were allophones of the same phoneme in English, but later came to belong to separate phonemes. This is one of the main factors of historical change of languages as described in historical linguistics.

The findings and insights of speech perception and articulation research complicate the traditional and somewhat intuitive idea of interchangeable allophones being perceived as the same phoneme. First, interchanged allophones of the same phoneme can result in unrecognizable words. Second, actual speech, even at a word level, is highly co-articulated, so it is problematic to expect to be able to splice words into simple segments without affecting speech perception.

Different linguists therefore take different approaches to the problem of assigning sounds to phonemes. For example, they differ in the extent to which they require allophones to be phonetically similar. There are also differing ideas as to whether this grouping of sounds is purely a tool for linguistic analysis, or reflects an actual process in the way the human brain processes a language.

Since the early 1960s, theoretical linguists have moved away from the traditional concept of a phoneme, preferring to consider basic units at a more abstract level, as a component of morphemes; these units can be called morphophonemes, and analysis using this approach is called morphophonology.

== Other topics ==
In addition to the minimal units that can serve the purpose of differentiating meaning (the phonemes), phonology studies how sounds alternate, or replace one another in different forms of the same morpheme (allomorphs), as well as, for example, syllable structure, stress, feature geometry, tone, and intonation.

Phonology also includes topics such as phonotactics (the phonological constraints on what sounds can appear in what positions in a given language) and phonological alternation (how the pronunciation of a sound changes through the application of phonological rules, sometimes in a given order that can be feeding or bleeding,) as well as prosody, the study of suprasegmentals and topics such as stress and intonation.

The principles of phonological analysis can be applied independently of modality because they are designed to serve as general analytical tools, not language-specific ones. The same principles have been applied to the analysis of sign languages (see Phonemes in sign languages), even though the sublexical units are not instantiated as speech sounds.

== See also ==
- Absolute neutralisation
- Accent (sociolinguistics) – Distinctive way of pronouncing a language
- Cherology
- English phonology – Phonology of the English language
- List of phonologists
- Neogrammarian – School of linguistic thought
- Phonological development – Acquisition of language skills during childhood
- Phonological hierarchy – Size hierarchy of phonological units
- Second language phonology
