= Havet =

Havet is a French-language surname. Notable people with the surname include:

- Armand Havet (1795–1820), French botanist
- Eugène Auguste Ernest Havet (1813–1889), French scholar
- Louis Havet (1849–1925), French classicist
- Mireille Havet (1898–1932), French poet, diarist, novelist, and lyricist
