= Kazan school =

Russian school of linguistics

The Kazan school, or the Kazan Linguistic Circle, was a late-19th-century school of linguistics in Kazan, Russia, founded by the Polish linguists Jan Baudouin de Courtenay and Mikołaj Kruszewski. The Kazan school began when Kruszewski arrived at Kazan Imperial University to study as a graduate student under Baoudoin de Courtenay in 1878, and lasted until Baoudouin de Courtenay's departure for Tartu in 1883 and the death of Kruszewski in 1887. As part of the Kazan school, Kruszewski is held to have been the first to formulate the concept of the phoneme in a synchronic context, which was part of a broader theory of alternations. In phonology, the Kazan school distinguished between the concepts of anthropophonics (relating to the physical aspects of speech) and psychophonetics (relating the psychological aspects of speech), which has been considered to prefigure aspects of generative phonology, which became dominant during the mid-20th century.

Other notable linguists of the Kazan Linguistic Circle included the linguist Vasily Bogoroditsky and the Turkologist Wilhelm Radloff, who remained in Kazan after the departure of Baudouin and the death of Kruszewski. The Kazan school also influenced the Russian linguists Roman Jakobson and Nikolai Trubetzkoy, who eventually formed the Prague linguistic circle, and the Polish Indo-Europeanist Jerzy Kuryłowicz. The views of the Kazan school have been frequently compared with those of Swiss linguist Ferdinand de Saussure, who corresponded with the Kazan school and was significantly better known than the Kazan school in the development of linguistics in Western Europe and the United States.

== Background ==
=== Jan Baudouin de Courtenay ===
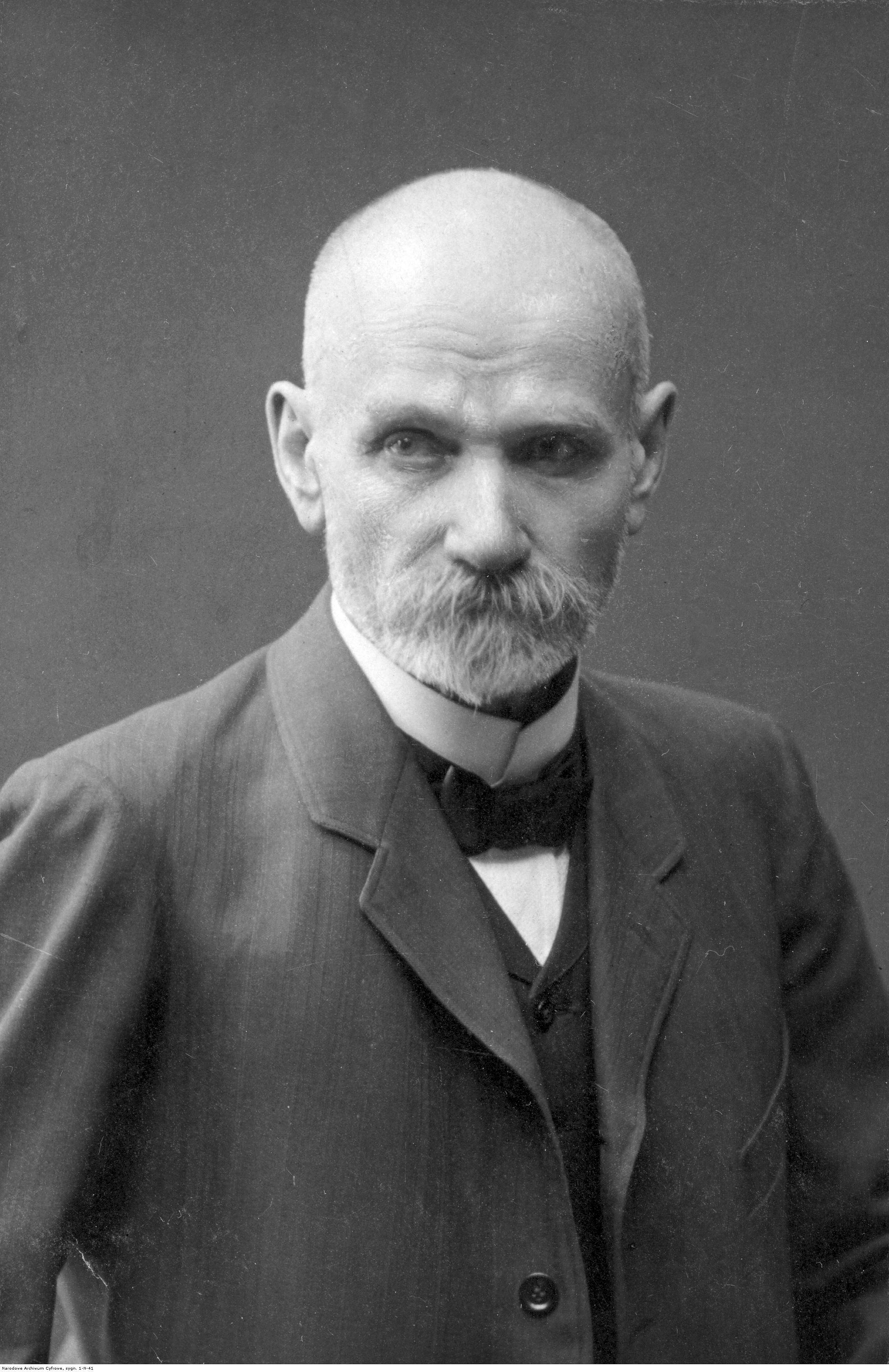
Baudouin de Courtenay

Although Baudouin's family descended from the French aristocracy, they had lived in Poland for several generations when Baudouin was born in 1845 (in Radzymin, near Warsaw). Baudouin felt a great loyalty to Polish cultural and political ideals throughout his career, even though much of his life was spent outside Poland. After finishing the gymnasium, he began university studies in Warsaw, where he received a master of arts degree from the historical-philological faculty in 1866. Like Ferdinand de Saussure, he spent a number of years studying under various prominent Indo-Europeanists of the day, including August Schleicher, August Leskien, Karl Brugmann, and Berthold Delbrück. In 1870, he received a doctorate from Leipzig for work on the nature of analogy, as well as a second master's degree from Saint Petersburg for a study of fourteenth-century Old Polish.

His supervisor in Saint Petersburg, Izmail Sreznevsky, arranged a position for him there as docent (assistant professor) of comparative grammar beginning in 1870. In 1872, he did field work on Slovenian dialects in Austria and northern Italy. When it was published in 1875, his study of the phonetic systems of some of these dialects earned him a Russian doctorate. However, his political views and contemptuous attitude toward Srzenevsky prevented him from staying in Saint Petersburg after his initial appointment. In 1875, he went to Kazan as an assistant professor, obtaining full professorship after a year.

As a provincial city in central Russia, Kazan was isolated from the rest of the academic world. Baudouin did not enjoy the working conditions of Kazan. Nonetheless, it has sometimes been suggested that this isolation had a liberating and ultimately beneficial effect on his scholarship: if work appearing in Kazan was unlikely to be heard of in the intellectual circles of western Europe, it was correspondingly free of the pressures exerted by the dominant influences in those circles.

It was during his years in Kazan that Baudouin was most productive in general linguistics. The arrival of Mikolaj Kruszewski resulted in the formation of the Kazan Linguistic Circle as a forum for the discussion of current linguistic work, and Baudouin quickly developed a very close working relationship with him.

=== Mikołaj Kruszewski ===
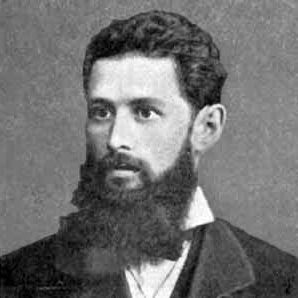
Mikołaj Kruszewki

Kruszewski was born in Poland in 1851. Like Baudouin, he studied in the historical-philological faculty in Warsaw, but spent most of his time there reading philosophy and psychology. He was particularly well trained in English philosophical logic, which is reflected by the later development of his thought on linguistic matters. After submitting an MA thesis in 1875 on a folkloristic topic, he wanted to continue his studies in linguistics, but was financially unable to do so. He had to spend several years teaching Russian language and literature to the daughters of the provincial nobility before he could take the suggestion of one of his advisers to go to Kazan in order to study with Baudouin.

After corresponding with Baudouin for some time and announcing his interest in developing a genuinely scientific foundation for linguistics, he arrived in Kazan in 1878 and immediately became an active participant in Baudouin's program of research and teaching. He was awarded a master's degree in 1881 for his thesis on Old Church Slavonic, a work which contained a substantial systematic chapter on the theory of alternations and which Baudouin praised extravagantly in a published review. His 1883 Outline of Linguistic Science earned him a doctorate.

== Contributions to linguistics ==
From his inaugural lecture at Saint Petersburg, Baudouin establishes major differences of emphasis between his approach to the study of language and that of others. Baudouin suggests that the science of language must seek to understand the laws and forces that govern the nature and development of its object. For Baudouin, if the study of linguistic history—the major preoccupation of his contemporaries—is to go beyond the mere establishment and recording of historical facts and become genuinely explanatory, it must be based on an understanding of the synchronic nature of linguistic systems. Baudoin gives two major reasons for this necessity, one practical and the other a matter of basic principle.

On the one hand, it is living languages that are directly available for study: prior stages of linguistic history can be known only inferentially or, at best, through written records, which constitute only an indirect representation of a language, and not an actual language itself. Living languages must thus have basic priority as evidence for "the forces operating in language, and for the laws that govern its development, its life". While Baudouin criticizes the descriptive, empirical study of languages for its own sake, he also stresses that a thorough knowledge of living languages is an essential preliminary to any attempt at theorizing and explanation.

On the other hand, it is in the forces that govern synchronic systems that the underlying principles leading to historical change are found. Therefore, Baudouin advocates giving priority to the search for the general laws that govern the systems of living languages. This emphasis was particularly appealing to Kruszewski, whose arrival in Kazan contributed greatly to the stress put on such matters in Baudouin's work from that point on. Kruszewski hoped to be able to formulate a small number of fundamental laws of the nature of language, which would have a deductive, explanatory scope similar to that attributed to the "principle of association" in psychology.

Kruszewski's approach to the synchronic structure of language was based on his earlier readings in philosophy, and particularly on his acquaintance with the English tradition of philosophical logic and psychology of scholars such as Francis Bacon, David Hume, John Locke, and John Stuart Mill. On the basis of such typical positions as the attempt to reduce causality to "constant conjunction", these writers held out the hope that many philosophically important problems could ultimately be analyzed in terms of psychological notions, particularly the sorts of associations important to contemporary conceptions of the structure of the mind.

In his theoretical work, Kruszewski presents the nature of language as ultimately a network of two sorts of associations between linguistic forms: associations based on simultaneity, or parallelism of structure, and associations based on sequence, or frequent juxtaposition in larger structures. On the basis of such relations of simultaneity or sequence, words form families; these are also called nests, since the relation of one word to another results in further layers of relationship between the first word and others to which the second is, in its turn, related. In Kruszewski's theory, such a system of relational networks among forms is the structural basis of a language, and knowledge of such a system of similarities of morphological structure and contiguous combinability constitutes "knowledge of the language".

=== The nature of phonological structure ===
Baudouin distinguishes two aspects of the study of synchronic language systems: the physical and the psychological. In the particular domain of sound structure, the study of "the purely physical aspect of language" (now known as phonetics) is called anthropophonics. This is the analysis of sounds from the physiological or acoustic point of view. Anthropophonics involves questions which could, in principle, be posed directly by physiologists or physicists, who have no particular interest in language and speech, though these disciplines generally do not investigate the specific questions of interest to linguists. The other, nonphysical side of the sound system of language is dealt with by psychophonetics. This has as its object "the feeling for the language of a given speech community", and treats a language as a particular system of sound/meaning associations that are related to one another in particular ways. In principle, psychophonetics is related to general psychology in much the same way anthropophonics is related to physics and physiology, but again the specific questions that are of interest to the linguist are to be studied in detail by psychologists.

The main attention in their studies of 'psychophonetics' during this period was given to a phenomenon rooted in historical considerations. They observed that through the operation of phonetic changes in various forms, what was etymologically a single sound type might (in later historical stages of the language) come to be represented differently in different environments. When these different environments occur in related words, or in related forms of the same word, the result may be that the sound differences in question can come to serve as one of the factors—or even the sole factor—separating morphologically distinct yet related forms from one another.

For example, in the history of English, the (originally purely mechanical) factors leading to the voicing of fricatives obtained in some denominal verbs but not in the corresponding nouns from which they were derived. Although subsequent changes eliminated other differences between the nouns and the verbs, the voicing distinction in final fricative consonants remained to differentiate such pairs as cloth/clothe, house([hau̯s])/house([hau̯z]), calf/calve, and others. In this way, an original purely anthropophonic difference has taken on psychophonetic value.

=== The phoneme ===
Kruszewski was the first to introduce the term phoneme in Kazan, having borrowed it from Saussure, who used the term phoneme as an equivalent for the phonetic notion of "speech sound". Kruszewski took the notion of phoneme not from Saussure's work on general linguistics, which did not exist in 1880, but rather from his earlier work on Indo-European, specifically from the Mémoire. Saussure's use of phonème in that work referred to a historical unit: a hypothesized sound in the protolanguage ancestral to a given language family, together with its reflexes in each of the daughter languages. A "phoneme" understood in this way is essentially an individual correspondence set, as one would identify these in the course of a historical investigation. If a single sound undergoes various sound changes in various environments, the resulting sounds remain members of the same phoneme' in this sense, regardless of how much they may diverge phonetically.

Kruszewski took over this notion and recast it in synchronic terms, as with Saussure's usage, to a unit established by systematic comparison, but this time within a single language rather than across a family. In comparing instances of the same morphological unit in different words or families of words, one may find an alternation among distinct but anthropophonically related sounds: sounds that are related historically but no longer identical, being linked by the morphological relation between associated categories. This is the basis of a phoneme in a new sense: a set of alternating sounds occupying parallel positions within the same morphological unit in different families of words.

Although he asserted that this notion was essential to any scientific study of phonetics and morphology, Kruszewski did not immediately develop it further. He considered each alternation a distinct phoneme in a synchronic system; that is, the phonemes each consist of a set of alternating anthropophonic elements together with the conditions for the alternation. In this view, a sound may belong to several different phonemes if it happens to participate in several different alternations. For example, in a language like German, in which final consonants are systematically devoiced, to express the fact that the forms Bund [bunt] 'association' and Bunde [bundə] 'associations' contain the same morphological element, one says that this element consists of the sequence [b], [u], [n], and a unitary "phoneme" {[t] finally, [d] before a vowel}.

=== Kruszewski's theory of alternations ===
After citing the general phenomenon of alternations among anthropophonically distinct sounds and introducing the word phoneme as a way of referring to the unity of sounds involved in an alternation, the bulk of Kruszewski's discussion centers on the classification of alternations into three types. There are two factors in any alternation: the sounds that alternate, and the conditions under which each one occurs. On these bases, alternations may differ from each other and be classified in a variety of ways. Kruszewski’s typology includes three basic categories.

Alternations of the first category meet four conditions:

- The cause of the alternation is directly determinate and immediately present, in the sense that the conditioning factors for the appearance of each of the alternating sounds can be identified in the environment. In the terms of contemporary phonology, this is the requirement that alternations of this category be fully transparent.
- The alternation must be general, being insensitive to the morphological category of the words in which it occurs. This is the requirement that first category alternations be phonologically and not morphologically conditioned.
- The alternations must be "necessary" in that they have no exceptions and there are no cases in which one of the alternating sounds occurs under conditions which should require another.
- The alternation involve sounds that are close to one another anthropophonically, i.e. sounds that differ from one another in only a limited number of phonetic properties.

Alternations of this category include a number of distinguishable types, although Kruszewski does not further differentiate them. They include all of what is usually classified as "subphonemic" or "nondistinctive" variation, such as the distribution of vowel length in English as a function of the following consonant, or the alternation between [i] and [ɨ] in Russian as a function of the palatalization of a preceding consonant. They also include cases in which otherwise distinctive segments alternate with one another, so long as the conditions for the alternation are transparent, phonological, and exceptionless: an example would be the alternation produced by syllable-final de-voicing of obstruents in German, or the reduction of [o] to [ɐ] in pre-stress syllables in Russian. Though Kruszewski's own examples include only cases of the latter sort, linguist Jurgen Klausenburger suggests that his definition and his intention apply to subphonemic variation as well. He does not attach any importance to the question of whether the alternating sounds are independently distinctive (separate "phonemes" in later, structuralist terms) or not (merely separate "allophones" of the same structuralist phoneme). Sounds related by such an alternation are called divergents, and the alternation itself a divergence, using terminology introduced at about the same time by Baudouin.

Kruszewski's criteria for classifying an alternation as belonging to the first category are not taxonomic, in the sense of establishing a standard nomenclature; rather, they are intended to make a substantive claim about the range of possible alternations. He claims that since all of the properties are inseparable, it is only necessary to establish one of the first three criteria in order to determine that an alternation belongs to this category. He does observe that the fourth criterion (phonetic similarity) is only a necessary one, and not sufficient, since alternations belonging to other categories may meet it as well. This contrasts with the first three conditions, which are both necessary and sufficient, such that any one of these is decisive for determining that an alternation belongs to the first category.

Sounds related by an alternation of the first category, or divergents, are considered by Kruszewski to be variants of the same sound, as opposed to those related by alternations of the second or third category. The different sounds that participate in alternations of the latter two types are called correlatives, and the two are similar to each other compared to divergences. Three general conditions are said to be applicable to an alternation of either the second or the third category:

- It is impossible to determine directly the causes of such an alternation, which may be absent in particular forms. These "causes" are the anthropophonic factors which provoke processes such as assimilation or dissimilation. While the causes of a divergence are always present in the form itself, since such an alternation must be transparently phonetically conditioned, those of a correlation may be discoverable only through historical analysis, or even completely absent in particular cases (for instance, when a form is subject to an alternation as a result of analogical restructuring).
- An alternation of correlatives is not necessary, since either correlative may occur (in some forms) under the conditions appropriate to the other. The phonological conditions one might associate with an alternation between correlatives are in principle violable in particular cases under nontransparent or morphological conditions.
- Alternations among correlatives may involve more remote anthropophonic relationships (i.e., differences in a larger number of phonetic properties) than those among divergents.

The difference between alternations of the second and third categories is essentially a matter of how completely an alternation is morphologized. An alternation of the second category may show partial dependence on morphological and nontransparent phonological factors. For instance, Icelandic u-umlaut is an alternation between a and ö. The vowel ö occurs when the vowel of the following syllable is u, but this alternation cannot be a divergence because:

- it is not transparent, since some instances of surface u are epenthetic and do not cause umlaut (e.g. hattur 'hat')
- it is not completely phonological, since ö occurs in certain morphological categories without a following u (e.g., barn 'child', but börn 'children').

The alternation would only be said to belong to the third category if it were completely linked to morphological categories: thus, German umlaut cannot be regarded as phonologically conditioned in any of its occurrences in the modern language, but only takes place in conjunction with a specified range of morphological categories. Under these conditions, however, an alternation of the third category is said to be obligatory, while one of the second category may not be obligatory even under those morphological conditions that can trigger it.

== End ==
In 1883, a chair of comparative Slavic grammar was established in Tartu, Estonia, a location which Baudouin found much more appealing than Kazan and to which he immediately moved. Kruszewski succeeded Baudouin briefly in the chair of Indo-European comparative grammar in Kazan, but in 1884, Kruszewski fell ill of a progressive degenerative neurological disorder, likely as a complication of syphilis. By 1886, he was too ill to continue working, and died in the following year.

Baudouin, in turn, became professor of comparative linguistics and Sanskrit in Kraków in 1893, a position which satisfied him, since it was in Poland. His pro-Polish feelings, however, proved undesirable to the Austro-Hungarian authorities of the city. Since Baudouin did not enjoy the equivalent of modern academic tenure, his contract was simply not renewed after five years, and he was forced to return to Saint Petersburg. Here too he got into political difficulties, this time through his attacks on the tsarist suppression of national minorities, and he eventually spent some months in jail. Freed at the outbreak of World War I, he taught again briefly in Saint Petersburg until he was invited to the chair of Indo-European linguistics at the University of Warsaw in the reestablished independent Poland. He remained there until his death in 1929.

== Legacy and reception ==
The influence of Baudouin and Kruszewski was primarily on Baudouin's students, especially in Saint Petersburg, where his teaching was to some extent continued in the Leningrad school of Soviet linguistics. However, their own work was also known beyond their immediate circle. Baudoin produced many publications during his lifetime, but since much of this body of writing appeared in obscure places and in Russian and Polish, which were not accessible to many Western scholars, his ideas were not widely known to his contemporaries. One exception to this was Saussure, who had met Baudouin in 1881 at a meeting of the Paris Society of Linguistics. Baudouin donated copies of some of his and Kruszewski's works to the Society and Saussure read them with interest. In turn, Saussure's works in Proto-Indo-European were reviewed favorably by Baudouin and Kruszewsi. There was thus a certain amount of interaction, including an exchange of several letters, as well as mutual appreciation between these two major sources of modern phonological thought. However, only Saussure's work was widely known until the publication of collections of Baudouin's papers in Polish and English in the 1970s. A collection of Kruszewski's work in English translation has been promised for a number of years but, as of 2021, has not yet appeared. In 1908, Saussure wrote that Baudouin and Kruszewski were "closer than anyone else to a theoretical view of language", yet "unknown to most western scholars".

In eastern Europe, the Kazan school was more influential. Baudouin and Kruszewski influenced a generation of linguists within Kazan, including Vasily Bogoroditsky, who succeeded Kruszewski as the Chair of Indo-European at Kazan after his death. Other notable students of the Kazan school include the Indo-Europeanist Sergey Bulich, the Slavicist Alexander Ivanovich Alexandrov, and the Turkologist Wilhelm Radloff. The linguistic tradition of the Kazan school at the University of Kazan has continued up to the present day. Outside of Kazan, The Kazan school has also influenced the Russian linguists Roman Jakobson and Nikolai Trubetzkoy, who eventually formed the Prague linguistic circle, and the Polish Indo-Europeanist Jerzy Kuryłowicz.

In a 1972 paper, historian of linguistics E. F. K. Koerner called the marginalization of Baudouin in Western works of linguistic historiography a "deplorable state of affairs", citing that only one other English language work on Baudouin had been published up to that point. On the other hand, eastern European works on the history of linguistics dedicated entire chapters to Baudouin's work, equalling that of Saussure or the American linguist Leonard Bloomfield. According to linguist Stephen R. Anderson, the treatment of alternations in Kazan school phonology parallels the focus on phonological rules in generative phonology in contemporary linguistic theory, adding that their insights "are arguably more profound than many opinions underlying discussion of the same issues today".
