= Mikołaj Kruszewski bibliography =

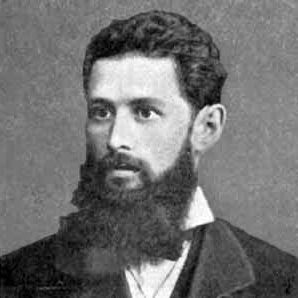
Mikołaj Kruszewski

Mikołaj Kruszewski was a nineteenth-century Polish linguist who co-founded the Kazan school of linguistics. Born in Lutsk in modern-day Ukraine, he studied at the University of Warsaw before undertaking postgraduate studies at Kazan University under the tutelage of Jan Baudouin de Courtenay in 1878. Kruszewski defended his doctoral dissertation in 1883, for which he gained professorship at Kazan. Subsequently, Kruszewski fell ill and died in 1887 at the age of 35, likely from tertiary syphilis. His linguistic career spanned only five years.

Since most of Kruszewski's works were written in Russian, they were inaccessible for most Western scholars at the time. Kruszewski translated two of his works into German: On Sound Alternation, the revised theoretical introduction to his master's dissertation, and Outline of Linguistic Science, his doctoral dissertation. Kruszewski's works remained obscure among Western scholars until the second half of the twentieth century, when the Russian linguist Roman Jakobson made efforts to promote Kruszewski, and the historian of linguistics Joanna Radwańska-Williams has described Kruszewski's work as a "lost paradigm".

== Dissertations ==
- Kruszewski, Mikołaj (1876). "Zagovory, kak vid russkoy narodnoy poezii" Заговоры как вид русской народной поэзии [Charms as a species of Russian folk poetry]. Varshavskie Universitetskie Izvestiya (3): 3–69. OCLC 1235452278.
  Kruszewski's master's dissertation at the University of Warsaw, from which he had graduated in 1875. The university's scientific journal published the dissertation, giving Kruszewski a financial reward as well.
- Kruszewski, Mikołaj (1879a). "Nablyudeniya nad nekotorymi foneticheskimi yavleniyami, svyazannymi s aktsentuatsiyey" Наблюдения над некоторыми фонетическими явлениями, связанными с акцентуацие [Observations on some phonetic phenomena related to accentuation]. Uchenyya Zapiski Imperatorskago Kazanskago Universiteta. 46 (1): 105–114. OCLC 833923052.
  Kruszewski's dissertation submitted to the Kazan University for the candidate's degree and the position of privat-docent (salaried lecturer). This work summarizes Kruszewski's investigations into Sanskrit vowels, which he had intended to be the subject of his master's thesis until Ferdinand de Saussure published the Mémoire. (Note: French: Mémoire sur le système primitif des voyelles dans les langues indo-européenes, lit. 'Memoir on the primitive system of vowels in the Indo-European languages')
- Kruszewski, Mikołaj (1881a). "K voprosu o gune. Issledovaniye v oblasti staroslavyanskogo vokalizma" К вопросу о гуне: Исследование в области старославянского вокализма [On the issue of guna: A study of Old Church Slavonic vocalism]. Russky Filologichesky Vestnik. 5 (1): 1–109. OCLC 831108039.
  Kruszewski's master's dissertation at Kazan. It was written in 1880 and defended in May 1881, qualifying him for the position of docent
  - Kruszewski, Mikołaj (1881b). Über die Lautabwechslung [On sound alternation]. Kazan: Universitäts-Buchdruckerei. OCLC 12878185.
    German translation of the theoretical introduction of Kruszewski (1881a). The translation was prepared by Kruszewski with assistance from Wilhelm Radloff and Leonard Kołmaczewski, expanding the text by around one-third to make it more accessible to Western scholars. Kruszewski self-funded the publication of the manuscript, as it was rejected by several German publishers for its focus on methodology rather than data, which was unusual in contemporary linguistic scholarship.
- Kruszewski, Mikołaj (1883). "Ocherk nauki o yazyke" Очерк науки о языке [An Outline of Linguistic Science]. Uchenyya Zapiski Imperatorskago Kazanskago Universiteta. 50 (1). OCLC 83282601.
  Kruszewski's doctoral dissertation at Kazan. It was defended in May 1883 and qualified Kruszewski to the position of ekstraordinarny professor. The historian of linguistics Joanna Radwańska-Williams describes the Outline as Kruszewski's magnum opus.
  - Kruszewski, Mikołaj (1884–1890). "Prinzipien der Sprachentwickelung" [Principles of language development]. Internationale Zeitschrift für Allgemeine Sprachwissenschaft. 1–5. Leipzig: 1.295-307 (1884), 2.258-268 (1885), 3.145-170 (1887), 5.133-144, 399-360 (1890).
    German translation of Kruszewski (1883). Kruszewski translated the book into German with the help of Baudouin, Alexander Ivanovich Alexandrov (a student under Baudouin at the time), and the German linguist Friedrich Techmer. The journal in which it appeared, the Internationale Zeitschrift für allgemeine Sprachwissenschaft, was edited by Techmer.

== Journal articles ==
- Kruszewski, Mikołaj (1879b). "Ob 'analogie' i 'narodnoy etimologii ("Volksetymologie")" Об "аналогии" и "народной этимологии" ("Volksetymologie") [On 'analogy' and 'folk etymology' ('Volksetymologie')]. Russky Filologichesky Vestnik. 2 (3): 109–122.
  A critique of the concept of analogy as applied by Neogrammarian linguists at the time
- Kruszewski, Mikołaj (1879c). "Vosem gimnov Rig-Vedy" Восемь гимнов Риг-Веды [Eight hymns of the Rig-Veda]. Uchenyya Zapiski Imperatorskago Kazanskago Universiteta. 46: 105–114.
- Kruszewski, Mikołaj (1879d). "Dopolnitelnaya zametka k statye ob 'narodnoy etimologii'" Дополнительная заметка к статье об "народной этимологии" [Additional note on the article 'On analogy...']. Russky Filologichesky Vestnik. 2 (4): 266.
  A follow-up note to Kruszewski (1879b), in which he criticizes the Neogrammarian Karl Brugmann's usage of the term association for analogy
- Kruszewski, Mikołaj (1880a). "Lingvisticheskie zametki. 1: Noveyshie otkrytiya v oblasti ario-evropeyskogo vokalizma" Лингвистические заметки. 1: Новейшие открытия в области арио-европейского вокализма [Linguistic notes. 1: Latest discoveries in the field of Indo-European vocalism]. Russky Filologichesky Vestnik. 4 (2): 33–45. OCLC 716102980.
  Favorable reviews of Brugmann's 1876 Nasalis sonans (Note: German: Nasalis sonans in der indogermanischen Grundsprache, lit. 'Vocalic Nasals in the Proto-Indo-European language') and Saussure's 1879 Mémoire
- Kruszewski, Mikołaj (1880b). "Lingvisticheskie zametki. 2: Izmeneniye soglasnykh grupp vida EE" Лингвистические заметки. 2: Изменение согласных групп вида ЕЕ [Linguistic notes. 2: Change of consonant clusters of the type EE]. Russky Filologichesky Vestnik. 4 (2): 46–52. OCLC 716102980.
- Kruszewski, Mikołaj (1880c). "Lingvisticheskie zametki. 3: O morfologicheskoy absorptsii" Лингвистические заметки. 3: О морфологической абсорпции [Linguistic notes. 3: On morphological absorption]. Russky Filologichesky Vestnik. 4 (2): 53–62. OCLC 716102980.
- Kruszewski, Mikołaj (1882a). "Otchet o zanyatiyakh sravnitelnym yazykoznaniem za vremya ot 15 dekabrya 1878 po 1 oktyabrya 1879" Отчет о занятиях сравнительным языкознанием за время от 15 декабря 1878 по 1 октября 1879 [Report on studies in comparative linguistics conducted between 15 December 1878 and 1 October 1879]. Izvestiya Imperatorskago Kazanskago Universiteta. 18 (1/2): 32–36. OCLC 833923056.
- Kruszewski, Mikołaj (1882b). "Otvet g. Bryuckneru" Ответ г. Брюкнеру [Reply to Mr Brückner]. Russky Filologichesky Vestnik. 7: 135–139.
  Reply to an 1881 review of Kruszewski (1881b) by the Slavist Aleksander Brückner
- Kruszewski, Mikołaj (1885). "Przyczynek do historyi pierwotnych samogłosek długich" [Contribution to the history of the original long vowels]. Prace Filologiczne. 1: 91–101. ISSN 0138-0567.
  Kruszewski's final work published during his lifetime and the only one published in Polish

== Posthumous publications ==
The following five works are edited by the linguist Vasily Bogoroditsky.

- Kruszewski, Mikołaj (1891). "Ocherki po yazykovedeniyu. 1: Frantsuzskaya grammatika" Очерки по языковедению. 1: Французская грамматика [Essays in linguistics. 1: French grammar]. Russky Filologichesky Vestnik. 28 (2, 4): 253–271, 173–186.
  Includes two obituaries of Kruszewski, one by Bogoroditsky and one anonymous, signed "M...m"
- Kruszewski, Mikołaj (1892–1894). "Ocherki po yazykovedeniyu. 2: Antropofonika" Очерки по языковедению. 2: Антропофоника [Essays in linguistics. 2: Anthropophon(et)ics]. Russky Filologichesky Vestnik. 28–31: 28:4.266-290 (1892), 29.332 (1893), 31:1/2.66-83 (1894).
- Kruszewski, Mikołaj (1894a). "Ocherki po yazykovedeniyu: Pribavleniye. Predmet, deleniye i metod nauki o yazyke" Очерки по языковедению: Прибавление. Предмет, деление и метод науки о языке [Essays in linguistics. Supplement: The subject, division and method of linguistic science]. Russky Filologichesky Vestnik. 31 (1/2): 84–90.
  Transcript of the inaugural lecture delivered by Kruszewski on 15 January 1881
- Kruszewski, Mikołaj (1894b). "Vazhneyshie dannye fonetiki romanskikh yazykov" Важнейшие данные фонетики романских языков [Most important phonetic facts of the Romance languages]. Uchenyya Zapiski Imperatorskago Kazanskago Universiteta. 61 (2): 99–120.
- Kruszewski, Mikołaj (1894c). "Sravnitelnaya grammatika romanskikh yazykov" Сравнительная грамматика романских языков [Comparative grammar of Romance languages]. Uchenyya Zapiski Imperatorskago Kazanskago Universiteta. 61.

=== Reprints ===
- V. A. Zvegintsev, ed. (1956). Khrestomatiya po istorii yazykoznaniya XIX–XX vekov Хрестоматия по истории языкознания ХIX−XX веков [Reader on the History of Linguistics of the XIX–XX Centuries]. Moscow.
  Reprints Kruszewski (1894a) and excerpts from Kruszewski (1883). Second and third editions of the volume were published in 1960 and 1964 respectively.
- V. V. Shcheulin; V. I. Medvedeva, eds. (1965). Khrestomatiya po istorii grammaticheskikh ucheny v Rossii Хрестоматия по истории грамматических учений в России [Reader on the History of Grammatical Teachings in Russia]. Moscow.
  Reprints Kruszewski (1883) and the articles Kruszewski (1880a), Kruszewski (1880b), and Kruszewski (1880c)
- F. M. Berezin; F. P. Filin, eds. (1973). Khrestomatiya po istorii russkogo yazykoznaniya Хрестоматия по истории русского языкознания [Reader on the History of Russian Linguistics]. Moscow.
  Reprints Kruszewski (1881a), Kruszewski (1891), Kruszewski (1894a), and Kruszewski (1883)
- B. I. Suprovsky; A. E. Suprun, eds. (1976). Obshcheye yazyko znaniye: Khrestomati Общее языко знание: Хрестомати [General Linguistics: Reader]. Minsk.
  Reprints Kruszewski (1883).
- V. N. Yartseva, ed. (1998). Krushevsky N. V. Izbr. raboty po yazykoznaniyu Крушевский Н. В. Избр. работы по языкознанию [N. V. Krushevsky Selected Works on Linguistics]. Moscow. ISBN 5201133223.
  Reprints Kruszewski (1876), Kruszewski (1879b), Kruszewski (1880b), Kruszewski (1894a), Kruszewski (1881a), Kruszewski (1883), and Kruszewski (1891)

=== Translations ===
- Kruszewski, Mikołaj (1967). Wybór pism [Selected writings] (in Polish). Translated by Jerzy Kuryłowicz; Krystyna Pomorska. Wrocław-Warszawa-Kraków: Zakład narodowy im. Ossolińskich. OCLC 3170927.
  Includes Polish translations of Kruszewski (1879b), the three articles Kruszewski (1880a), Kruszewski (1880b), Kruszewski (1880c), and the three dissertations of Kruszewski (1881b), Kruszewski (1883), and Kruszewski (1876). The volume includes forewords from Jerzy Kuryłowicz and Roman Jakobson, with Kuryłowicz providing a biographical introduction and Jakobson an appraisal of Kruszewski's work.
- Kruszewski, Mikołaj (1978a) [1880]. "Annotazioni: Nuovissime scoperte nel campo del vocalismo indoeuropeo" [Notes: Latest discoveries in the field of Indo-European vocalism]. In Giuseppe Carlo Vincenzi (ed.). Saggio sul vocalismo indoeuropeo (in Italian). Translated by Anton Maria Raffo. Bologna: Cooperativa Libraria Universitaria Editrice. pp. 441–450. OCLC 797572435.
  Italian translation of Kruszewski (1880a)
- Kruszewski, Mikołaj (1978b) [1881]. "On Sound Alternation". In Philip H. Baldi; Ronald N. Werth (eds.). Readings in Historical Phonology: Chapters in the Theory of Sound Change. Translated by Robert Austerlitz. Pennsylvania State University Press. pp. 64–91. ISBN 0271005254.
  English translation of Kruszewski (1881b)
- Kruszewski, Mikołaj (1995). E. F. K. Koerner (ed.). Writings in general linguistics: On Sound Alternation (1881) and Outline of Linguistic Science (1883). Amsterdam Classics in Linguistics. Vol. 11. Amsterdam: John Benjamins. doi:10.1075/acil.11. ISBN 978-90-272-0977-1.
  Includes a revised version of Kruszewski (1978b) by Robert Austerlitz and a new translation of Kruszewski (1883) by Gregory Eramian
- Kruszewski, Mikołaj (2002). Zamovliannia yak vyd rosiiskoi narodnoi poezii Замовляння як вид російської народної поезії [Incantations as a Form of Russian Folk Poetry] (in Ukrainian). Translated by Zinaida Pakholok. Lutsk: Visnyk i K. ISBN 966-96095-3-4. OCLC 749427087.
  Ukrainian translation of Kruszewski (1876)
- Kruszewski, Mikołaj (2004). Visim himniv Pihvedy Вісім гімнів Рігведи [Eight Hymns of Rigveda] (in Ukrainian). Translated by Zinaida Pakholok. Lutsk: Visnyk i K. ISBN 966-8575-08-3. OCLC 749953716.
  Ukrainian translation of Kruszewski (1879c)
