= Jan Baudouin de Courtenay =

Polish linguist (1845–1929)

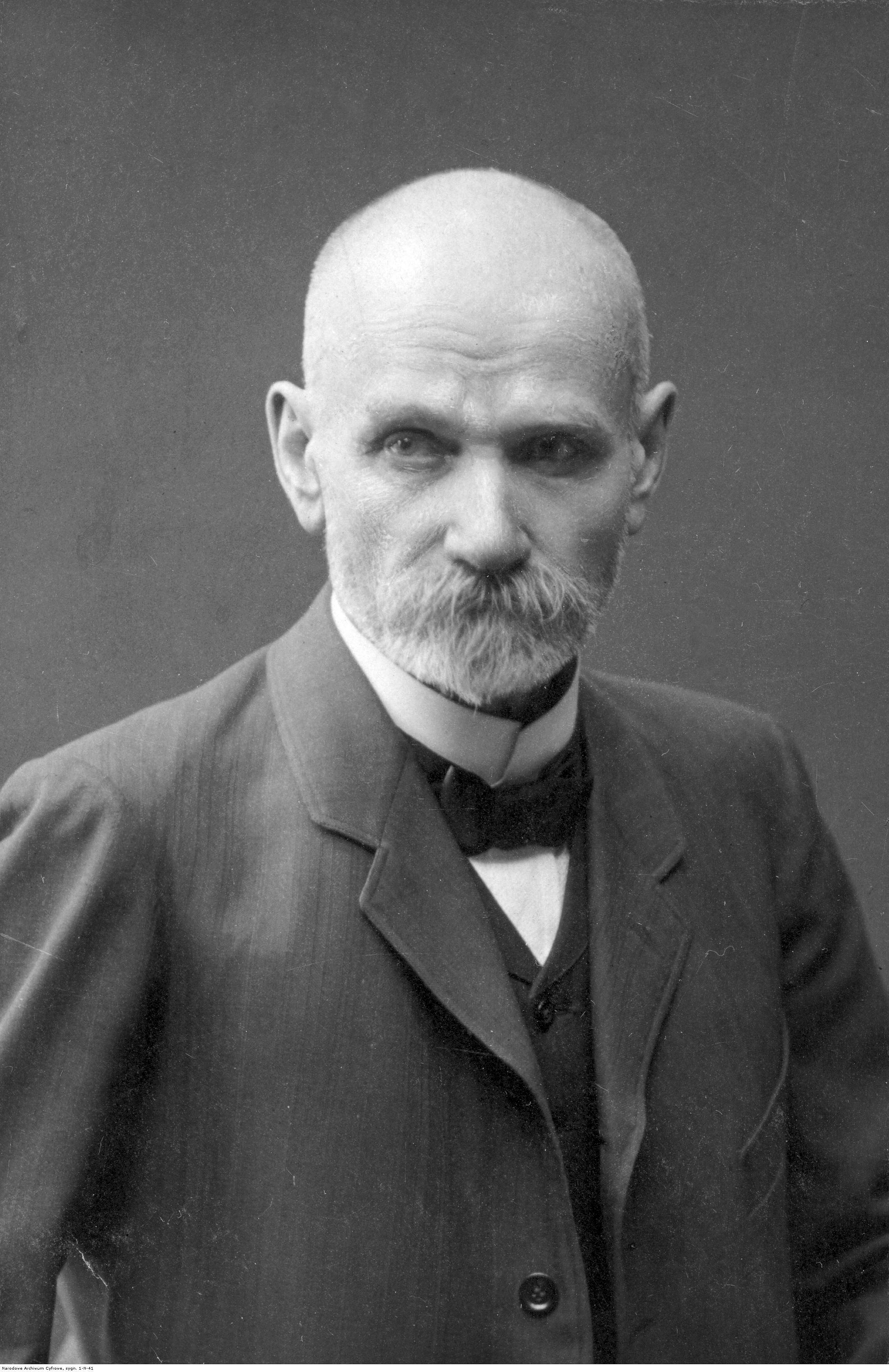
- Born: Jan Niecisław Ignacy Baudouin de Courtenay; 13 March 1845; Radzymin, Congress Poland, Russian Empire
- Died: 3 November 1929 (aged 84); Warsaw, Poland

Academic background
- Education: University of Jena; University of Leipzig
- Doctoral advisor: August Leskien
- Other advisor: August Schleicher

Academic work
- Discipline: Phonology
- Institutions: Kazan University
- Doctoral students: Mikołaj Kruszewski
- Notable ideas: Theory of the phoneme and phonetic alternations

Jan Niecisław Ignacy Baudouin de Courtenay, also known as Ivan Alexandrovich Baudouin de Courtenay (Note: Russian: Иван Александрович Бодуэн де Куртенэ) (13 March 1845 – 3 November 1929), was a prominent Polish and Russian linguist and Slavist, best known for his theory of the phoneme and phonetic alternations.

For most of his life Baudouin de Courtenay worked at Imperial Russian universities: Kazan (1874–1883), Dorpat (now Estonia) (1883–1893), Kraków (1893–1899) in Austria-Hungary, and St. Petersburg (1900–1918). In 1919–1929 he was a professor at the re-established University of Warsaw in independent Poland.

== Biography ==
He was born in Radzymin, in the Warsaw Governorate of Congress Poland (a state in personal union with the Russian Empire), to a family of distant French extraction. One of his ancestors had been a French aristocrat who immigrated to Poland during the reign of Polish King Augustus II the Strong.

In 1862 Baudouin de Courtenay entered the "Main School," a predecessor of the University of Warsaw. In 1866 he graduated from its historical and philological faculty and won a scholarship of the Russian Imperial Ministry of Education. After leaving Poland, he studied at various foreign universities, including those of Prague, Jena and Berlin. In 1870 he received a doctorate from the University of Leipzig for his work on analogy and a master's degree from St. Petersburg for his Polish-language dissertation On the Old Polish Language Prior to the 14th Century.

Baudouin de Courtenay established the Kazan School of linguistics in the mid-1870s and served as professor at the local university from 1875. Later he was chosen as the head of linguistics faculty at the University of Dorpat (1883–1893). In 1882 he married historian and journalist Romualda Bagnicka. Between 1894 and 1898 he occupied the same post at the Jagiellonian University in Kraków only to be appointed to St. Petersburg, where he continued to refine his theory of phonetic alternations. After Poland regained independence in 1918, he returned to Warsaw, where he formed the core of the linguistics faculty of the University of Warsaw. From 1887 he held a permanent seat in the Polish Academy of Skills and from 1897 he was a member of the Petersburg Academy of Sciences.

Baudouin de Courtenay was the editor of the 3rd (1903–1909) and 4th (1912–1914) editions of the Explanatory Dictionary of the Living Great Russian Language compiled by Russian lexicographer Vladimir Dahl (1801–1872).

Apart from his scientific work, Baudouin de Courtenay was also a strong supporter of the national revival of various national minority and ethnic groups. In 1915 he was arrested by the Okhrana, the Russian secret service, for publishing a brochure on the autonomy of peoples under Russian rule. He spent three months in prison, but was released. In 1922, without his knowledge, he was proposed by the national minorities of Poland as a presidential candidate, but was defeated in the third round of voting in the Polish parliament and eventually Gabriel Narutowicz was chosen. He was also an active Esperantist and president of the Polish Esperanto Association. In 1925, he was one of the co-founders of the Polish Linguistic Society.

In 1927, he formally withdrew from the Catholic Church without joining any other religious denomination. He died in Warsaw. He is buried at the Protestant Reformed Cemetery in Warsaw with the epitaph "He sought truth and justice".

== Contribution to linguistics ==
His work had a major influence on 20th-century linguistic theory, and it served as a foundation for several schools of phonology. He was an early champion of synchronic linguistics, the study of contemporary spoken languages, which he developed contemporaneously with the structuralist linguistic theory of Swiss linguist Ferdinand de Saussure. Among the most notable of his achievements is the distinction between statics and dynamics of languages and between a language (an abstract group of elements) and speech (its implementation by individuals) – compare Saussure's concepts of langue and parole.

Together with his students, Mikołaj Kruszewski and Lev Shcherba, Baudouin de Courtenay also shaped the modern usage of the term "phoneme" (Baudouin de Courtenay 1876–77 and Baudouin de Courtenay 1894), which had been coined in 1873 by the French linguist Antoni Dufriche-Desgenettes who proposed it as a one-word equivalent for the German Sprachlaut. His work on the theory of phonetic alternations may have had an influence on the work of Ferdinand de Saussure according to Ernst F. K. Koerner.

Three major schools of 20th-century phonology arose directly from his distinction between physiophonetic (phonological) and psychophonetic (morphophonological) alternations: the Leningrad school of phonology, the Moscow school of phonology, and the Prague school of phonology. All three schools developed different positions on the nature of Baudouin's alternational dichotomy. The Prague School was best known outside the field of Slavic linguistics. Throughout his life he published hundreds of scientific works in Polish, Russian, Czech, Slovenian, Italian, French and German.

== Views ==
According to historian Norman Davies, Baudouin de Courtenay was one of the most extraordinary Polish thinkers at the turn of the 19th and 20th centuries. Davies writes:

"He was a pacifist, an advocate of the fight for environmental protection, a feminist, a fighter for progress in the field of education, and a free thinker, and he was against most of the social and intellectual conventions of his day."

Baudouin de Courtenay was an atheist and did not consider himself a member of the Catholic Church for most of his life. He was Chairman of the Polish Association of Freethinkers.

Baudouin de Courtenay was in favor of introducing Polish science to all Jewish schools in the Second Polish Republic, and Yiddish to all Polish schools. In his public appearances, he openly criticized anti-semitism and manifestations of organized xenophobia, for which he was repeatedly attacked.

== Legacy ==
His daughter, Cezaria Jędrzejewiczowa was one of the founders of the Polish school of ethnology and anthropology as well as a professor at the universities of Vilnius and Warsaw. He had four other children: Zofia, a painter and sculptor; Świętosław, a lawyer and diplomat; Ewelina, a historian; and Maria, a lawyer.

He appears as a character in Joseph Skibell's 2010 novel, A Curable Romantic.

== See also ==
- History of linguistics

== Sources ==
- Arleta Adamska-Sałaciak. "Jan Baudouin de Courtenay's contribution to linguistic theory", Historiographia Linguistica 25 (1998): 25–60; reprint in Towards a History of Linguistics in Poland: From the Early Beginnings to the End of the Twentieth Century, eds. E.F.K. Koerner & Aleksander Szwedek. Amsterdam–Philadelphia: John Benjamins, 2001, pp. 175–208.
- Maria di Salvo. Il pensiero linguistico di J. Baudouin de Courtenay. Venice & Padua: Marsilio, 1975.
- Frank Häusler. Das Problem Phonetik und Phonologie bei Baudouin de Courtenay und in seiner Nachfolge. Leipzig: Niemeyer, 1968 (2nd edn., Halle/Saale: Max Niemeyer, 1976).
- Roman Jakobson. "The Kazan school of Polish linguistics and its place in the international development of phonology", Roman Jakobson: Selected Writings, vol. II: Word and Language. The Hague: Mouton, 1972.
- E. F. K. Koerner. Essays in the History of Linguistics. Amsterdam & Philadelphia: John Benjamins, 2004: ch. 7.
- E. F. K. Koerner. "Jan Baudouin de Courtenay: His place in the history of linguistic science", Canadian Slavonic Papers/Revue canadienne des Slavistes 14, no. 4 (1972): 663–682 (repr. in Toward a Historiography of Linguistics: Selected Essays, 1978, pp. 107–126).
- R. A. Rothstein. "The linguist as dissenter: Jan Baudouin de Courtenay", For Wiktor Weintraub: Essays in Polish Literature, Language, and History Presented on the Occasion of his 65th Birthday, ed. V. Erlich. The Hague: Mouton, 1975.
- W. R. Schmalstieg, "Baudouin de Courtenay contribution to Lithuanian linguistics", Lituanus 41, no. 1 (1995): 5-25.
- Edward Stankiewicz ed. & trans. A Baudouin de Courtenay Anthology: The Beginnings of Structural Linguistics. Bloomington & London: Indiana University Press, 1972.
- Edward Stankiewicz. Baudouin de Courtenay and the Foundations of Structural Linguistics. Lisse: Peter de Ridder Press, 1976.
- Philipp Strazny, ed. "Baudouin de Courtenay, Jan Ignacy Niecisław", Encyclopedia of Linguistics, vol. 1: A–L. NY–Oxon: Fitzroy Dearborn, 2005, pp. 128–130.
- Margaret Thomas, "Jan Baudouin de Courtenay (1845-1929)", Fifty Key Thinkers on Language and Linguistics. London–NY: Routledge, 2011, pp. 135–140.
