= Morphophonology =

Study of the interaction between morphology and phonology

Morphophonology (also morphophonemics or morphonology) is the branch of linguistics that studies the interaction between morphological and phonological or phonetic processes. Its chief focus is the sound changes that take place in morphemes (minimal meaningful units) when they combine to form words.

The origins of morphophonology trace back to the early 20th century with foundational works in structural linguistics. Notable contributions include Roman Jakobson's insights into phonological alternations and Chomsky and Halle's The Sound Pattern of English (1968), which formalized the relationship between phonology and morphology within generative grammar. Subsequent theories, such as Autosegmental phonology and Optimality theory, have refined the analysis of morphophonological patterns.

Morphophonological analysis often involves an attempt to give a series of formal rules or constraints that successfully predict the regular sound changes occurring in the morphemes of a given language. Such a series of rules converts a theoretical underlying representation into a surface form that is pronounced. The units which compose the underlying representations of morphemes are sometimes called morphophonemes. The surface form produced by the morphophonological rules may consist of phonemes (which are then subject to ordinary phonological rules to produce speech sounds or phones), or else the morphophonological analysis may bypass the phoneme stage and produce the phones themselves.

== Morphophonemes and morphophonological rules ==
When morphemes combine, they influence each other's sound structure (whether analyzed at a phonetic or phonemic level), resulting in different variant pronunciations for the same morpheme. Morphophonology attempts to analyze these processes. A language's morphophonological structure is generally described with a series of rules that, ideally, can predict every morphophonological alternation that takes place in the language.

An example of a morphophonological alternation in English is provided by the plural morpheme, written as "-s" or "-es". Its pronunciation varies among [s], [z], and [ɪz], as in cats, dogs, and horses respectively. A purely phonological analysis would most likely assign to these three endings the phonemic representations /s/, /z/, /ɪz/. On a morphophonological level, however, they may all be considered to be forms of the underlying object ⫽z⫽, which is a morphophoneme realized as one of the phonemic forms {s, z, ɪz}. The different forms it takes are dependent on the segment at the end of the morpheme to which it attaches: the dependencies are described by morphophonological rules. (The behaviour of the English past tense ending "-ed" is similar: it can be pronounced /t/, /d/ or /ɪd/, as in hoped, bobbed, and added.)

The plural suffix "-s" can also influence the form taken by the preceding morpheme, as in the case of the words leaf and knife, which end with [f] in the singular but have [v] in the plural (leaves, knives). On a morphophonological level, the morphemes may be analyzed as ending in a morphophoneme ⫽F⫽, which becomes voiced when a voiced consonant (in this case the ⫽z⫽ of the plural ending) is attached to it. The rule may be written symbolically as /F/ → [α_{voice}] / __ [α_{voice}]. This expression is called alpha notation, in which α can be + (positive value) or − (negative value).

Common conventions to indicate a morphophonemic rather than phonemic representation include double slashes (⫽ ⫽) (as above, implying that the transcription is "more phonemic than simply phonemic"). This is the only convention consistent with the IPA. Other conventions include pipes (| |), double pipes (‖ ‖) (Note: The IPA provides single and double pipes for minor and major suprasegmental groups, and these are scarcely distinguishable from the letters for dental and alveolar-lateral clicks.) and braces ({ }). (Note: The IPA provides braces for prosodic notation.) Braces, from a convention in set theory, tend to be used when the phonemes are all listed, as in {s, z, ɪz} and {t, d, ɪd} for the English plural and past-tense morphemes ⫽z⫽ and ⫽d⫽ above.

For instance, the English word cats may be transcribed phonetically as [ˈkʰæʔts], phonemically as /ˈkæts/ and morphophonemically as ⫽ˈkætz⫽, if the plural is argued to be underlyingly ⫽z⫽, assimilating to /s/ after a voiceless nonsibilant. The tilde ~ may indicate morphological alternation, as in ⫽ˈniːl ~ nɛl+t⫽ or {n iː~ɛ l}, {n iː~ɛ l+t} for kneel~knelt (the plus sign '+' indicates a morpheme boundary).

== Types of changes ==
Inflected and agglutinating languages may have extremely complicated systems of morphophonemics. Examples of complex morphophonological systems include:

- Sandhi, the phenomenon behind the English examples of plural and past tense above, is found in virtually all languages to some degree. Even Mandarin, which is sometimes said to display no morphology, nonetheless displays tone sandhi, a morphophonemic alternation.
- Consonant gradation, found in some Uralic languages such as Finnish, Estonian, Northern Sámi, and Nganasan.
- Vowel harmony, which occurs in varying degrees in languages all around the world, notably Turkic languages.
- Ablaut, found in English and other Germanic languages. Ablaut is the phenomenon wherein stem vowels change form depending on context, as in English sing, sang, sung.

== Relation with phonology ==
Until the 1950s, many phonologists assumed that neutralizing rules generally applied before allophonic rules. Thus phonological analysis was split into two parts: a morphophonological part, where neutralizing rules were developed to derive phonemes from morphophonemes; and a purely phonological part, where phones were derived from the phonemes. Since the 1960s (in particular with the work of the generative school, such as Chomsky and Halle's The Sound Pattern of English) many linguists have moved away from making such a split, instead regarding the surface phones as being derived from the underlying morphophonemes (which may be referred to using various terminology) through a single system of (morpho)phonological rules.

The purpose of both phonemic and morphophonemic analysis is to produce simpler underlying descriptions for what appear on the surface to be complicated patterns. In purely phonemic analysis, the data is just a set of words in a language, while for morphophonemic analysis, the words must be considered in grammatical paradigms to take account of the underlying morphemes. It is postulated that morphemes are recorded in the speaker's "lexicon" in an invariant (morphophonemic) form, which, in a given environment, is converted by rules into a surface form. The analyst attempts to present as completely as possible a system of underlying units (morphophonemes) and a series of rules that act on them to produce surface forms consistent with the linguistic data.

== Isolation forms ==
The isolation form of a morpheme is the form in which that morpheme appears in isolation (when it is not subject to the effects of any other morpheme). In the case of a bound morpheme, such as the English past tense ending "-ed", it is generally not possible to identify an isolation form since such a morpheme does not occur in isolation.

It is often reasonable to assume that the isolation form of a morpheme provides its underlying representation. For example, in some varieties of American English, plant is pronounced [plænt], while planting is [ˈplænɪŋ], where the morpheme "plant-" appears in the form [plæn]. Here, the underlying form can be assumed to be ⫽plænt⫽, corresponding to the isolation form, since rules can be set up to derive the reduced form [plæn] from this (but it would be difficult or impossible to set up rules that would derive the isolation form [plænt] from an underlying ⫽plæn⫽).

That is not always the case, however; the isolation form itself is sometimes subject to neutralization that does not apply to some other instances of the morpheme. For example, the French word petit ("small") is pronounced in isolation without the final [t] sound, but in certain derived forms (such as the feminine petite), the [t] is heard. If the isolation form were adopted as the underlying form, the information that there is a final "t" would be lost, and it would then be difficult to explain the appearance of the "t" in the inflected forms. Similar considerations apply to languages with final obstruent devoicing, in which the isolation form undergoes loss of voicing contrast, but other forms may not.

If the grammar of a language includes two rules, A and B, ordered such that A precedes B, a derivation may result in rule A creating the necessary environment for rule B to apply, even though that environment did not exist beforehand. In this case, the two rules are said to be in a feeding relationship.

If rule A is ordered before rule B in a derivation and rule A destroys the environment to which rule B applies, the rules are in a bleeding order.

If A is ordered before B, and B creates an environment in which A could have applied, B is then said to counterfeed A, and the relationship is counterfeeding.

If A is ordered before B, the relationship is counterbleeding if B destroys the environment to which A applies but A has already applied, so that B cannot bleed A.

Conjunctive ordering is the ordering that ensures that all rules are applied in a derivation before the surface representation occurs. Rules applied in a feeding relationship are said to be conjunctively ordered.

Disjunctive ordering is an ordering in which one rule applies and prevents the other rule from applying in the surface representation. Such rules have a bleeding relationship and are said to be disjunctively ordered.

== Orthography ==
The principle behind alphabetic writing systems is that the letters (graphemes) represent phonemes. However, in many such orthographies, graphemes and phonemes correspond inexactly, and certain spellings sometimes represent a word's morphophonological structure better than its purely phonological structure. An example is that the English plural morpheme is written -s, regardless of whether it is pronounced /s/ or /z/: cats and dogs, not dogz.

The above example involves active morphology (inflection), and morphophonemic spellings are common in this context in many languages. Another type of spelling that can be described as morphophonemic is the kind that reflects the etymology of words. Such spellings are particularly common in English; examples include science /saɪ/ vs. unconscious /ʃ/; prejudice /prɛ/ vs. prequel /priː/; sign /saɪn/ and signature /sɪɡn/; nation /neɪ/ vs. nationalism /næ/; and special /spɛ/ vs. species /spiː/.

== See also ==
- Allomorph
- Sandhi

== Bibliography ==
- Hayes, Bruce (2009). "Morphophonemic Analysis" Introductory Phonology, pp. 161–185. Blackwell
