= Antoni Dufriche-Desgenettes =

Antoni Dufriche-Desgenettes (26 February 1804, Paris – 19 December 1878, Saint-Mandé), baptized Antoine Marie Dufriche-Foulaines, was a French seafaring merchant, poet and amateur phonetician.

== Biography ==
His father François Nicolas, a brother of René-Nicolas Dufriche Desgenettes, had changed his family name from Dufriche-Desgenettes to Foulaines-Dufriche and was a lawyer and political writer; Antoni's mother Antoinette Elisabeth Vassault-Vareille was a translator from English and a publisher-bookseller. After many years at sea, Dufriche worked in the Netherlands as a French teacher for some time. In the late 1850s, he returned to Paris but still frequently travelled abroad, especially to Java. His travels enabled him to collect information about the sounds of many languages and to develop a universal phonetic alphabet. He is best known for the introduction of the term phoneme (in its French form phonème) for an individual sound as an element of a language-specific or universal sound inventory. It is attested in his writings since the early 1860s and became more widely known through several papers which Dufriche presented at meetings of the Société de Linguistique de Paris (Paris Linguistics Society). The first of these, "Sur la nature des consonnes nasales" [On the nature of nasal consonants, in French], which Louis Havet read for him on 24 May 1873, was not published, but an anonymous report, probably written by Havet, summarized it and drew attention to the term phonème.

In 1860, Dufriche joined the Société d'ethnographie orientale et américaine (Society for oriental and American ethnography), whose members "were largely linguists and specialists in Asian texts and pre-Columbian codices", and he was among the founders of the Société de Linguistique de Paris in 1864. As an autodidact in linguistics, he remained something of an outsider, however, and it is likely that the term phoneme survived primarily thanks to its acceptance by Louis Havet, although it underwent a number of metamorphoses in the course of half a century until it finally acquired the meaning 'smallest distinctive unit'.

A biographical sketch of Dufriche was compiled by E. F. K. Koerner in 1976, but his date of death and his full first name long remained a mystery.
