= Diachrony and synchrony =

Complementary viewpoints in linguistic analysis

Diachrony and synchrony are two complementary viewpoints in linguistic analysis. A diachronic – from δια- ('through, across') + χρόνος ('time') – approach, as in historical linguistics, considers the development and evolution of a language through history. In contrast, a synchronic approach – from Ancient Greek: συν- ('together') + χρόνος ('time') – considers a language at a moment in time without taking its history into account.

For example, a synchronic study of Middle English would focus on understanding how the language functioned at a given stage in its history. A diachronic approach, by contrast, studies language change by comparing different stages at different historical periods. The terms synchrony and diachrony are often associated with the historical linguist Ferdinand de Saussure, who considered the synchronic perspective as systematic but argued that language change is too unpredictable to be considered a system.

== Conceptual development ==
The concepts were theorized by the Swiss linguist Ferdinand de Saussure, professor of general linguistics in Geneva from 1896 to 1911, and appeared in writing in his posthumous Course in General Linguistics published in 1916.

Saussure's teachers in historical-comparative and reconstructive linguistics such as Georg Curtius advocated the neo-grammarian manifesto according to which linguistic change is based on absolute laws. Thus, it was argued that ancient languages without surviving data could be reconstructed limitlessly after the discovery of such laws. In contradiction to his predecessors, Saussure demonstrated with multiple examples in his Course that such alleged laws are too unreliable to allow reconstructions far beyond the empirical data. Therefore, in Saussure's view, language change (diachrony) does not form a system. By contrast, each synchronic stage is held together by a systemic equilibrium based on the interconnectedness of meaning and form. To understand why a language has the forms it has at a given stage, both the diachronic and the synchronic dimension must be considered.

Saussure likewise rejected the idea of the Darwinian linguists August Schleicher and Max Müller, who considered languages as living organisms arguing that linguistics belongs to life sciences. Saussure illustrates the historical development of languages by way of his distinction between the synchronic and the diachronic perspective employing a metaphor of moving pictures. Even though objects on film appear to be moving, at a closer inspection, this turns out to be an illusion because each picture is static ('synchronic') and there is nothing between the pictures except a lifeless frame. In a similar manner, the "life" of language—simply language change—consists of a series of static points, which are physically independent of the previous stage. In such a context, Saussure warns against the confusion of synchrony and diachrony expressing his concern that these could not be studied simultaneously.

Following the posthumous publication of Saussure's Course, the separation of synchronic and diachronic linguistics became controversial and was rejected by structural linguists including Roman Jakobson and André Martinet, but was well-received by the generative grammarians, who considered Saussure's statement as an overall rejection of the historical-comparative method. In American linguistics, Saussure became regarded as an opponent of historical linguistics. In 1979, Joseph Greenberg stated

"One of the major developments of the last decade or so in linguistics has been a revived and apparently still expanding interest in historical linguistics (..) As a minimum, the strict separation of synchronic and diachronic studies—envisaged by Saussure, but never absolute in practice—is now widely rejected."

By contrast, Mark Aronoff argues that Saussure rooted linguistic theory in synchronic states rather than diachrony breaking a 19th-century tradition of evolutionary explanation in linguistics.

A dualistic opposition between synchrony and diachrony has been carried over into philosophy and sociology, for instance by Roland Barthes and Jean-Paul Sartre. Jacques Lacan also used it for psychoanalysis. Prior to de Saussure, many similar concepts were also developed independently by Polish linguists Jan Baudouin de Courtenay and Mikołaj Kruszewski of the Kazan School, who used the terms statics and dynamics of language.

In 1970 Eugenio Coșeriu, revisiting De Saussure's synchrony and diachrony distinction in the description of language, coined the terms diatopic, diastratic and diaphasic to describe linguistic variation.
