= Manfred Mayrhofer =

Austrian linguist (1926–2011)

- Born: 26 September 1926; Linz, Austria
- Died: 31 October 2011 (aged 85); Vienna, Austria

Academic background
- Education: University of Graz

Manfred Mayrhofer (26 September 1926 – 31 October 2011) was an Austrian Indo-Europeanist who specialized in Indo-Iranian languages. Mayrhofer served as professor emeritus at the University of Vienna. He is noted for his etymological dictionary of Sanskrit.

Mayrhofer was born in Linz and studied Indo-European and Semitic linguistics and philosophy at the University of Graz, where he received his Ph.D. in 1949. From 1953 to 1963 he taught at the University of Würzburg, and from 1963 to 1966 he was a professor at Saarland University. In 1966 he returned to Austria, serving as professor at the University of Vienna until his retirement in 1990. He died in Vienna at the age of 85.

== Works ==
- 1953 – Sanskrit-Grammatik.
  - English translation: A Sanskrit Grammar (2003), ISBN 0-8173-1285-4.
- 1956–80 – Kurzgefasstes etymologisches Wörterbuch des Altindischen. 4 vols. Heidelberg: Carl Winter. ISBN 0-8288-5722-9.
  - 1956 – vol. 1: A–Th
  - 1963 – vol. 2: D–M
  - 1976 – vol. 3: Y–H
  - 1980 – vol. 4: Index
- 1966 – Die Indo-Arier im alten Vorderasien. Wiesbaden: O. Harrassowitz, 1966.
- 1974 – Die Arier im Vorderen Orient, ein Mythos? Mit einem bibliographischen Supplement. Vienna: Verlag der Österr. Akademie der Wissenschaften, 1974.
- 1977 – Die avestischen Namen, IPNB I/1 (Vienna).
- 1978 – Sanskrit-Grammatik mit sprachvergleichenden Erläuterungen (1978), ISBN 3-11-007177-0.
- 1979 – Die altiranischen Namen (Vienna), ISBN 3-7001-0300-X.
- 1979/1996 – Ausgewählte kleine Schriften, ISBN 3-88226-038-6.
- 1981 – Nach hundert Jahren. Ferdinand de Saussures Frühwerk und seine Rezeption durch die heutige Indogermanistik. Heidelberg: Carl Winter.
- 1982 – Sanskrit und die Sprachen Alteuropas (Göttingen)
- 1982 – “Welches Material aus dem Indo-arischen von Mitanni verbleibt für eine selektive Darstellung?”, in Investigationes philologicae et comparativae: Gedenkschrift für Heinz Kronasser, ed. E. Neu. Wiesbaden: O. Harrassowitz, 1982, pp. 72–90.
- 1986 – Indogermanische Grammatik, vol. 1: Lautlehre. Heidelberg: Carl Winter. (with Jerzy Kuryłowicz and Calvert Watkins), ISBN 3-533-03487-9
- 1992–2001 – Etymologisches Wörterbuch des Altindoarischen. 3 vols. Heidelberg: Carl Winter. ISBN 3-533-03826-2.
  - 1992 – vol. 1
  - 1998 – vol. 2
  - 2001 – vol. 3
- 2004 – Die Hauptprobleme der indogermanischen Lautlehre seit Bechtel (Vienna), ISBN 3-7001-3250-6
- 2005 – Die Fortsetzung der indogermanischen Laryngale im Indo-Iranischen (Vienna), ISBN 3-7001-3476-2
- 2006 – Einiges zu den Skythen, ihrer Sprache, ihrem Nachleben (Vienna), ISBN 3-7001-3731-1
- 2009 – Indogermanistik: Über Darstellungen und Einführungen von den Anfängen bis zur Gegenwart (Vienna), ISBN 3-7001-6603-6

== Decorations and awards ==
- 1982: Culture Prize of the Province of Upper Austria
- 1986: Austrian Decoration for Science and Art
- 1988: Wilhelm Hartel Prize
- 1992: Elected to the American Philosophical Society
- 1993: Elected to the American Academy of Arts and Sciences
- 2004: Cardinal Innitzer Prize
