= Julien Havet =

French historian (1853–1893)

Julien Pierre-Eugène Havet (4 April 1853 – 19 August 1893), French historian, was born at Vitry-sur-Seine, the second son of Ernest Havet.

He early showed a remarkable aptitude for learning, but had a pronounced aversion for pure rhetoric. His studies at the École des chartes (where he took first place both upon entering and leaving) and at the École des Hautes Études did much to develop his critical faculty, and the historical method taught and practiced at these establishments brought home to him the dignity of history, which thenceforth became his ruling passion.

Havet's valedictory thesis at the École des chartes, Série chronologique des gardiens et seigneurs des Îles normandes (1876), was a definitive work, slightly affected by later research. In 1878 he followed his thesis with a study called Les Cours royales dans les Îles normandes. Both works were composed entirely from the original documents at the Public Record Office in London and the archives of Jersey and Guernsey.

On the history of Merovingian institutions, Havet's conclusions were widely accepted (see La Formule N. rex Francor). His first work in this area was Du sens du mot "romain" dans les lois franques (1876), a critical study on a theory of Fustel de Coulanges. In this he claimed that the status of the homo Romanus of the ancient laws was inferior to that of the German freeman; that the Gallo-Romans had been subjected by the Germans to a state of servitude; and, consequently, that the Germans had conquered the Gallo-Romans. He aimed a further blow at Fustel's system by showing that the Frankish kings had never borne the Roman title of vir inluster, and that they could not therefore be considered as being in the first place Roman magistrates; and that in the royal diplomas the king issued his commands as rex Francorum and addressed his functionaries as viri inlustres. His attention having been drawn to questions of authenticity by the forgeries of Denis Vrain-Lucas, Havet devoted himself to tracing the spurious documents that encumbered and perverted Merovingian and Carolingian history. In his A propos des découvertes de Jérome Vignier (1880), he exposed the forgeries committed in the 17th century by this priest.

He then turned his attention to a group of documents relating to ecclesiastical history in the Carolingian period and bearing on the question of false decretals, and produced Les Chartes de St-Calais (1887) and Les Actes de l'évêché du Mans (1894). On the problems afforded by the chronology of Gerbert's letters and by the notes in cipher in the manuscript of his letters, he wrote L'Écriture secrète de Gerbert (1877), which may be compared with his Notes tironiennes dans les diplômes mérovingiens (1885). In 1889 he brought out an edition of Gerbert's letters, which was a model of critical sagacity. Each new work increased his reputation, in Germany as well as France. At the Bibliothèque nationale, where he obtained a post, he rendered great service by his wide knowledge of foreign languages, and read voraciously everything that related, however remotely, to his favourite studies. He was finally appointed assistant curator in the department of printed books.

He died prematurely at Saint-Cloud on 19 August 1893. Posthumously, his published and unpublished writings were collected and, with the exception of Les Cours royales des Îles normandes and Lettres de Gerbert, were published in two volumes called Questions mérovingiennes and Opuscules inédits (1896), containing important papers on diplomatics and on Carolingian and Merovingian history, as well as a large number of short monographs covering a variety of subjects.

Friends of Havet published a collection of his articles under the title Mélanges Havet (1895), pre-fixed by a bibliography of his works compiled by his friend Henri Omont.
