= Mikołaj Kruszewski =

Polish linguist (1851–1887)

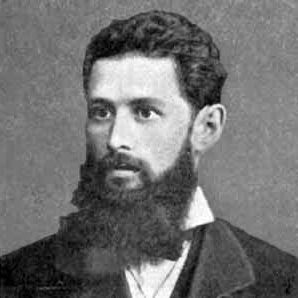
- Born: Mikołaj Habdank Kruszewski; December 18, 1851; Lutsk, Russian Empire
- Died: November 12, 1887 (aged 35); Kazan, Russian Empire
- Other name: Nikolay Vyacheslavovich Krushevsky
- Occupation: Linguist
- Known for: First synchronic definition of the phoneme Kazan School
- Spouse: Julia née Hankiewicz (m. 1875)

Academic background
- Education: University of Warsaw (MA); Kazan University (MA, PhD)
- Thesis: Outline of Linguistic Science (1883)
- Doctoral advisor: Jan Baudouin de Courtenay

Academic work
- Discipline: Linguistics
- Sub-discipline: Historical linguistics, phonology
- Institutions: Kazan University

Mikołaj Habdank Kruszewski (Note: Polish pronunciation: [mʲikɔwai̯ kruˈʂɛfskʲi]; Russianized: Никола́й Вячесла́вович Круше́вский, romanized: Nikolay Vyacheslavovich Krushevsky) (18 December 1851 – 12 November 1887) was a Polish linguist active in the Russian Empire. Kruszewski was a student and colleague of Jan Baudouin de Courtenay at Kazan University, where they developed the Kazan school of linguistics.

Kruszewski was born on December 18, 1851 in Lutsk, then part of the Russian Empire, to a Polish noble family. He received schooling in Lutsk and Chełm before studying history and philosophy at the University of Warsaw. After graduating, Kruszewski married Julia Hankiewicz, with whom he would eventually have four children. Kruszewski taught languages in the town of Troitsk from 1875 until 1878, when he started at Kazan University as a graduate student. At Kazan, Kruszewski developed his theory of alternations and jointly invented the modern concept of the phoneme with Baudouin de Courtenay. After publishing his doctoral dissertation Outline of Linguistic Science in 1883, he succeeded Baudouin de Courtenay as professor and Chair of Indo-European at Kazan University.

In 1884, Kruszewski became ill with a neurodegenerative disease, which resulted in his death in 1887 at the age of 35. Kruszewski's scholarship was generally poorly received by his contemporaries, and details about his life and work received little attention from Western scholars until efforts by the Russian linguist Roman Jakobson in the late 20th century.

== Early life and education ==
Kruszewski's coat of arms

Mikołaj Habdank Kruszewski was born on December 18, 1851 in Lutsk, Volhynia, at the time within the Russian Empire. His father, Wacław Kruszewski, came from a szlachta (Polish noble) family, and bore the Abdank coat of arms. Wacław began his career as a military officer in the uhlan regiments of Congress Poland, participating in the November Uprising of 1831. He later entered the civil service, serving as governor of various towns in the Volyn Governorate, including Ostroh, Ovruch, Lutsk, and Kovel. Mikołaj Kruszewski's mother, Rozalia Ihnatiivna Kruszewska (née Notken), came from a German merchant family. Wacław and Rozalia Kruszewski had five children, of which Mikołaj was the eldest. Mikołaj had three brothers, Wincenty-Eliasz, Klemens, and Aleksander-Albert, and a sister, Maria. Mikołaj was named after St. Nicholas, the patron saint of Lutsk.

In 1862, Kruszewski started his primary education at Lutsk District Noble School. During this period, he regularly traveled between a rented residence in Lutsk and at his mother's estate in Solotvyn, where his family had moved after his father's retirement. In Solotvyn, Kruszewski acquired the Ukrainian language and learned about Ukrainian folklore, which he later studied academically.

In 1866, Kruszewski continued his studies at the Greek Catholic gymnasium in Chełm. In 1871, he passed examinations in Latin, Greek, and Russian, as well as general and Russian history. He was admitted into the Faculty of History and Philology at the University of Warsaw and took an interest in analytic philosophy under the influence of the Russian philosopher Matvey Troitsky In 1875, Kruszewski graduated from the University of Warsaw; his graduation thesis, Incantations as a Genre of Russian Folk Poetry, (Note: Russian: Заговоры, как вид русской народной поэзии, romanized: Zagovory, kak vid russkoy narodnoy poezii) was published in the university's journal in the following year.

== Career ==
At Warsaw, the Slavist Mitrofan Kolosov suggested that Kruszewski should pursue graduate study either under Alexander Potebnja in Kharkiv or under Jan Baudouin de Courtenay in Kazan. Kruszewski chose Baudouin, likely because Baudouin was also Polish and had also studied at Warsaw as an undergraduate. In the summer of 1875, Kruszewski applied for admission as a graduate student at Kazan University, but was unsuccessful. However, Nikolay Mikhailovich Blagoveshchensky—then rector of the University of Warsaw—and the classicist Ivan Tsvetaev helped Kruszewski find a job as a teacher of classical languages in the town of Troitsk, near Orenburg.

Kruszewski taught in Troitsk between 1875 and 1878, during which he kept correspondence with Baudouin, studying Indo-European linguistics and Sanskrit under his guidance. By 1878, Kruszewski had saved up enough money to afford graduate study at Kazan without requiring a stipend from the university, which in 1875 he had been unable to obtain from either Kazan or Warsaw. Kruszewski was appointed to the position of "candidate for a faculty position without a professorial fellowship", which the linguist Joanna Radwańska-Williams describes as "enter[ing] the system through the back door by the force of his own determination".

Upon arriving in Kazan, Kruszewski's relationship with Baudouin became the closest among Baudouin's students. Baudouin was unusual for his advocacy of his students' careers, but he was especially active in his efforts to accelerate Kruszewski's on account Kruszewski's ambitions and financial situation. In addition to the Sanskrit and Indo-European material required by the university, Baudouin organized private lessons for Kruszewski in his own home, spending between eight to ten hours per week on topics including readings of the Rigveda and Lithuanian folktales, exercises in Slavic dialectology, and discussion of contemporary works in linguistics. These sessions soon grew into what is now known as the Kazan Linguistic Circle, attracting many of Baudouin's other students and even the Turkologist Wilhelm Radloff, who already held an administrative position at Kazan. Baudouin also secured a scholarship for Kruszewski for his second year at Kazan.

Over his first academic year, Kruszewski focused his studies on Sanskrit and Indo-European, publishing translations of several hymns from the Rigveda into Russian. He decided to study Sanskrit verbs as the subject of his master's thesis. In 1879, Kruszewski produced a short article from his study of Sanskrit verbs titled "Observations on Certain Phonetic Phenomena Connected with Accentuation". (Note: Russian: Наблюдения над некоторыми фонетическими явлениями, связанными с акцентуацией, romanized: Nablyudeniya nad nekotorymi foneticheskimi yavleniyami, svyazannymi s aktsentuatsiyey) He received a candidate's degree for the paper, and submitted it as qualification for a position as a salaried lecturer (privat-docent), which he obtained in the following year, teaching phonetics and Sanskrit.

In 1880, Kruszewski came upon Swiss linguist Ferdinand de Saussure's Mémoire (Note: French: Mémoire sur le système primitif des voyelles dans les langues indo-européenes ('A Dissertation on the Primitive System of Vowels in the Indo-European Languages')) on the Proto-Indo-European vowel system, which had been published in 1879. The Mémoire accounted for the previously inexplicable inconsistent correspondence between the vowel a in Sanskrit and the vowels e, o, and a in other Indo-European languages, among other problems. Kruszewski wrote a review of Saussure's Mémoire praising its analysis and novel methodology. Thus, he considered the problem of Indo-European vowels solved, and changed the topic of his master's thesis to applying Saussure's reconstruction of Proto-Indo-European vowels to the study of Old Church Slavonic. In May 1881, Kruszewski defended his master's thesis, On the Question of the Guna. (Note: Russian: К вопросу о гуне, romanized: K voprosu o gune) Baudouin praised the thesis in presenting Kruszewski to the department as a candidate for the position of docent, saying that it "sheds completely new light on many linguistic phenomena" and that "in the Russian scientific literature until now there [has been] nothing like it".

Although the linguistic scholarship at Kazan was developing rapidly, both Baudouin and Kruszewski felt Kazan to be too remote and inhospitable. Shortly before he obtained docentship in Kazan, Kruszewski inquired in private about the possibility of docentship at Kyiv University, complaining that he and his family were so ill-suited for Kazan's climate that affording medicine for their constant sickness had become a significant financial burden. However, due to Russification policies of the empire, Kruszewski was not allowed to be employed at Kyiv because he was a Catholic from the Kingdom of Poland. Meanwhile, Baudouin went on sabbatical leave in the academic year 1881–1882, during which he traveled around the major centers of linguistics in western Europe. At the Paris Linguistic Society, Baudouin presented recent works by Kazan linguists, including Kruszewski's master's thesis. In Baudouin's absence, his teaching and administrative duties back in Kazan began to fall onto Kruszewski.

Facing the prospect of Baudouin's departure from Kazan, Kruszewski wrote his doctoral thesis over the academic year 1882–1883 under time pressure. In May 1883, he defended the thesis, Outline of Linguistic Science, (Note: Russian: Очерк науки о языке, romanized: Ocherk nauki o yazyke) which earned him the position of ekstraordinarny professor. With Kruszewski's education complete, Baudouin left Kazan for the University of Dorpat (now Tartu, Estonia), leaving Kruszewski to succeed him as chair of Indo-European at Kazan. In addition to Indo-European and Sanskrit, which he had already been teaching, Kruszewski also taught phonetics, the comparative grammar of Romance languages, the history of French, Russian grammar, and general linguistics.

== Illness and death ==
In 1884, Kruszewski's health began to decline, and he did not publish anything over the 1883–1884 academic year. In the spring of 1884, he suffered a fever. This was followed by insomnia, memory loss, and tremors that rendered him unable to write. By the start of 1885, Kruszewski reported feeling suicidal and approaching insanity. Later in the year, he was promoted to the rank of ordinarny professor, but he was unable to continue teaching. His illness further worsened, developing hallucinations and losses of consciousness. In February 1886, it became apparent that Kruszewski's illness was terminal, so he resigned his positions at the University of Kazan. He spent the remainder of his life at the mental hospital in Kazan, dying on November 12, 1887. He was buried at the Catholic cemetery in Kazan. Although Kruszewski had been initially diagnosed with neurasthenia (mental exhaustion) and treated with electro-shock therapy, his symptoms suggest that he was likely suffering from neurodegeneration caused by tertiary syphilis, which was frequently misdiagnosed for neurasthenia at the time.

== Scholarship ==
Due to Kruszewski's background in philosophy and logic, his linguistic scholarship was markedly theoretical compared to that of his peers. He frequently introduced theoretical distinctions and coined corresponding terminology, although few of his coinages have survived. Along with his teacher Baudouin de Courtenay, Kruszewski is generally considered one of the founders of modern phonology.

Kruszewski's theory of alternations classifies them into three types distinguished by two factors: the sounds that alternate and the conditions under which each one occurs. On these bases, alternations may differ from each other and be classified in a variety of ways. Kruszewski's typology includes three basic categories. Sounds related by an alternation of the first category, or divergents, are considered by Kruszewski to be variants of the same sound, as opposed to those related by alternations of the second or third category. The different sounds that participate in alternations of the latter two types are called correlatives, and the two are similar to each other compared to divergences.

=== The phoneme ===
Kruszewski was the first to introduce the term phoneme in Kazan, having borrowed it from Saussure, who used the term phoneme as an equivalent for the phonetic notion of "speech sound". Kruszewski took the notion of phoneme from Saussure's early work on Indo-European, specifically from the Mémoire. Saussure's use of phonème in that work referred to a historical unit: a hypothesized sound in the proto-language ancestral to a given language family, together with its reflexes in each of the daughter languages. A phoneme understood in this way is essentially an individual correspondence set, as one would identify these in the course of a historical investigation. If a single sound undergoes various sound changes in various environments, the resulting sounds remain members of the same phoneme in this sense, regardless of their phonetic similarity.

Kruszewski took over this notion and recast it in synchronic terms, as with Saussure's usage, to a unit established by systematic comparison, but within a single language rather than across a family. In comparing instances of the same morphological unit in different words or families of words, one may find an alternation among distinct but related sounds: sounds that are related historically but no longer identical, being linked by the morphological relation between associated categories. This is the basis of a phoneme in a new sense: a set of alternating sounds occupying parallel positions within the same morphological unit in different families of words.

== Personal life ==
Kruszewski married Julia (née Hankiewicz) in 1875, immediately after he graduated from the University of Warsaw. Julia was well educated, knew Greek, was interested in French and Polish literature, and later helped Kruszewski with academic work. The couple's first child, Wacława, was born in 1878 in Troitsk and baptized in Kazan, with Baudouin as her godfather. She became a teacher and died in 1958. Kruszewski's second daughter, Stanisława, was born in 1879. She also became a teacher, dying in 1944 after being captured during the Warsaw Uprising. In 1884, Julia and Mikołaj Kruszewski had a son, Marian Oskar, who died in 1916 fighting in World War I. Kruszewski's fourth child, Berta-Justyna, was born in 1885, and also died during the Warsaw Uprising in 1944.

== Legacy ==
References to Kruszewski in subsequent linguistic scholarship have been limited, partially because his work has been difficult to access, being mostly written in Russian. From his death in 1887 until 2012, his work was not reprinted, and his personal archive was not preserved. Kruszewski's ideas were also poorly received by Slavists at the time, with Eastern European scholars such as Vatroslav Jagić and Aleksander Brückner criticizing his focus on formalisms and theory-building over the interpretation of data. Kruszewski's works were similarly received by Western scholars, with the exception of the German linguist Friedrich Techmer, who gave a favorable review of Kruszewski's On Sound Alternation and published the German translation of Outline of Linguistic Science.

Kruszewski's work started to receive more attention in the latter half of the 20th century due to efforts by the Russian linguist Roman Jakobson, who described Kruszewski as "one of the greatest theoreticians of language among the world's linguists of the late nineteenth century". However, Kruszewski was still overshadowed by Baudouin, whose work had been subject to considerably more studies, as Baudouin published more throughout his longer life. English-language information about Kruszewski remained scarce until Radwańska-Williams published her monograph about him in 1993. By 2012, there had been a total of two monographs, three doctoral dissertations, and around fifty scientific articles on Kruszewski's works.

== Selected works ==
- Kruszewski, Mikołaj (1876). "Zagovory, kak vid russkoy narodnoy poezii" Заговоры как вид русской народной поэзии [Charms as a species of Russian folk poetry]. Varshavskie universitetskie izvestiya (3): 3–69. OCLC 1235452278.
- Kruszewski, Mikołaj (1879a). "Nablyudeniya nad nekotorymi foneticheskimi yavleniyami, svyazannymi s aktsentuatsiyey" Наблюдения над некоторыми фонетическими явлениями, связанными с акцентуацие [Observations on some phonetic phenomena related to accentuation]. Uchenyya Zapiski Imperatorskago Kazanskago Universiteta. 46 (1): 105–114. OCLC 833923052.
- Kruszewski, Mikołaj (1879b). "Ob 'analogie' i 'narodnoy etimologii ("Volksetymologie")" Об "аналогии" и "народной этимологии" ("Volksetymologie") [On 'analogy' and 'folk etymology' ('Volksetymologie')]. Russky filologichesky vestnik. 2 (3): 109–122.
- Kruszewski, Mikołaj (1881). "K voprosu o gune. Issledovaniye v oblasti staroslavyanskogo vokalizma" К вопросу о гуне: Исследование в области старославянского вокализма [On the issue of guna: A study of Old Church Slavonic vocalism]. Russky filologichesky vestnik. 5 (1): 1–109. OCLC 831108039.
- Kruszewski, Mikołaj (1883). "Ocherk nauki o yazyke" Очерк науки о языке [An Outline of Linguistic Science]. Uchenyya Zapiski Imperatorskago Kazanskago Universiteta. 50 (1). OCLC 83282601.

=== Translations ===
- Kruszewski, Mikołaj (1967). Wybór pism [Selected writings] (in Polish). Translated by Jerzy Kuryłowicz; Krystyna Pomorska. Wrocław-Warszawa-Kraków: Zakład narodowy im. Ossolińskich. OCLC 3170927.
- Kruszewski, Mikołaj (1995). E. F. K. Koerner (ed.). Writings in general linguistics: On Sound Alternation (1881) and Outline of Linguistic Science (1883). Amsterdam Classics in Linguistics. Vol. 11. Amsterdam: John Benjamins. doi:10.1075/acil.11. ISBN 978-90-272-0977-1.
