= Eugène Auguste Ernest Havet =

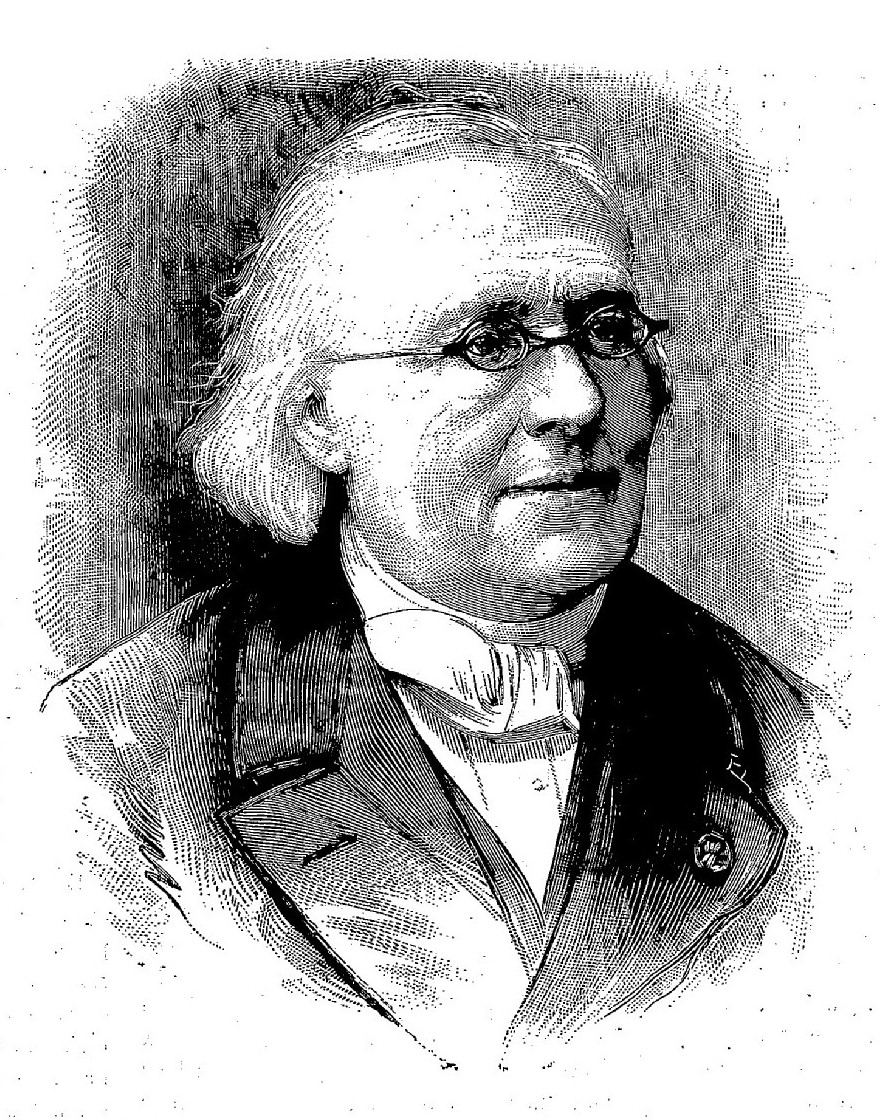
Ernest Havet

Eugène Auguste Ernest Havet (April 11, 1813 – December 21, 1889), French scholar, was born in Paris. He was the father of Pierre Antoine Louis Havet and Julien Havet.

Educated at the Lycée Saint-Louis and the Ecole Normale, he was for many years before his death professor of Latin eloquence at the Collège de France.

His two capital works were a commentary on the works of Pascal, Pensées de Pascal, publiées dans le texte authentique, avec un commentaire suivi et une étude littéraire (1852; 2nd ed. 2 vols., 1881), and Le Christianisme et ses origines (4 vols., 1871–1884), the chief thesis of which was that Christianity owed more to Greek philosophy than to the writings of the Hebrew prophets.
