= August Leskien =

German linguist (1840–1916)

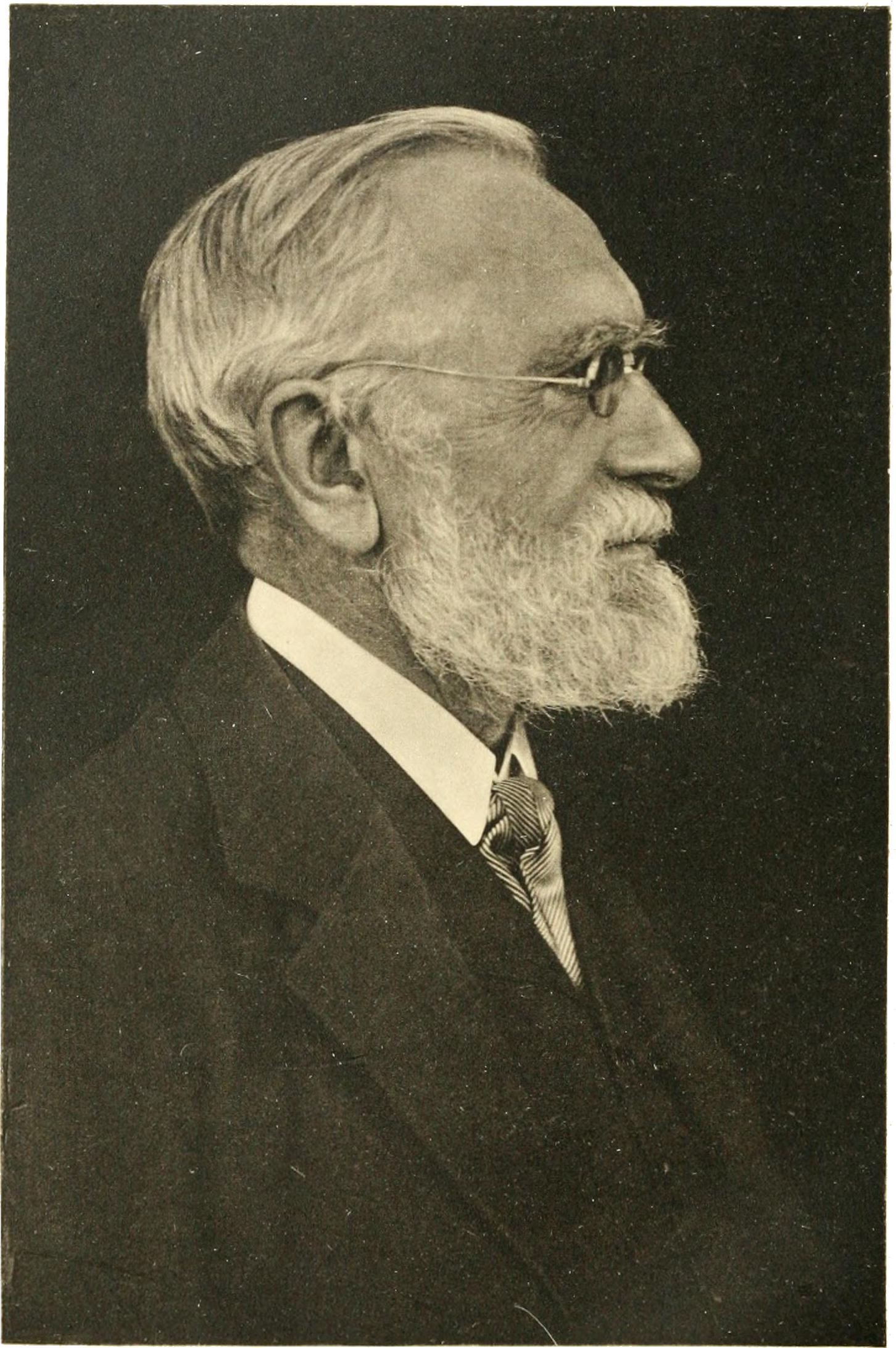
- Born: 8 July 1840; Kiel, Duchy of Holstein, German Confederation
- Died: 20 September 1916 (aged 76); Leipzig, Kingdom of Saxony, German Empire

Academic background
- Education: University of Leipzig
- Doctoral advisor: Georg Curtius
- Other advisor: August Schleicher

Academic work
- School or tradition: Neogrammarian
- Institutions: University of Jena; University of Leipzig
- Doctoral students: Jan Baudouin de Courtenay
- Main interests: Indo-European studies, Baltic and Slavic languages

Signature
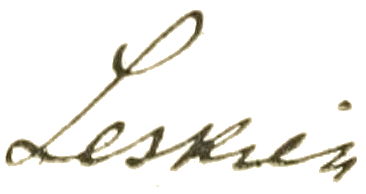

August Leskien (German: [ˈaʊɡʊst lɛsˈkiːn]; 8 July 1840 – 20 September 1916) was a German linguist who studied comparative linguistics, particularly relating to the Baltic and Slavic languages.

== Biography ==
Leskien was born in Kiel. He studied philology at the universities of Kiel and Leipzig, receiving his doctorate from the latter in 1864. He taught Latin and Ancient Greek at the Thomasschule zu Leipzig from 1864 to 1866. In 1866, he began studying comparative linguistics under August Schleicher at the University of Jena. He completed his habilitation in 1867 and then lectured at the University of Göttingen.

He was appointed as extraordinary professor (außerordentlicher Professor) of comparative linguistics and Sanskrit at Jena in 1868. Two years later, he was named as the extraordinary professor of Slavic philology at the University of Leipzig, where he delivered the first course there in Slavic languages. He was promoted to full professorship (ordentlicher Professor) in 1876 and retained the job until 1915.

In 1884 he became an editor of Ersch and Gruber's Realencyklopädie. Leskien was a founding member of the journal Archiv für slavische Philologie. He died in Leipzig.

== Research, writings and thought ==
Leskien was one of the most important of the group of linguists at Leipzig who became known later as the Neogrammarians. The group strove to develop linguistics in a scientific manner; Leskien formulated their main doctrine, namely that phonetic laws do not have exceptions (Ausnahmslosigkeit der Lautgesetze). Leskien's hypothesis was that phonetic shifts do not occur randomly or haphazardly, but instead are the product of directly observable conditions. Among the students that Leskien taught were: Jan Niecisław Baudouin de Courtenay, Ferdinand de Saussure, Leonard Bloomfield, Nikolai Trubetzkoy, Karl Verner and Adolf Noreen. Thus Leskien can be seen as a major developer of modern comparative linguistics, particularly with respect to the Baltic and Slavic languages.

In his 1881 essay Die Quantitätsverhältnisse im Auslaut des Litauischen, Leskien formulated Leskien's law, a sound law devised to describe a particular aspect of sound change in Lithuanian. According to this principle long vowels, along with the diphthongs ie and uo, with an acute intonation are shortened in the final syllable of a word. Leskien is also the author of Handbuch der altbulgarischen Sprache, a guide to the language Old Church Slavonic (3rd ed. 1898; 8th, revised and enlarged edition 1962). Although superseded partly by more recent studies, the book is still in print and remains in use by scholars presently. With Karl Brugmann, he edited Litauische Volkslieder und Märchen (“Lithuanian Folk Songs and Tales”; 1882).

Other works include:

- Indogermanische Chrestomathie, with Ebel, Schleicher, and Schmidt (1869)
- Die Deklination im Slawisch-Litauischen und Germanischen (1876)
- Untersuchungen über Quantität und Betonung in den slawischen Sprachen (1885–93)
- Die Bildung der Nomina im Litauischen (1891)
- Grammatik der altbulgarischen (altkirchenslavischen) Sprache (1909)
- Grammatik der serbo-kroatischen Sprache (1914)
