= Armand Havet =

French botanist

- Born: Armand Étienne Maurice Havet; 1795; Rouen, France
- Died: 1 July 1820 (aged about 25); Yvoudron, Madagascar
- Citizenship: French
- Known for: Studies of the flora of Madagascar
- Scientific career
- Fields: Botany
- Institutions: Madagascar

Armand Étienne Maurice Havet, born in 1795 in Rouen and died in 1820 in Yvoudron (Madagascar), was a French medical doctor, anatomist, traveller and botanist. His brother, Nicole Havet, was then governor of Île Bourbon (now called La Réunion)

== Biography ==
Armand Havet began his studies in his home town and completed them in Paris, where he studied medicine, anatomy, natural history and above all, botany. Winner of a special competition on 4 May 1819, he was appointed government naturalist-voyager. After receiving his doctorate in medicine, he chose Madagascar as the destination for his scientific journey. He embarked on 24 January 1820 with his half-brother Mr. Nicole and the naturalist Godefroy on the barge La Panthère, and he landed on 8 June 1820 in the harbour of Tamatave. On the 16th, he set off for Emyrne, residence of Radama I, king of Madagascar. During his expedition he made notes on the plants and other natural productions of the region, on their use, as well as on the manners, customs of the inhabitants, the topographical and physical layout of the places while his brother made several drawings of men, animals and sites. Unfortunately, the plants could not be preserved and were only referred to by their Malagasy names, so it was almost impossible to take advantage of them. After a week of expedition, Havet's brother fell ill. The next day, Armand Havet also fell ill on his return from a herbalizing trip. Urgently brought back to the coast, he succumbed the night of his arrival in the village of Yvoudron. His body was transported to Tamatave, where he was buried with great pageantry.

== Works ==
- Le dictionnaire des ménages : ou, Recueil de recettes et d'instructions pour l'économie domestique, Paris, Blanchard, 1822
- Le moniteur médical, ou secours et remèdes à donner avant l'arrivée du médecin, Paris, Blanchard, 1820
