= Feeding order =

Relation between rules in linguistics

In phonology and historical linguistics, feeding order of phonological rules refers to a situation in which the application of a rule A creates new contexts in which a rule B can apply; it would not have been possible for rule B to apply otherwise.

Suppose there are two rules. Rule A takes in input x and returns output y. Rule B takes in input y and returns input z. When rule B is applied to input x, it will return the same output (x). The following order is called a feeding order:

1. A: x→y
2. B: y→z

The opposite of feeding order, the situation in which rule A destroys a certain context so rule B can no longer apply, is called bleeding order.

== Example ==
An example of feeding order can be seen in English.

Rule A is fortis stop insertion, which inserts voiceless plosives into consonant cluster codas consisting of nasals and voiceless fricatives.

A: ∅→[-son, -cont, -del rel, -voi, αplace] / [+nasal] _ [-son, +cont, -voi, αplace]

Rule B is preglottalization, which glottalizes voiceless stops in word-final codas. As a consequence of this rule, all voiceless plosives which make part of a word-final consonant cluster are glottalized.

B: [-son, -cont, -del rel, -voi] → [+constricted glottis]/ _ (C)#

In English, rule A precedes rule B. We can derive the surface form of prince by applying the rules to the underlying form /prɪns/ (x in the generalization above). Using rule A, /prɪns/ becomes prɪnts (y in the generalization above); using rule B, which can now be applied as there is a voiceless stop in a word-final coda, prɪnts becomes prɪnʔts. Thus, the final output form of both rules is [prɪnʔts] (z in the generalization above).

Since rule A created a phonological context in which rule B could apply and because rule B could not apply without the application of rule A, the two rules are in feeding order; that is, rule A feeds rule B.

== Counterfeeding order ==
If the order of rules which are in feeding order is reversed, this is said to be a counterfeeding order.

If we have two rules, rule A which looks like x → y and rule B which looks like y → z the following is a counterfeeding order:

1. B: y→z
2. A: x→y

An example of this can be seen in French, where petite nièce ("little niece") is pronounced [pətit njɛs]. If the rule which deletes word-final /-ə/ in French had been applied before another rule which deletes word-final consonants before another consonant, this would have been an example of feeding order and the "final output" form (surface form) would have been [pəti njɛs] instead.

A counter-feeding order very often creates phonological opacity. In the given case, it is the application of the rule deleting word-final consonants which has thus become opaque in French.

In historical linguistics, a sequence of rules in counterfeeding order is called a chain shift. A chain shift can be presented graphically like the following:

- a→b→c→d

where only one rule can apply. The result is that what was originally a becomes b, what was originally b becomes c, what was originally c becomes d, etc. In essence, each sound "shifts" one position to the right. A good example of such a chain shift occurred as part of the Great Vowel Shift, which took place historically in English starting around 1500 AD. The long front vowels were raised one position, and the original high front vowel became a diphthong:

- /aː/→/ɛː/→/eː/→/iː/→/əi/

== See also ==
- Bleeding order
- Markedness
- Optimality theory
- Order of operations
