= Bleeding order =

Relation between rules in linguistics

Bleeding order is a term used in phonology to describe specific interactions of phonological rules. The term was introduced in 1968 by Paul Kiparsky. If two phonological rules are said to be in bleeding order, the application of the first rule creates a context in which the second rule can no longer apply.

The opposite of this is called feeding order.

== Examples ==
An example of this in English is the /ɪ/-insertion between a voiceless alveolar fricative and a plural-z, as in buses [bʌsɪz] (with the underlying representation //bʌs-z//). English also has a rule which devoices segments after voiceless consonants, as in books [bʊks], with the underlying representation //bʊk-z//). In the output form [bʌsɪz] buses, final devoicing has not applied, because the phonological context in which this rule could have applied has been destroyed by the application of /ɪ/-insertion. Put differently, the application order "(1) /ɪ/-insertion (2) final devoicing" is a bleeding order in English.

== Counterbleeding order ==
If two rules which would have a bleeding relationship in one order actually apply in the opposite order, the latter is called a counterbleeding order. An example of this can be seen in the pronunciation of the diminutive of the word slang ("snake") in the Dutch dialect of Kaatsheuvel: [slɑŋəskə]. If [s]-insertion had applied first, then the rule which inserts an additional /-ə/ between the noun stem and the suffix /-kə/ could no longer have applied and the output form would have been [slɑŋskə]. However, the rules have applied in the reverse order.

== See also ==
- Feeding order
- Markedness
- Optimality theory
- Phonological opacity

== Literature ==
- Gussenhoven, C. & Jacobs, H. (1998). Understanding Phonology. London: Arnold.
- Jensen, J. T. (2004).Principles of Generative Phonology: An introduction.

Amsterdam: J. Benjamins ISBN 978-90-272-7517-2.
