= Phonological rule =

Concept in linguistics

A phonological rule is a formal way of expressing a systematic phonological or morphophonological process in linguistics. Phonological rules are commonly used in generative phonology as a notation to capture sound-related operations and computations the human brain performs when producing or comprehending spoken language. They may use phonetic notation or distinctive features or both.

John Goldsmith (1995) defines phonological rules as mappings between two different levels of sounds representation—in this case, the abstract or underlying level and the surface level—and Bruce Hayes (2009) describes them as "generalizations" about the different ways a sound can be pronounced in different environments. That is to say, phonological rules describe how a speaker goes from the abstract representation stored in their brain, to the actual sound they articulate when they speak. In general, phonological rules start with the underlying representation of a sound (the phoneme that is stored in the speaker's mind) and yield the final surface form, or what the speaker actually pronounces. When an underlying form has multiple surface forms, this is often referred to as allophony. For example, the English plural written -s may be pronounced as [s] (in "cats"), [z] (in "cabs", "peas"), or as [əz] (in "buses"); these forms are all theorized to be stored mentally as the same -s, but the surface pronunciations are derived through a series of phonological rules.

The term phonological rule may also refer to a diachronic sound change in historical linguistics.

== Format and notation ==
In most dialects of American English, speakers have a process known as intervocalic flapping that changes the consonants /t/ and /d/ into a quick flap consonant ([ɾ]) in words such as "butter" [ˈbʌɾɹ] and "notable" [ˈnoʊɾəbl]. The stop consonants /t/ and /d/ only become a flap in between two vowels, where the first vowel is stressed and the second is stressless. It is common to represent phonological rules using formal rewrite rules in the most general way possible. Thus, the intervocalic alveolar flapping described above can be formalized as:

Intervocalic flapping in American English

The rule given above for intervocalic alveolar flapping describes what sound is changed, what the sound changes to, and where the change happens (in other words, what the environment is that triggers the change). The illustration below presents the same rule, with each of its parts labelled and described.

Intervocalic flapping in American English

1. Title of the rule
2. The underlying sound that is changed. In this example, the brackets represent all the features the changed sounds have in common; /t/ and /d/ are both stop consonants and both articulated with the tongue touching the alveolar ridge. Therefore, this rule applies to all sounds that share those features (in English, only /t/ and /d/). Rules can be written with just the individual sound to be changed, but using square bracket notation allows the rule to apply to a class of related sounds. (Note: See Place of articulation and Manner of articulation for a description of these terms.) Suggestions for refining the traditional notation to better reflect the set theoretic types of segments and natural classes are made in some recent work.
3. The arrow represents that the sound on the left changes to have the features on the right.
4. The sound that /t/ and /d/ (in this example) change to, or the individual features that change.
5. The slash is a shorthand notation for "in the environment where...". It means that the notation to the right describes where the phonological rule is applied.
6. The sound, or the features of the sound, that precedes the one to be changed. In this example, the /t/ or /d/ that becomes flapped must be preceded by a stressed vowel.
7. The location of the sound that is going to be changed. In this example, the underline means that the /t/ or /d/ that becomes flapped must be in between two vowels (where the first is stressed and the second is not).
8. The sound, or the features of the sound, that follows the one to be changed. In this example, the /t/ or /d/ that becomes flapped must be followed by an unstressed vowel.
9. A prose description of the rule, specifying when it applies and what it changes.

Taken together and read from left to right, this notation of the rule for intervocalic alveolar flapping states that any alveolar stop consonant (/t/ or /d/) becomes a tap ([ɾ]) in the environment where it is preceded by a stressed vowel and followed by an unstressed one.

Phonological rules are often written using distinctive features, which are (supposedly (Note: Some phonologists have questioned the "naturalness" or "innateness" of distinctive features.)) natural characteristics that describe the acoustic and articulatory makeup of a sound; by selecting a particular bundle, or "matrix," of features, it is possible to represent a group of sounds that form a natural class and pattern together in phonological rules. For example, in the rule above, rather than writing /t/ and /d/ separately, phonologists may write the features that they have in common, thus capturing the whole set of sounds that are stop consonants and are pronounced by placing the tongue against the alveolar ridge. In the most commonly used feature system, the features to represent these sounds would be [+delayed release, +anterior, -distributed], which describe the manner of articulation and the position and shape of the tongue when pronouncing these two sounds. But rules are not always written using features; in some cases, especially when the rule applies only to a single sound, rules are written using the symbols of the International Phonetic Alphabet.

== Characteristics ==
Hayes (2009) lists the following characteristics that all phonological rules have in common:

- Language specificity: A phonological rule that is present in one language may not be present in other languages, or even in all dialects of a given language.
- Productivity: Phonological rules apply even to new words. For example, if an English speaker is asked to pronounce the plural of the nonsense word "wug" (i.e. "wugs"), they pronounce the final s as [z], not [s], even though they have never used the word before.
- Untaught and subconscious: Speakers apply these rules without being aware of it, and they acquire the rules early in life without any explicit teaching.
- Intuitive: The rules give speakers intuitions about what words are "well-formed" or "acceptable"; if a speaker hears a word that does not conform to the language's phonological rules, the word will sound foreign or ill-formed.

== Types ==
Phonological rules can be roughly divided into four types:

- Assimilation: When a sound changes one of its features to be more similar to an adjacent sound. This is the kind of rule that occurs in the English plural rule described above—the -s becomes voiced or voiceless depending on whether or not the preceding consonant is voiced.
- Dissimilation: When a sound changes one of its features to become less similar to an adjacent sound, usually to make the two sounds more distinguishable. This type of rule is often seen among people speaking a language that is not their native language, where the sound contrasts may be difficult.
- Insertion: When an extra sound is added between two others. This also occurs in the English plural rule: when the plural morpheme z is added to "bus," "bus-z" would be unpronounceable for most English speakers, so a short vowel (the schwa, [ə]) is inserted between [s] and the [z].
- Deletion: When a sound, such as a stress-less syllable or a weak consonant, is not pronounced; for example, most American English speakers do not pronounce the [d] in "handbag".

== Rule ordering ==
According to Jensen, when the application of one particular rule generates a phonological or morphological form that triggers an altogether different rule, resulting in an incorrect surface form, rule ordering is required.

=== Types of rule ordering ===
Given two rules, A and B, if we assume that both are equally valid rules, then their ordering will fall into one of the following categories:

- Feeding: the application of A creates the opportunity for B to apply.
- Bleeding: the application of A prevents B from being able to apply.
- Counterfeeding: the application of B creates the opportunity for A
- Counterbleeding: the application of B prevents A from being able to apply.

=== Derivations ===
When a distinct order between two rules is required, a derivation must be shown. The derivation must consist of a correct application of rule ordering that proves the phonetic representation to be possible as well as a counterexample that proves, given the opposite ordering, an incorrect phonetic representation will be generated.

==== Example derivation ====
Below is an example of a derivation of rule ordering in Russian as presented by Jensen. Given the following rules with rule 1 applying before rule 2:

1. $l \rightarrow \emptyset / \text{C}$___# (l-Deletion)
2. $\left [ -\text{sonorant} \right ] \rightarrow \left [ -\text{voice} \right]/$___ # (Final Devoicing)

Correct derivation:

1. /#greb+l#/ (underlying representation)
  - greb (application of l-deletion)
  - grep (application of final devoicing)
2. [grep*=] (correct phonetic representation)

Incorrect derivation:

1. /#greb+l#/ (underlying representation)
  - ------ (application of final devoicing)
  - greb (application of l-deletion)
2. *[greb] (incorrect phonetic representation)

== Expanded notation ==
On their own, phonological rules are intended to be comprehensive statements about sound changes in a language. However, languages are rarely uniform in the way they change these sounds. For a formal analysis, it is often required to implement notation conventions in addition to those previously introduced to account for the variety of changes that occur as simply as possible.

- Subscripts and superscripts indicate the number of consecutive occurrences of a phoneme.
  - $X^n_m$ indicates that $X$ occurs no less than $m$ and no more than $n$ times consecutively where $n$ and $m \geq 0$.
- Morpheme boundaries indicate the left and right boundaries that, between them contain a complete morpheme, represented with a plus sign ⟨+⟩. For example, the word "cats" can be written as ⟨+cat+s+⟩, where each plus sign indicates a morpheme boundary.
- Word boundaries indicate the left and right boundaries that, between them contain a complete word, represented with a hash sign ⟨#⟩. For example, the word "cat" can be written ⟨#cat#⟩, where the left hash indicates the beginning of the word and the right indicates its end.
- Syllable boundaries indicate the left and right boundaries that, between them contain a complete syllable, represented with a lowercase sigma ⟨σ⟩ (in older literature, with a dollar/peso sign ⟨$⟩).
- Curly braces {...} indicate a logical-disjunction relationship of two expressions. For example:
  - The two expressions, ABD and AED and be written with curly braces as:
    - $A\begin{Bmatrix} B \\ E \end{Bmatrix}D$, A is followed by either B or E and then D.
- Parentheses (...) indicate a logical-disjunction relationship of two expressions and an abbreviated version of the curly braces notation, while maintaining the same disjunctive relationship function. For example,
  - The two expressions, ABD and AD can be written with parentheses as:
    - $A(B)D$, B is optionally permitted to come between A and D.
- Angled brackets ⟨...⟩ indicate a conditional relationship within a set. For example, vowel harmony in Turkish:
  - $$\begin{bmatrix} +\text{syll} \\
\langle+\text{high}\rangle \end{bmatrix} \rightarrow
\begin{bmatrix} \alpha \text{ back} \\ \langle \beta \text{ round} \rangle \end{bmatrix}
/
\begin{bmatrix} +\text{syll} \\ \alpha \text{ back} \\ \beta \text{ round} \end{bmatrix} C_0$$
    __ , All vowels will take on the [+/- back] value of the vowel that precedes it, regardless of the number of intervening consonants. If a vowel is [+ high], it will also take on the [+/- round] value of the preceding vowel, regardless of the number of intervening consonants.

== Alpha notation ==
If two rules are identical except for values of same features, then the two rules can be replaced by a single rule, and values replaced by alpha (α) variables in the new rule.

When one single variable is used, it is called explicit algebraic variable (mathematical function formulated as y=f(x), where the output variable "y" as dependent variable that can be explicitly written only in terms of its independent variable input "x").

"α" is a placeholder for positive (+) or negative (-) sign, denoting that the feature where it's attached next to can, respectively, be or not present. Thus, for example, a feature statement like [α round] can mean [+round] or [-round], but the alpha variable(s) used in a rule must match. If alpha is used in a rule, it must have the same value wherever it occurs; meaning that once its value is set (positive/present or negative/absent), then it's fixed. When an alpha is read as ‘+’, all other alphas in the same rule are to be read as positive, vice versa for negative sign.

=== Example ===
An example is the phonological rule of nasalization in Malay:

- mãrah (meaning "ascend")
- mãkan (meaning "eat")
- kərəta (meaning "car")

Where the following rule is deduced: [−consonantal] → [α nasal] / [α nasal] ___.

=== Multiple variable rules: α, β ===
When multiple variables are needed, it is called implicit algebraic variables. An example is f(x, y) = 0, where one variable is in function with other set of variables.

== See also ==
- Alternation (linguistics)
- Sound change

== Bibliography ==
- Bale, Alan; Reiss, Charles (2018). Phonology: A formal introduction. MIT Press.
- Goldsmith, John A. (1995). "Phonological Theory". In John A. Goldsmith (ed.). The Handbook of Phonological Theory. Blackwell Handbooks in Linguistics. Blackwell Publishers.
- Hayes, Bruce (2009). Introductory Phonology. Blackwell Textbooks in Linguistics. Wiley-Blackwell. ISBN 978-1-4051-8411-3.
