= Alternation (linguistics) =

Alternate phonetic realization of a morpheme

In linguistics, an alternation is the phenomenon of a morpheme exhibiting variation in its phonological realization. Each of the various realizations is called an alternant. The variation may be conditioned by the phonological, morphological, and/or syntactic environment in which the morpheme finds itself.

Alternations provide linguists with data that allow them to determine the allophones and allomorphs of a language's phonemes and morphemes and to develop analyses determining the distribution of those allophones and allomorphs.

The term "sound change" refers to diachronic changes, which occur in a language's sound system. On the other hand, "alternation" refers to changes that happen synchronically (within the language of an individual speaker, depending on the neighbouring sounds) and do not change the language's underlying system.

== Phonologically conditioned alternation ==
An example of a phonologically conditioned alternation is the English plural marker commonly spelled s or es. This morpheme is pronounced /s/, /z/, or /ᵻz/, (Note: The vowel of the inflectional suffix -⟨es⟩ may belong to the phoneme of either /ɪ/ or /ə/ depending on dialect, and ⟨ᵻ⟩ is a shorthand for "either /ɪ/ or /ə/". This usage of the symbol is borrowed from the Oxford English Dictionary.) depending on the nature of the preceding sound.

1. If the preceding sound is a sibilant consonant (one of /s/, /z/, /ʃ/, /ʒ/), or an affricate (one of /tʃ/, /dʒ/), the plural marker takes the form /ᵻz/. Examples:
  - mass /ˈmæs/, plural masses /ˈmæsᵻz/
  - fez /ˈfɛz/, plural fezzes /ˈfɛzᵻz/
  - mesh /ˈmɛʃ/, plural meshes /ˈmɛʃᵻz/
  - mirage /mɪˈrɑːʒ/, plural mirages /mɪˈrɑːʒᵻz/
  - church /ˈtʃɜːrtʃ/, plural churches /ˈtʃɜːrtʃᵻz/
  - bridge /ˈbrɪdʒ/, plural bridges /ˈbrɪdʒᵻz/
2. Otherwise, if the preceding sound is voiceless, the plural marker takes the likewise voiceless form /s/. Examples:
  - mop /ˈmɒp/, plural mops /ˈmɒps/
  - mat /ˈmæt/, plural mats /ˈmæts/
  - pack /ˈpæk/, plural packs /ˈpæks/
  - cough /ˈkɒf/, plural coughs /ˈkɒfs/
  - myth /ˈmɪθ/, plural myths /ˈmɪθs/
3. Otherwise, the preceding sound is voiced, and the plural marker takes the likewise voiced form /z/.
  - dog /ˈdɒɡ/, plural dogs /ˈdɒɡz/
  - glove /ˈɡlʌv/, plural gloves /ˈɡlʌvz/
  - ram /ˈræm/, plural rams /ˈræmz/
  - doll /ˈdɒl/, plural dolls /ˈdɒlz/
  - toe /ˈtoʊ/, plural toes /ˈtoʊz/

== Alternation related to meaning ==
=== Morphologically conditioned alternation ===
French has an example of morphologically conditioned alternation. The feminine form of many adjectives ends in a consonant sound that is missing in the masculine form. In spelling, the feminine ends in a silent e, while the masculine ends in a silent consonant letter:

- masculine petit [pəti], feminine petite [pətit] 'small'
- masculine grand [ɡʁɑ̃], feminine grande [ɡʁɑ̃d] 'tall'
- masculine gros [ɡʁo], feminine grosse [ɡʁos] 'big'
- masculine joyeux [ʒwajø], feminine joyeuse [ʒwajøz] 'merry'
- masculine franc [fʁɑ̃], feminine franche [fʁɑ̃ʃ] 'sincere'
- masculine bon [bɔ̃], feminine bonne [bɔn] 'good'

=== Syntactically conditioned alternation ===
Syntactically conditioned alternations can be found in the Insular Celtic languages, where words undergo various initial consonant mutations depending on their syntactic position. For example, in Irish, an adjective undergoes lenition after a feminine singular noun:

- unmutated mór [mˠoːɾˠ] 'big', mutated in bean mhór [bʲan woːɾˠ] 'a big woman'

In Welsh, a noun undergoes soft mutation when it is the direct object of a finite verb:

- unmutated beic [bəik] "bike", mutated in Prynodd y ddynes feic. [ˈprənoð ə ˈðənɛs vəik] 'The woman bought a bike.'

== See also ==
- Phonological rule
- Sound change
- Apophony
- Sandhi
- Allophone
