= Louis Havet =

French Latinist and Hellenist (1849–1925)

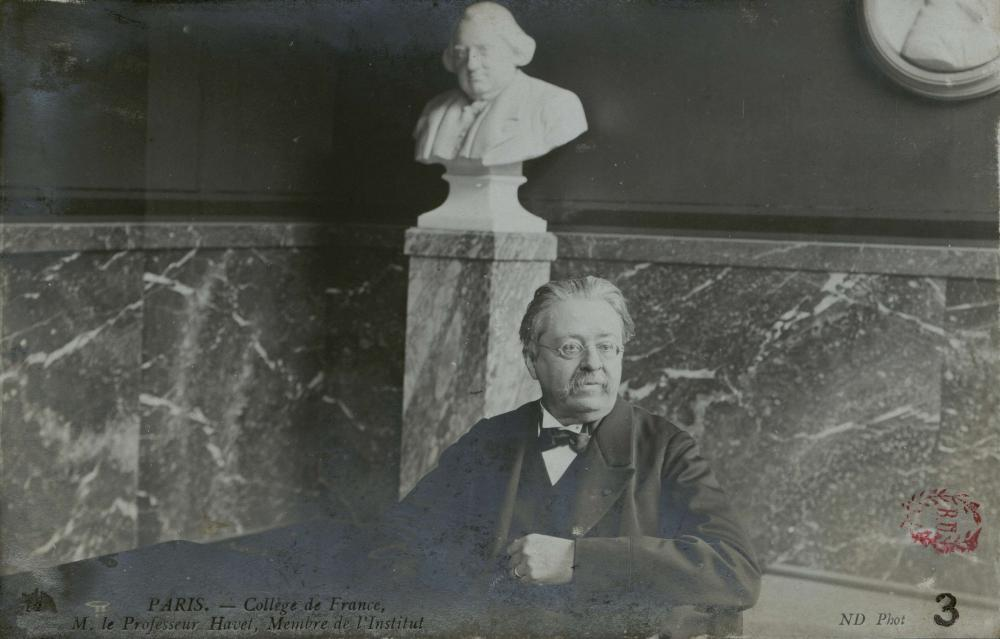
- Born: 6 January 1849; Paris, French Second Republic
- Died: 26 January 1925 (aged 76); Paris, French Third Republic
- Known for: Thurneysen–Havet's law
- Scientific career
- Fields: linguistics, classical languages
- Institutions: Collège de France

Pierre Antoine Louis Havet (French: [avɛ]; 6 January 1849 – 26 January 1925) was a French Latinist and Hellenist, an expert on classical Greek and Latin poetry. He was the son of Ernest Havet.

He was professor at Collège de France, where between 1885 and 1925 he was chairman of the department of Latin philology. Beginning in 1893, he was a member of the Académie des Inscriptions et Belles-Lettres. In 1917, he became the first vice-president of the Association Guillaume Budé.

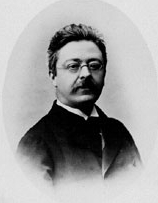
Havet sometime after 1900

He was a member of the central committee of the Human Rights League, which defended Alfred Dreyfus in the Dreyfus affair.

== Major works ==
- Manuel de critique verbale appliquée aux textes latins (1867)
- Cours élémentaire de métrique grecque et latine (1886)
- La Prose métrique de Symmaque et les origines métriques du Cursus (1892) Text online
- Amphitruo (Amphitryon, by Plautus) ed. L. Havet (1895) Text online
- Manuel de critique verbale appliquée aux textes latins (1911)
- Notes critiques sur le texte de Festus (1914) Text online
- Notes critiques sur l'Orator et sur Isée (1927) Text online
