= Jean Bottéro =

French assyriologist (1914–2007)

- Born: 30 August 1914; Vallauris, France
- Died: December 2007 (aged 93); Gif-sur-Yvette, France

Academic work
- Discipline: history
- Sub-discipline: Assyriology
- Institutions: École pratique des hautes études
- Notable works: Il était une fois la Mésopotamie

Jean Bottéro (30 August 1914 – 15 December 2007) was a French historian, assyriologist, Bible and ancient Near East scholar, and one of the world’s leading experts on Mesopotamia. He was a major Assyriologist, a renowned expert on the Ancient Near East and director of the Assyriology Chair at the École pratique des hautes études in Paris.

== Biography ==
He participated with other colleagues committed to the left (Elena Cassin, Maxime Rodinson, Maurice Godelier, Charles Malamoud, André-Georges Haudricourt, Jean-Paul Brisson, Jean Yoyotte) in a Marxist think tank organised by Jean-Pierre Vernant. This group took on an institutional form with the creation, in 1964, of the Centre des recherches comparées sur les sociétés anciennes, which later became the Centre Louis Gernet, focusing more on the study of ancient Greece.

Between 1965 and 1967, together with Elena Cassin and Jean Vercoutter, he was the editor of the three volumes of the Fischer Weltgeschichte (Fischer World History) devoted to the Ancient East.

== Works ==
- Collab. with Marie-Joseph Stève, Il était une fois la Mésopotamie, collection « Découvertes Gallimard » (nº 191), série Archéologie. Paris: Gallimard, 1993, reprint 2009. ISBN 9782070395705.
- Babylone : À l'aube de notre culture, collection « Découvertes Gallimard » (nº 230), série Histoire. Paris: Gallimard, 1994. ISBN 9782070532551.
- Ancestor of the West: Writing, Reasoning, and Religion in Mesopotamia, Elam, and Greece, Jean Bottéro, Clarisse Herrenschmidt, and Jean-Pierre Vernant, with foreword by François Zabbal, translated by Teresa Lavender Fagan. University of Chicago Press, 2000. ISBN 978-0226067155.
- The Oldest Cuisine in the World: Cooking in Mesopotamia, Jean Bottéro, translated by Teresa Lavender Fagan. U of Chicago Press, 2004. ISBN 978-0226067353 .
- Everyday Life in Ancient Mesopotamia, Jean Bottéro, André Finet, Bertrand Lafont, Georges Roux, translated by Antonia Nevill. JHU Press, 2001. ISBN 978-0801868641.
- Religion in Ancient Mesopotamia, Jean Bottéro, translated by Teresa Lavender Fagan. U of Chicago Press, 2001. ISBN 978-0226067179
- Birth of God: The Bible and the Historian, Jean Bottéro, translated by Kees W. Bolle. Penn State Press, 2010. ISBN 978-0271040301.
