= Maxime Rodinson =

French historian, sociologist and orientalist (1915–2004)

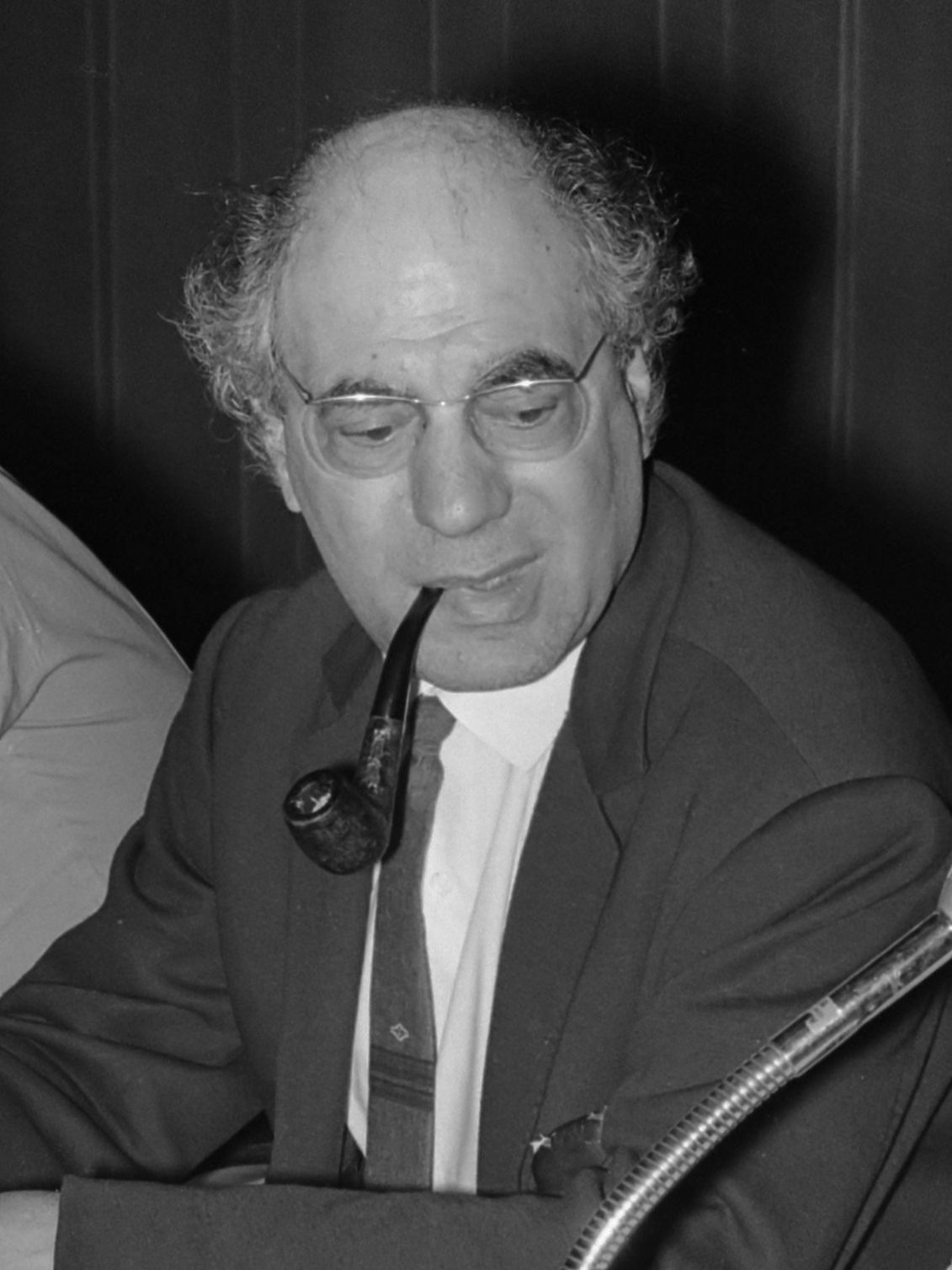
- Rodinson in 1970
- Born: 26 January 1915; Paris, France
- Died: 23 May 2004 (aged 89); Marseille, France
- Political party: PCF (1937–1958)
- Spouse: Geneviève Gendron

Academic work
- Discipline: History; oriental studies; sociology
- School or tradition: Marxism
- Institutions: École pratique des hautes études
- Main interests: Islam
- Notable works: Muhammad (1961); Islam and Capitalism (1966)

Maxime Rodinson (French: [ʁɔdɛ̃sɔ̃]; 26 January 1915 – 23 May 2004) was a French historian and sociologist. Ideologically a Marxist, Rodinson was a prominent authority in oriental studies. He was the son of a Russian-Belarusian clothing trader and his wife, who both were murdered in the Auschwitz concentration camp. After studying oriental languages, he became a professor of Ge'ez at the École pratique des hautes études. He was the author of a body of work, including the book Muhammad, a biography of the prophet of Islam.

Rodinson joined the French Communist Party in 1937 for "moral reasons" but was expelled in 1958 after criticizing it. He became well known in France when he expressed sharp criticism of Israel, particularly opposing the settlement policies of the Jewish state. Some credit him with coining the term Islamic fascism (le fascisme islamique) in 1979, which he used to describe the Iranian Revolution.

== Biography ==
=== Family ===
The parents of Maxime Rodinson, Maurice (Moshe) Rodinson, born in Vitebsk in 1864, and Anna Rodinson, née Gotlibovski in Suwałki in 1884, were Russian-Polish Jewish immigrants who were members of the French Communist Party. They arrived in France respectively in 1885 and 1902 as refugees from pogroms in the Russian Empire. His father was a clothing trader who set up a business making waterproof clothing in the Yiddish-speaking part of Paris, called the Pletzl, in the district of the Marais. They became port-of-call for other Russian exiles, most of them revolutionaries hostile to the Tsarist regime. His father tried to unionise and organize educational and other services for his working-class immigrant group. In 1892, he helped to establish a community library, containing hundreds of works in Yiddish, Russian, and French.

In 1920, the Rodinsons joined the Communist Party and as soon as France recognized the Russian SFSR, in 1924, they applied for Soviet citizenship. Rodinson grew up in a fervently Communist, non-religious and anti-Zionist family.

=== Early life and education ===
Rodinson was born in Paris on 26 January 1915. Neither he nor his sister learned Yiddish. The family was poor, so Rodinson became an errand boy at the age of 13 after obtaining a primary school certificate. But his learning thrived through borrowed books and obliging teachers who didn't demand payment, and Rodinson began to study oriental languages, at first on Saturday afternoons and in the evenings.

In 1932, thanks to a rule allowing persons without academic qualifications to take the competitive entrance examination, Rodinson gained entry to the Ecole des Langues Orientales and prepared for a career as a diplomat-interpreter. He studied Arabic but later, preparing a thesis in comparative Semitics, he also learned Hebrew, which surprised his family. In 1937, he entered the National Council of Research, became a full-time student of Islam, and joined the Communist Party.

=== Syria and Lebanon (1940–1947) ===
In 1940, after the beginning of the Second World War, Rodinson was appointed to the French Institute in Damascus. His subsequent stay in Lebanon and Syria allowed him to escape the persecution of Jews in occupied France and extend his knowledge of Islam. His parents were murdered in Auschwitz in 1943. Rodinson spent most of the next seven years in Lebanon, six as a civil servant in Beirut and six months teaching in Sidon at the Maqasid high school.

=== Professor of oriental languages and Marxist without a political party ===
In 1948, Rodinson became a librarian at the Bibliothèque Nationale in Paris, where he was put in charge of the Muslim section. In 1955, he was appointed director of studies at the École pratique des hautes études, becoming a professor of classical Ethiopian four years later. Rodinson left the Communist Party in 1958, following Nikita Khrushchev's revelations of Stalin's crimes amid accusations of using the association to further his career, but nonetheless remained a Marxist. According to Rodinson himself, the decision was based on his agnosticism, and he explained that being a party member was like following a religion and he wanted to renounce "the narrow subordination of efforts at lucidity to the exigencies of mobilization, even for just causes."

He became well known when he published Muhammad in 1961, a biography of the prophet's life written from a sociological point of view, a book which is still banned in parts of the Arab world. Five years later, he published Islam and Capitalism, a study of the economic decline of Muslim societies. He participated with other colleagues committed to the left (Elena Cassin, Maurice Godelier, André-Georges Haudricourt, Charles Malamoud, Jean-Paul Brisson, Jean Yoyotte, Jean Bottero) in a Marxist think tank organised by Jean-Pierre Vernant. This group took on an institutional form with the creation, in 1964, of the Centre des recherches comparées sur les sociétés anciennes, which later became the Centre Louis Gernet, focusing more on the study of ancient Greece. He was awarded the 1995 Prize by the Rationalist Organisation.

Rodinson died on 23 May 2004 in Marseille.

== Israeli–Palestinian conflict ==
=== Support for Palestinian self-determination ===
Rodinson took a public stance in favour of Palestinian self-determination during the Six-Day War. A few months before publishing his famous article, Rodinson took part in a meeting organized in the "Mutualité" in Paris for the Palestinian struggle. Published in June 1967 under the title "Israel, fait colonial" (Israel, a colonial fact) in Jean-Paul Sartre's journal, Les Temps Modernes, Rodinson's article made him known as an advocate of the Palestinian cause. He created the Groupe de Recherches et d'Actions pour la Palestine with his colleague Jacques Berque.

At that time, he observed that the Palestinian struggle was a cause embraced mainly by the antisemitic right and Maoist fringe of the left. He called on the Palestinians to take their case to liberal Europeans, warning them of the danger of a religious nature of the conflict which would tarnish the reputation of a just cause:

in the ardour of the ideological struggle against Zionism, those Arabs most influenced by a Muslim religious orientation would seize upon the old religious and popular prejudices against the Jews in general

=== Theoretical stance ===
His anti-Zionism was based on two main reproaches: pretending to impose on all people of Judaic descent all over the world an identity and a nationalist ideology, and judaizing territories at the cost of expulsion and domination of the Palestinians. Hence, in his book Israël and the Arabs in 1968, he considered the Palestinians as the single national fact in the Palestinian territories:

The Arabs of Palestine used to have the same rights over Palestinian territory as the French exercise in France and the English in England. These rights have been violated without any provocation on their part. There is no evading this simple fact.

Elsewhere, he emphasized that

my uncompromising condemnation of the errors and crimes committed under the aegis of the Zionist movement, in contradistinction to the apologies for these things by my opponents, has given me the right to criticize more or less analogous ideas and practices among the Arabs, who understandably are not interested in obviously biased discourses. For my part, I have been able to try to explain to Arab audiences, to Arab public opinion, that the behaviour of the Zionists, although surely meriting criticism, does belong to the gamut of human conduct. I have said and reiterated, for example before three commissions convoked by the Egyptian Popular Assembly in late 1969, that ... I deplored the historical error of the creation of the state of Israel on Arab land, but that a new nationality or ethnic group with a culture of its own now exists there, and not a religious community that could as well adopt the Arabic language and Arab culture, nor a heterogeneous collection of gangs of occupiers who could be sent back where they came from with the greatest of ease."

His approach to the Israeli–Palestinian conflict included a call for peaceful negotiations between Israeli Jews and Palestinians. Israel could not be regarded only as a colonial-settler state but a national fact too. Israeli Jews had collective rights that the Palestinians had to honour:

If there are two or more ethnic groups in the same country, and if the danger of the domination of one by the other is to be avoided, then both these groups must be represented as distinct communities at the political level, and each must be accorded the right to defend its interests and aspirations.

That is the reason why he disagreed with the Palestine Liberation Organization (PLO), warning them against the illusion based on the Algerian FLN guerilla warfare which had driven out French "colons". At the same time, he urged the Israelis to stop pretending to be part of Europe and accept being a part of the Middle East, then, Israelis have to learn to live with their neighbours, by reckoning the injustices made against the Palestinians and adopting a language of conciliation and compromise.

== Studying Islam from a Marxist and sociological point of view ==
Rodinson's work combined sociological and Marxist theories, which, he said, helped him to understand "that the world of Islam was subject to the same laws and tendencies as the rest of the human race." Hence, his first book was a study of Muhammad (Muhammad, 1960), setting the Prophet in his social context. This attempt was a rationalist study which tried to explain the economical and social origins of Islam. A later work was Islam and Capitalism (1966), the title echoing to Max Weber's famous thesis regarding the development of capitalism in Europe and the rise of Protestantism. Rodinson tried to rise above two prejudices: the first one widespread in Europe that Islam is a brake for the development of capitalism, and the second one, widespread among Muslims, that Islam was egalitarian. He emphasized social elements, seeing Islam as a neutral factor. Throughout all of his later works on Islam, Rodinson stressed the relation between the doctrines inspired by Muhammad and the economic and social structures of the Muslim world.

Rodinson also coined the term theologocentrism for the tendency to explain all empirical phenomena in the Muslim world with reference to Islam, while ignoring the role of "historical and social conditioning" in explaining events.

In his book Mohammed (1971), Rodinson writes:

I have no wish to deceive anyone ... I do not believe that the Koran is the book of Allah. If I did, I should be a Muslim. But the Koran is there, and since I, like many other non-Muslims, have interested myself in the study of it, I am naturally bound to express my views. For several centuries the explanation produced by Christians and rationalists has been that Muhammad was guilty of falsification, by deliberately attributing to Allah his own thoughts and instructions. We have seen that this theory is not tenable. The most likely one, as I have explained at length, is that Muhammad did really experience sensory phenomena translated into words and phrases and that he interpreted them as messages from the Supreme Being. He developed the habit of receiving these revelations in a particular way. His sincerity appears beyond a doubt, especially in Mecca when we see how Allah hustled, chastised and led him into steps that he was extremely unwilling to take.

== Works ==
This list refers to the English editions.

- The Arabs (1981) ISBN 0-226-72356-9 — original French publication: 1979
- Marxism and the Muslim world (1982) ISBN 0-85345-586-4, original French publication: 1972
- Israel and the Arabs (1982) ISBN 0-14-022445-9
- Marxist-Leninist Scientific Atheism and the Study of Religion and Atheism in the USSR (Religion and Reason) by James Thrower with introduction by Maxime Rodinson (1983) ISBN 90-279-3060-0
- Cult, Ghetto, and State: The Persistence of the Jewish Question (1984) ISBN 0-685-08870-7
- Israel: A Colonial-Settler State? (1988) ISBN 0-913460-22-2
- Europe and the Mystique of Islam (2002) ISBN 1-85043-106-X, translation of 'La Fascination de l'Islam,' 1980
- Muhammad (2002) ISBN 1-56584-752-0, original French publication: 1960
- Islam and Capitalism (1973) ISBN 0-292-73816-1, original French publication of 'Islam et le capitalisme' in 1966.

== See also ==
- Gilbert Achcar
- Islamic scholars
- Zionism as settler colonialism
- Sami Zubaida

Awards
Preceded by Lucio Colletti	Deutscher Memorial Prize; 1974	Succeeded by Marcel Liebman
