= Jean Yoyotte =

French egyptologist (1927–2009)

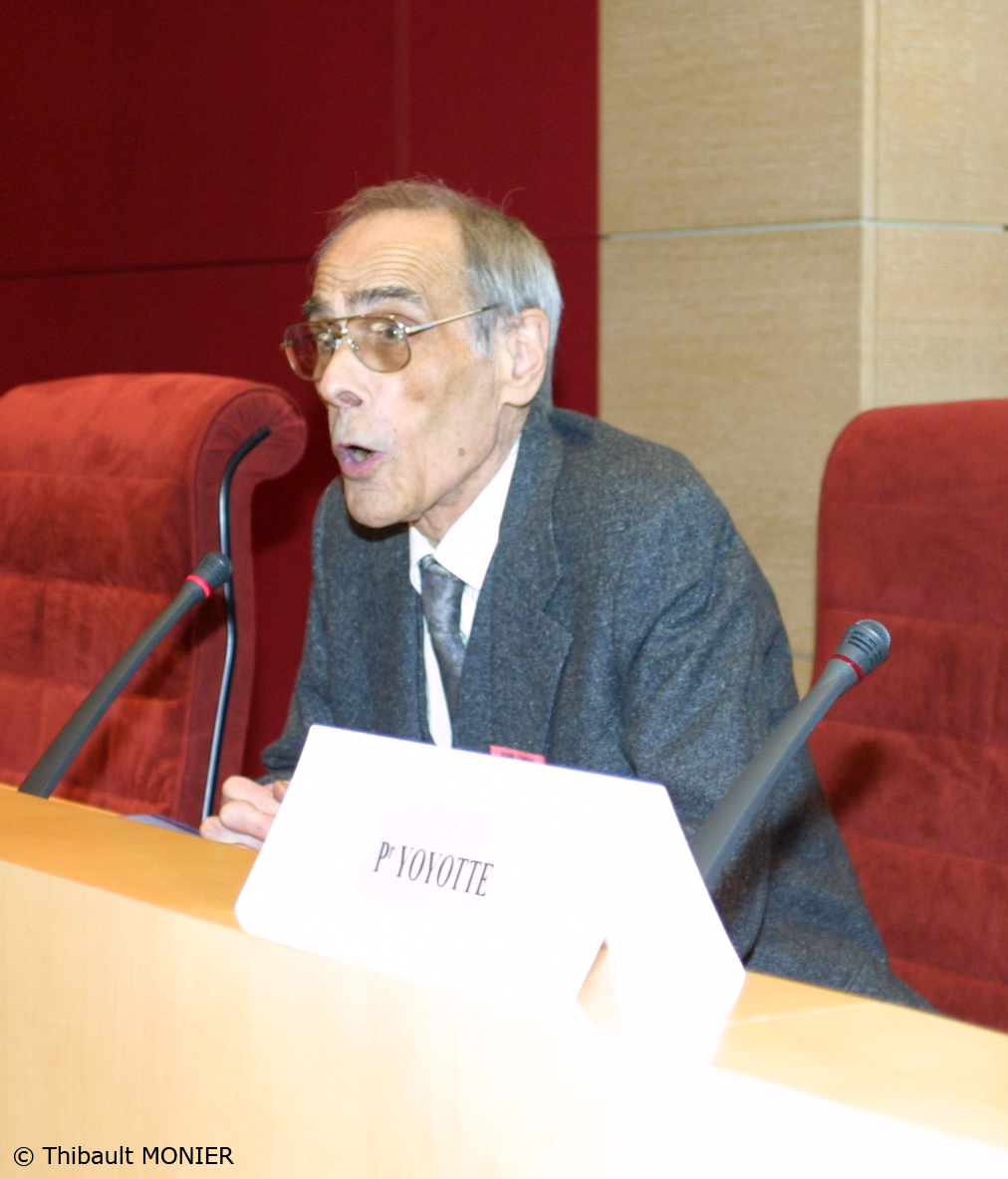
- Yoyotte in 2003
- Born: 4 August 1927; Lyon, France
- Died: 1 July 2009 (aged 81); Paris, France
- Occupation: Egyptologist

Jean Yoyotte (4 August 1927 – 1 July 2009) was a French Egyptologist, a professor of Egyptology at the Collège de France and director of research at the École pratique des hautes études (EPHE).

== Biography ==
Born in 1927 at Lyon, Yoyotte attended the Lycée Henri-IV where he befriended Serge Sauneron who later became director of the Institut Français d'Archéologie Orientale (IFAO). Later he attended a course at the École du Louvre under the supervision of Jacques Vandier, and later studied at the EPHE. Around 1949, he conducted research at the Centre national de la recherche scientifique, and in the interval 1952–56 he was in Cairo at the IFAO. In 1964 he became director of research for ancient Egyptian religion at the EPHE, where he was a student a few decades earlier.

He participated with other colleagues committed to the left (Elena Cassin, Maxime Rodinson, Maurice Godelier, Charles Malamoud, André-Georges Haudricourt, Jean-Paul Brisson, Jean Bottéro) in a Marxist think tank organised by Jean-Pierre Vernant. This group took on an institutional form with the creation, in 1964, of the Centre des recherches comparées sur les sociétés anciennes, which later became the Centre Louis Gernet, focusing more on the study of ancient Greece.

From 1965–85 he was director of the French excavations at Tanis in the eastern Nile Delta; he organized a major exhibition of the results of these excavations in 1987 at the Grand Palais in Paris. In 1992 he was appointed to the chair of Egyptology at the Collège de France, a position which he held until 2000.

== Death ==
Yoyotte died in Paris on 1 July 2009, aged 81.

== Significant works ==
- With Georges Posener and Serge Sauneron: Dictionnaire de la civilisation égyptienne (1959)
- With Serge Sauneron: La naissance du monde selon l'Égypte ancienne, In La Naissance du Monde, Paris (1959)
- Les trésors des pharaons, (1968)
- Tanis l'or des pharaons (1987)
- With Pascal Vernus: Dictionnaire des pharaons (1992) & Bestiaire des Pharaons (2001)
