= Transphonologization =

Concept in historical linguistics

In historical linguistics, transphonologisation (also known as rephonologisation or cheshirisation, see below) is a type of sound change whereby a phonemic contrast that used to involve a certain feature X evolves in such a way that the contrast is preserved, yet becomes associated with a different feature Y.

For example, a language contrasting two words */sat/ vs. */san/ may evolve historically so that final consonants are dropped, yet the modern language preserves the contrast through the nature of the vowel, as in a pair /sa/ vs. /sã/. Such a situation would be described by saying that a former contrast between oral and nasal consonants has been transphonologised into a contrast between oral and nasal vowels.

The term transphonologisation was coined by André-Georges Haudricourt. The concept was defined and amply illustrated by Hagège & Haudricourt; it has been mentioned by several followers of panchronic phonology, and beyond.

== Resulting in a new contrast on vowels ==
=== Umlaut ===
A common example of transphonologisation is umlaut.

Germanic

In many Germanic languages around 500–700 AD, a sound change fronted a back vowel when an /i/ or /j/ followed in the next syllable. Typically, the /i/ or /j/ was then lost, leading to a situation where a trace of the original /i/ or /j/ remains in the fronted quality of the preceding vowel. Alternatively, a distinction formerly expressed through the presence or absence of an /i/ or /j/ suffix was then re-expressed as a distinction between a front or back vowel.

As a specific instance of this, in prehistoric Old English, a certain class of nouns was marked by an /i/ suffix in the (nominative) plural, but had no suffix in the (nominative) singular. A word like /muːs/ "mouse", for example, had a plural /muːsi/ "mice". After umlaut, the plural became pronounced [myːsi], where the long back vowel /uː/ was fronted, producing a new subphonemic front-rounded vowel [yː], which serves as a secondary indicator of plurality. Subsequent loss of final /i/, however, made /yː/ a phoneme and the primary indicator of plurality, leading to a distinction between /muːs/ "mouse" and /myːs/ "mice". In this case, the lost sound /i/ left a trace in the presence of /yː/; or equivalently, the distinction between singular and plural, formerly expressed through a suffix /i/, has been re-expressed using a different feature, namely the front–back distinction of the main vowel. This distinction survives in the modern forms "mouse" /maʊs/ and "mice" /maɪs/, although the specifics have been modified by the Great Vowel Shift.

Outside Germanic

Similar phenomena have been described in languages outside Germanic.

- Seventeen Austronesian languages of northern Vanuatu have gone through a process whereby former *CVCV disyllables lost their final vowel, yet preserved their contrast through the creation of new vowels: e.g. Proto-Oceanic *paRi "stingray" and *paRu "hibiscus" transphonologised to /βɛr/ and /βɔr/ in Mwesen. This resulted in the expansion of vowel inventories in the region, from an original five-vowel system (*a *e *i *o *u) to inventories ranging from 7 to 16 vowels (depending on the language).

=== Nasalisation of vowels ===
- In French, a final /n/ sound disappeared, but left its trace in the nasalisation of the preceding vowel, as in vin blanc [vɛ̃ blɑ̃], from historical [vin blaŋk].
- In many languages (Sino-Tibetan, Austroasiatic, Oceanic, Celtic...), a vowel was nasalised by the nasal consonant preceding it: this "historical transfer of nasality between consonantal onset and vowel" is a case of transphonologization.

=== Compensatory lengthening ===
- In American English, the words rider and writer are pronounced with a [ɾ] instead of [t] and [d] as a result of flapping. The distinction between the two words can, however, be preserved by (or transferred to) the length of the vowel (or in this case, diphthong), as vowels are pronounced longer before voiced consonants than before voiceless consonants. Also, the quality of the vowels may be affected.

Before disappearing, a sound may trigger or prevent some phonetic change in its vicinity that would not otherwise have occurred, and which may remain long afterward. For example:

- In the English word night, the /x/ sound (spelled gh) disappeared, but before, or perhaps as it did so (see "compensatory lengthening"), it lengthened the vowel ⟨i⟩, so that the word is pronounced /ˈnaɪt/ "nite" rather than the /ˈnɪt/ "nit" that would otherwise be expected for a closed syllable.
- in Hejazi Arabic's direct object pronoun, the /h/ ـُه sound at the end of words has disappeared, so that the contrast in the Classical Arabic قالوه /qaː.luːh/ (they said it) and قالوا /qaː.luː/ (they said) became a contrast only between the vowels as قالوه /ɡaː.loː/ (they said it) and قالوا /ɡaː.lu/ (they said).

=== Tone languages ===
- The existence of contrastive tone in modern languages often originates in transphonologization of earlier contrasts between consonants: e.g. a former contrast of consonant voicing (*/pa/ vs. */ba/) transphonologizes to a tonal contrast (*/pa ˥/ vs. */pa ˩/)
- The tone split of Chinese, where the voiced consonants present in Middle Chinese lowered the tone of a syllable and subsequently lost their voicing in many varieties.
- Floating tones are generally the remains of entire disappeared syllables.

== Resulting in a new contrast on consonants ==
- Consonant mutation in Celtic languages (a lost vowel triggered initial consonant lenition, and a lost nasal triggered nasalization).
- In Sanskrit, the sequence *-Vžd- became retroflexed and lengthened to -V̄ḍ-, e.g. Proto-Indo-European *nizdós ("nest") → Proto-Indo-Iranian *niždás → Sanskrit nīḍáḥ.
- In Makassarese and Berau, Proto-Malayo-Polynesian schwa phoneme *ə geminates the following consonant but merges to a (Makassarese *bəli → *bəlli → balli "to buy, price", compare Indonesian beli).

== Other examples ==
- The prevention of sound change by a lost consonant in Lahu;
- In Estonian and some other Uralic languages, when case endings are elided, the changed root indicates the presence of the case, see consonant gradation.

== Other names ==
Rephonologisation was a term used by Roman Jakobson (1931 [1972]) to refer to essentially the same process but failed to catch on because of its ambiguity. In a 1994 paper, Norman (1994) used it again in the context of a proposed Old Chinese sound change that transferred a distinction formerly expressed through putative pharyngealization of the initial consonant of a syllable to one expressed through presence or absence of a palatal glide /j/ before the main vowel of the syllable. However, rephonologization is occasionally used with another meaning, referring to changes such as the Germanic sound shift or the Slavic change from /ɡ/ to /ɦ/, where the phonological relationships among sounds change but the number of phonemes stays the same. That can be viewed as a special case of the broader process being described here.

James Matisoff (1991:443) coined cheshirisation as a synonym for transphonologisation. The term jokingly refers to the Cheshire Cat, a character in the book Alice in Wonderland, who "vanished quite slowly, beginning with the end of the tail, and ending with the grin, which remained some time after the rest of it had gone". Cheshirisation has been used by some other authors (e.g. John McWhorter in McWhorter 2005, and Hilary Chappell in Chappell 2006).
