= Panchronic phonology =

Approach to historical phonology

Panchronic phonology is an approach to historical phonology. Its aim is to formulate generalizations about sound changes that are independent of any particular language or language group.

== Etymology ==
The term panchronic as applied to linguistics goes back at least to Ferdinand de Saussure, who uses it to refer to the most general principles, independently of concrete facts. The panchronic program in phonology, however, is associated with the work of André-Georges Haudricourt, especially his seminal articles of 1940 and 1973, and the preliminary synthesis published with Claude Hagège in 1978.

== Main tenets ==
Beyond case studies, one of the goals of comparative linguistics is to assemble data that lead to an inventory of the common types of sound change and to an improved understanding of the conditions under which they occur. Panchronic phonology aims to achieve this: it attempts to formulate generalizations about sound change that are independent of any particular language or language group. Haudricourt (1973) labels such an approach panchronic phonology. Panchronic laws are obtained by induction from a typological survey of precise diachronic events whose analysis brings out their common conditions of appearance. In turn, they can be used to shed light on individual historical situations.

Panchronic phonology is a research program, not a full-fledged, fully realized model of language change. It has been pointed out that the book La Phonologie panchronique, co-authored by Claude Hagège and Haudricourt, only scratches the surface of the many topics that it aims to treat.

In practice, the panchronic program requires the compilation of as many attested cases of sound changes as possible, with detailed information on the state of the linguistic system where it took place. The study of sound changes in progress is another important source of information about the mechanisms of sound change; particular attention is paid to unstable states, and to the phonetic analysis of synchronic variation. One of the aims of the panchronic approach in phonology is to link up findings about synchronic variation and findings about long-term historical change.

== Examples of panchronic regularities ==
- Haudricourt's programmatic 1940 article proposes the following example: there is a potential for the change from word-initial /st-/ to V(owel)+/st-/ when the following four conditions are met: (i) initial /st-/ is not significantly more frequent than V+/st-/; (ii) V+/st/ is allowed in word-final position; (iii) there is no word-initial stress; (iv) if the word where the change is to occur has N syllables, words with N+1 syllables must be allowed in the language.
- Haudricourt 1965 and Ferlus 1979 offer a second example: the modeling of the transphonologization of the voicing opposition among initial consonants. After evolving into an opposition between phonation types on the following vowel (breathy voice vs. modal voice), this opposition becomes tonal if the language already had tones: this creates a split in the tone system. Otherwise it becomes a vowel quality opposition, creating a two-way split in the vowel system. This model is verified in numerous East and Southeast Asian languages. The broadest formulation of this model is proposed by Ferlus (2009).

== Functional phonology ==
The panchronic program in phonology is a development from structural approaches to diachrony. Structural approaches to diachrony study the way in which phonological systems respond to the causes of change. A major source of change is the constant competition between the tendency towards phonological integration and the tendency towards phonetic simplicity. Phonological economy tends to fill structural gaps in phonological systems, and phonetic economy tends to create phonological gaps. Out of the pool of potential changes, the actual direction of evolution observed in a given language depends in part on the state of its phonological system, e.g. – again taking nasality as an example – which nasal phonemes it possesses (among consonants and vowels), which phonotactic constraints they are subject to, and what functional load they have in the system.

André Martinet expressed a skeptical view on the possibility of establishing panchronic laws of evolution, considering that the factors at play in linguistic change are of such complexity that no amount of detail can ever be sufficient to arrive at truly panchronic generalizations. He nonetheless considers the search for panchronic generalizations useful as a research tool: "Contrary to some other functionalists, I am not tempted to posit panchronic laws of phonological evolution. But looking for general laws may lead to what I would call the positing of useful hypotheses." Martinet takes the example of the following generalization, which he rephrases from Haudricourt's findings: "The articulation of a phoneme is only apt to get weaker when and if it stands in opposition to another phoneme sharing the same features, but distinct from it on account of a more energetic or a more complex articulation." Martinet concludes: "I still would prefer calling this a working hypothesis rather than a panchronic law, because I am convinced we shall one day come across a language where the weakening of consonants will be found to result from some unforeseen complex of factors." (ibid.)

== Other classical approaches to historical phonology ==
While the term panchronic is not widely used today, the aim to formulate generalizations about sound change that are independent of any particular language or language group is common to many historical linguists. William Labov's generalization that "In chain shifts, peripheral vowels become more open and nonperipheral vowels become less open" (1994: 601) can be considered as a panchronic statement. Several of the generalizations about nasal states and nasal processes proposed by Larry Hyman likewise aim to explain synchronic states in terms of the processes that lead up to them, and to arrive at general laws of sound change.

== Evolutionary phonology ==
The program of panchronic phonology is very close to that of evolutionary phonology, although with some interesting differences. Evolutionary phonology (as proposed by Juliette Blevins), building on work by John Ohala, considers phonetic variation as the primary source of phonological change. This emphasis on the phonetic bases of change encourages a continuous dialogue between experimental phonetics and historical phonology. Even if every scholars agree that there exist competing phonetic tendencies, according to Labov (1994: 601) they do not have explanatory or predictive power when it comes to individual cases. In panchronic phonology, not all sound changes are straightforwardly related to phonetic tendencies, and hypothesized universals of language change based on phonetic properties are considered to seldom stand close scrutiny. According to some authors, the existence of a pool of phonetic variation is only part of the thoroughly complex story of diachronic sound change.

== Sources ==
(in French)

- Hagège, Claude; Haudricourt, André-Georges (1978). La Phonologie Panchronique. Paris: Presses Universitaires de France.
- Haudricourt, André-Georges (1940). "Méthode pour Obtenir des Lois Concrètes en Linguistique Générale". Bulletin de la Société de Linguistique de Paris. 41 (1): 70–74.
- Haudricourt, André-Georges (1973). "La Linguistique Panchronique Nécessaire à la Linguistique Comparée, Science Auxiliaire de la Diachronie Sociologique et Ethnographique". Ethnies. 3: 23–26. doi:10.3406/ethni.1973.874.
- Mazaudon, Martine; Michailovsky, Boyd (2007), "La Phonologie Panchronique Aujourd'hui: Quelques Repères", in Fernandez-Vest, Jocelyne (ed.), Combats Pour Les Langues Du Monde: Hommage à Claude Hagège, Paris: L'Harmattan, pp. 351–362.
- Rivierre, Jean-Claude. 2011. "André-Georges Haudricourt Et La Phonologie : La Phonologie Panchronique En Perspective." Le Portique 27.
- Walter, Henriette. 1980. "A Propos de 'La Phonologie Panchronique'." La Linguistique 16 (2): 141–144.

(in English)

- Ferlus, Michel (2009). "What Were the Four Divisions of Middle Chinese?" (PDF). Diachronica. 26 (2): 184–213. doi:10.1075/dia.26.2.02fer. S2CID 170903626. Available from the HAL-SHS archive.
- François, Alexandre (2005). "Unraveling the history of the vowels of seventeen northern Vanuatu languages". Oceanic Linguistics. 44 (2): 443–504. doi:10.1353/ol.2005.0034. S2CID 131668754.
- Jacques, Guillaume (2011). "A panchronic study of aspirated fricatives, with new evidence from Pumi". Lingua. 121 (9): 1518–1538. doi:10.1016/j.lingua.2011.04.003. S2CID 56166344.
- Jacques, Guillaume 2013. "The sound change *s>n in Arapaho", Folia Linguistica Historica 34:43-57
- Martinet, André (1996). The Internal Conditioning of Phonological Systems. Thiruvananthapuram (India): International School of Dravidian Linguistics.
- Michaud, Alexis; Jacques, Guillaume; Rankin, Robert L. (2012). "Historical Transfer of Nasality Between Consonantal Onset and Vowel: From C to V or from V to C?". Diachronica. 29 (2): 201–230. doi:10.1075/dia.29.2.04mic. S2CID 53057252.
- Michaud, Alexis (2012), "Monosyllabicization: Patterns of Evolution in Asian Languages", in Nicole Nau; Thomas Stolz; Cornelia Stroh (eds.), Monosyllables: From Phonology to Typology, Berlin: Akademie Verlag, pp. 115–130.
