= Elena Cassin =

Italian oriental scholar (1909–2011)

- Born: 1909; Cuneo, Italy
- Died: June 2011 (aged 101–102); Paris, France
- Education: Sapienza University of Rome
- Scientific career
- Fields: Assyriology
- Workplaces: French National Centre for Scientific Research

Elena Cassin (1909 - June 2011) was an Italian-born French Assyriologist.

== Biography ==
Elena Cassin, daughter of the banker and politician Marco Cassin, studied the history of religions at the University of Rome and obtained her doctorate in 1933. She then went to Paris and attended Charles Fossey's course on ancient Babylon and Marcel Mauss' course on sociology. There she met her future husband, Jacques Vernant, brother of Jean-Pierre Vernant. She and the Vernant brothers participated in the French Resistance in the south of France. After the war Elena Cassin joined the French National Centre for Scientific Research as a specialist of Assyriology and of History of the Religions of the Ancient Near East.

She worked mainly on the legal and economic history of ancient Mesopotamia. Between 1965 and 1967, together with Jean Bottéro and Jean Vercoutter, she was the editor of the three volumes of the Fischer Weltgeschichte (Fischer World History named after publishing house S. Fischer Verlag) devoted to the Ancient East. She herself dealt with Mesopotamia in the second half of the second millennium and thus with the Mitanni and Nuzi and she also translated Sumerian into French.

She participated with other colleagues committed to the left (Maxime Rodinson, Maurice Godelier, André-Georges Haudricourt, Charles Malamoud, Jean-Paul Brisson, Jean Yoyotte, Jean Bottero) in a Marxist think tank organised by Jean-Pierre Vernant. This group took on an institutional form with the creation, in 1964, of the Centre des recherches comparées sur les sociétés anciennes, which later became the Centre Louis Gernet, focusing more on the study of ancient Greece.

Elena Cassin died at the age of 101.

== Works ==
- L’adoption à Nuzi, Paris, Adrien Maisonneuve, 1938.
- Cassin, Elena (1952). "Symboles de cession immobilière dans l'ancien droit mésopotamien". L'Année sociologique (1940/1948-). 6: 107–161. ISSN 0066-2399. JSTOR 27885025..
- Cassin, Elena (1960). "Le sceau : un fait de civilisation dans la Mésopotamie ancienne". Annales. Histoire, Sciences Sociales. 15 (4): 742–751. doi:10.3406/ahess.1960.421648. S2CID 161099948..
- La splendeur divine. Introduction à l'étude de la mentalité mésopotamienne, Paris, 1968.
- Cassin, Elena (1981). "Le roi et le lion". Revue de l'histoire des religions. 198 (4): 355–401. doi:10.3406/rhr.1981.4828.
- Cassin, Elena (1995). San Nicandro. Un paese del Gargano si converte all'ebraismo (in Italian). Corbaccio. ISBN 978-88-7972-086-1.
