= Centre de recherche et de documentation sur l'Océanie =

French research center

The Centre de Recherche et de Documentation sur l'Océanie, also known as CREDO (Center for Research and Documentation on Oceania) is a cross-disciplinary research laboratory in social and cultural anthropology, history and archaeology including researchers and lecturers from three institutions: the CNRS (National Center for Scientific Research), the EHESS (School for Advanced Studies in Social Sciences) and the University of Provence. Its main focus of research and teaching are the past and contemporary societies of the Pacific, Australia included.

== History ==
The CREDO was created in 1995 as an UMR (Unité Mixe de Recherche) of the CNRS and the EHESS in Marseilles, France. The principal founders of the CREDO are Pierre Lemonnier and Serge Tcherkézoff, with Maurice Godelier. From the very first year of its creation, its members wanted to be associated to the University of Provence in order to teach and supervise students from both major institutions in the South of France in the Humanities and Social Sciences.

In early March 1999, the CREDO left its original location in the Vieille Charité, hosted by the EHESS, and moved to the Saint-Charles Campus at the university of provence. Next to IRSEA (Laboratory on South-East Asia), and a new centre for documentation (MAP), the CREDO is now one of the three constituents of the Maison Asie Pacifique.

Previous directors of the centre were Maurice Godelier and Serge Tcherkézoff. The current director is Laurent Dousset.

== Research activities ==
The CREDO is engaged in a great number of research activities that are currently divided into 6 general themes:

- Theme 1 : Configuration and dynamics of identity: historical and contemporaneous processes of national constructions, regionalization and globalization.
- Theme 2 : Knowledge of the past: A critical historiography of the Pacific
- Theme 3 : The person: Gender and kinship, sexuation, socialization and individuation.
- Theme 4 : Ritual logics: symbolic, relational and cognitive approaches
- Theme 5 : Anthropology of knowledge: material culture, aesthetic manifestations and biodiversity
- Theme 6 : Visual anthropology, hypermedia and information systems

== Center for Documentation ==
The CREDO hosts its own center for documentation specialized in pacific publications and archival material. Currently, the center has more than 8000 books, and is subscribed to 23 scientific journals. It also owns a certain number of theses, offprints, various collections etc. The online catalog of the collection is accessible from the CREDO webpage

== Particular projects ==
The CREDO is engaged in research and documentary projects, including:

- ODSAS (Online Digital Sources and Annotation System), with the CNRS.
- AustKin (Tracing changes in the family structure of Aboriginal Australian Societies), with the Australian National University.
- Pacific Encounters (first contact history in the Pacific), with the University of Auckland and the Australian National University.

== Recent publications by the CREDO ==
- BONNEMÈRE, P. (en collaboration avec I. Théry) 2008 (ed). Ce que le genre fait aux personnes. Paris: Editions de l'EHESS (Collection Enquête).
- BONNEMERE, P. 2008 "Du corps au lien. L’implication des mères dans les initiations masculines des Ankave-Anga", in I. Théry et P. Bonnemère (eds), Ce que le genre fait aux personnes. Paris: Editions de l'EHESS (Collection Enquête): pp. 75–90.
- BONNEMÈRE, P. et LEMONNIER, P. 2007. Les tambours de l’oubli. La vie ordinaire et cérémonielle d’un peuple forestier de Papouasie/ Drumming to Forget: Ordinary Life and Ceremonies among a Papua New Guinea Group of Forest-Dwellers. Papeete : Au vent des îles/Musée du Quai Branly (coll. “Culture Pacifique”, 2007). [ouvrage bilingue français/anglais].
- BRUTTI, L. 2007. "From fertility rituals to mining companies: eco-cultural issues and land rights in Oksapmin (PNG)", Journal de la Société des Océanistes 125: 249–255.
- BRUTTI, L. 2007. Les Papous. Une diversité singulière. Paris: Gallimard
- COUPAYE, L. 2007. "Beyond Mediation : The Long Yams of Papua New Guinea", in Global and Local Art Histories, dirigé par Celina Jeffrey & Gregory Minissale. Cambridge : Cambridge Scholar Press : 205–220.
- COUPAYE, L. 2007. "Des Portraits Abelam", in Arts & Cultures 2007 : 258–275.
- COUPAYE, L. et A.-S. Rolland. 2007. "Sculpture des Abelam de Papouasie-Nouvelle-Guinée", in La Revue du Louvre, 74–77.
- DI PIAZZA A, PEARTHREE E & SAND C. (eds.) 2008. "At the heart of ancient societies." French contributions to Pacific Archaeology. Les Cahiers de l’Archeologie en Nouvelle-Calédonie 18, Nouméa.
- DI PIAZZA A. & PEARTHREE E. (eds.) 2008. Canoes of the Grand Ocean. BAR Archaeopress, Oxford.
- DI PIAZZA, A. et PEARTHREE, E. 2007 - A New Reading of Tupaia's Chart. The Journal of the Polynesian Society 116(3): 321–340.
- DI PIAZZA, A. et PEARTHREE, E. 2007 - Sailing Virtual canoes across Oceania. Revisiting island accessibility. Journal of Archaeological Science 34(8): 1219–1225.
- DI PIAZZA, A., KEMPF, W. et PEARTHREE, E. 2007 - Mapping Oceania past and present: movements, geographies, identities. Journal de la Société des Océanistes 125 (2): 209–212.
- DOUAIRE-MARSAUDON F. 2008. "Avant-propos", in F. Douaire-Marsaudon, A. Guillemin et C. Zheng, Missionnaires chrétiens, Asie et Pacifique, XIXè-XXè, Paris, Editions Autrement (coll. Mémoires/Histoire).
- DOUAIRE-MARSAUDON, F. (avec A. Guillemin et C. Zheng [éds]), 2008. Missionnaires chrétiens, Asie et Pacifique, XIXè-XXè. Paris: Editions Autrement (coll. Mémoires/Histoire)
- DOUAIRE-MARSAUDON, F. (ed.), 2008. Grands-mères, grands-pères. La grand-parentalité en Asie et dans le Pacifique : figures, pratiques, parcours. Aix-Marseille: Publications de l’Université de Provence.
- DOUAIRE-MARSAUDON, F. 2007. "Inventing Tradition: Building Links to the Past and Rooting them in History", in Michael Hsiao The Frontiers of Southeast Asia and Pacific Studies. Taipei: Center for Asia-Pacific Area Studies, Academia Sinica, pp. 199–209.
- DOUAIRE-MARSAUDON, F. 2007. "La Polynésie"; "Gauguin aux îles"; "Wallis et Futuna" in J.P Rioux (ed), Dictionnaire de la France coloniale, Paris : Flammarion, resp. p. 377-84, p. 385-87, p. 403-07, 2007.
- DOUAIRE-MARSAUDON, F. 2008. "Désir d’écrire. Le rôle de l’écriture dans la christianisation à Tonga (Polynésie)", in F. Douaire-Marsaudon, A. Guillemin et C. Zheng, Missionnaires chrétiens, Asie et Pacifique, XIXè-XXè, Paris, Editions Autrement (coll. Mémoires/Histoire).
- DOUAIRE-MARSAUDON, F. 2008. "Les missionnaires dans leurs œuvres. Instruire, soigner, bâtir", en coll. avec A. Guillemin et C. Zheng, in F. Douaire-Marsaudon, A. Guillemin et C. Zheng, Missionnaires chrétiens, Asie et Pacifique, XIXè-XXè, Paris, Editions Autrement (coll. Mémoires/Histoire).
- DOUAIRE-MARSAUDON, F. 2008. "Introduction", in F. Douaire-Marsaudon (ed.), Grands-mères, grands-pères. La grand-parentalité en Asie et dans le Pacifique: figures, pratiques, parcours. Aix-Marseille, Publications de l’Université de Provence, pp. 7–15.
- DOUAIRE-MARSAUDON, F. 2008. "Sur le chemin des ancêtres. La grandparentalité à Tonga (Polynésie)", in F. Douaire-Marsaudon (ed.), Grands-mères, grands-pères. La grand-parentalité en Asie et dans le Pacifique: figures, pratiques, parcours. Aix-Marseille, Publications de l’Université de Provence, pp. 92–103.
- DOUSSET L. & GLASKIN K. 2007. "Western Desert and Native Title: How models become myths", Anthropological Forum, 17(2): 127–148.
- DOUSSET L. 2007. "‘There never has been such a thing as a kin-based society’: A review article", Anthropological Forum, 17(1): 61-69.
- GODELIER M. 2008. "Au coeur des rapports sociaux : l'imaginaire dont les archéologues ne perçoivent que les restes symboliques". Archéopages, Hors Série, "Construction de l'archéologie", 2008, pp. 81–83
- GODELIER M. 2008. "L'anthropologie, par Maurice Godelier" (dimanche 2 mars 2008). Dans : Qui dites-vous que je suis ? Conférence de Carême de Paris 2008. Présentation par Cardinal andré Vingt-Trois. Paris, Editions Parole et Silence, 2008, pp 75–86.
- GODELIER M. 2008. "Maurice Godelier" Dans : Comment je suis devenu Ethnologue. Sous la direction de anne Dhoquois. Editions Le Cavalier Bleu, 2008, pp. 111–131
- GODELIER M. 2008. "Préface" à La Sexualité en France. Pratiques, Genre et Santé. Sous la dir. de Nathalie Bajos et Michel Bozon. Paris, La Découverte, 2008, pp 9–16.
- GODELIER M. 2008. "Death of a few celebrated truths and others that are worth restoring" (Inaugural Raymond Firth Lecture), Journal de la Société des Océanistes, 125(2): 181-192
- GODELIER, M. 2007. Au fondement des sociétés humaines: Ce que nous ap. prend l'anthropologie. Paris: Albin Michel, Bibliothèque Idées.
- GODELIER, M. 2008. In and out of the Western Tradition, Charlottesville, Virginia University Press.
- GODELIER, M. 2008. Russian translation of l'énigme du don.
- HONTHEIM A. de 2007. "Jungle to Church: Missionaries and the military co-operate in converting the Asmat to Christianity". Inside Indonesia 89 [Numéro spécial avril-juin : Freedom of religion]: 14–15.
- HONTHEIM A. de 2007. "La croix dans l’agenda : tentatives de domestication du temps asmat". In Corps, performance, religion. Études anthropologiques offertes à Philippe Jespers, Joël Noret et Pierre Petit (dir.), 309–327. Paris: Publibook.
- LEMONNIER P. (avec E. Venbrux) (ed.) 2007. Hertz revisité (1907–2007). Objets et changements dans les rituels funéraires. Dossier du Journal de la Société des Océanistes 124 (1) : 3–103.
- LEMONNIER P. 2007. "La mobilisation des mythes, de l’histoire et des corps d’ancêtres dans la construction progressive des identités masculines anga (Papouasie Nouvelle-Guinée)", Les Nouvelles de l’Archéologie, janvier 2007.
- LEMONNIER P. 2007. "Objets d’ambiguïté. Funérailles ankave (Papouasie Nouvelle-Guinée)", Journal de la Société des Océanistes 124 (1) : 33–43.
- PAUWELS, S. 2007. "Boat Symbolism, Ritual, and its Political Organization in Eastern Indonesia". The Frontiers of Southeast Asia and Pacific Studies, 2006 (Center for Asia-Pacific Area Studies, Academia Sinica, Taiwan).
- PAUWELS, S. 2007. "Un trophée fait fille ou lorsque l’étranger n’existe pas". La relation ethnographique, parcours ethnologiques, Ateliers du Lesc, n°33 (revues.org).
- PAUWELS, S. 2008. "Au nom (de) la renommée", in Grand-mère, grand-père, liens, figures et pratiques de la grand-parentalité dans les sociétés d’Asie et du Pacifique, ed. F. Douaire- Marsaudon. Marseille: Publications de l’Université de Provence, pp. 58–65.
- PAUWELS, S. 2008. Un voilier prédateur. Renommée et fertilité dans l'île indonésienne de Selaru. Paris: Les Indes Savantes.
- REVOLON, S. 2007a "Sur les traces des objets woriwori, “à vendre“. Les formes contemporaines du commerce d’objets sculptés chez les Owa d’Aorigi (Est des îles Salomon)". Pacifique sud : à l’épreuve du capitalisme, Cahiers du Pacifique Sud Contemporain n°4 : 86-111
- REVOLON, S. 2007b "“Les esprits aiment ce qui est beau“. Formes, sens et efficacité rituelle des sculptures owa (Est des îles Salomon)". Annales de la Fondation Fyssen 21 : 63-75
- REVOLON, S. 2007c "The dead are looking at us. Place and role of the apira ni farunga (“ceremonial bowls“) in post-funeral wakes in Aorigi (Eastern Solomon Islands)". Hertz revisité (1907-2007) Journal de la Société des Océanistes 124 (1) : 59-67
- TABANI, M. 2008. Une priogue pour le Paradis: Le culte John Frum à Tanna (Vanuatu). Paris : Editions de la Maison des Sciences de l’Homme. 255p.
- TCHERKEZOFF, S. 2009 (with M. Jolly & D. Tryon eds) Oceanic Encounters: Exchange, Desire, Violence. Canberra: ANU E-Press.
- TCHERKÉZOFF, S. 2008. Polynésie/Mélanésie: l'invention française des "races" et des régions de l'Océanie. Papeete: Au Vent des Iles.
- TCHERKÉZOFF, S. 2008 "Hierarchy is not inequality, in Polynesia for instance", in Persistence and Transformation in Social Formations, Knut Rio and Olaf H. Smedal (eds.), Oxford, Berghahn, p. 299-329.
- TCHERKÉZOFF, S. 2007 "Editorial" et "Introduction", in Livre Blanc de la Recherche en Nouvelle-Calédonie. Nouméa: Gouvernement de la Nouvelle-Calédonie et IRD.
- TCHERKÉZOFF, S. 2007 "Le Maori et la vahiné", Sciences Humaines, 186 (octobre): 31.
- VAN DER GRIJP P. 2007. "Precious Objects with a Natural Touch: Endangered Species and the Predilection for the Exotic", in H.-H. M. Hsiao (ed.): The Frontiers of Southeast-Asia and Pacific Studies. Taipei: Center for Asia-Pacific Area Studies, Academia Sinica, pp. 267–295.
- VAN DER GRIJP P. 2007. "Recombination of South Pacific Market Experiences: The Case of Wallis". La Ricerca Folklorica 55: 95–107.
- VAN DER GRIJP P. 2007. "Types en stereotypes: Erotische representatives van het exotische" (= "Types et stéréotypes: représentations érotiques de l'exotique"). Streven 74: 28–39.
- VAN DER GRIJP, P. 2007. "Asian Art Crossing Frontiers: Globalization and Mutual Exoticism in Asia and Europe". Asia-Pacific Forum 36: 268–296.
- VAN DER GRIJP, P. 2007. "Enjeux économiques et identité culturelle aux Îles Tonga." In C. Demmer et M. Salaün (réd.): À l'épreuve du capitalisme: Dynamiques économiques dans le Pacifique, pp. 159–176. [Cahiers du Pacifique Sud Contemporain 4]. Paris: L’Harmattan.
