= Maurice Godelier =

French anthropologist (born 1934)

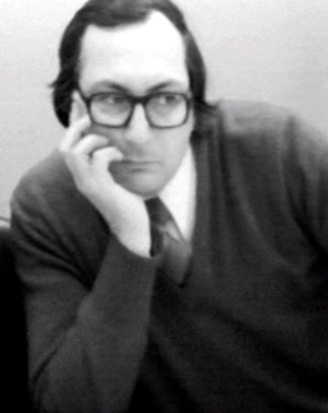
Maurice Godelier, 1977

Maurice Godelier (born 28 February 1934) is a French anthropologist. He is known for his field work among the Baruya in Papua New Guinea from the 1960s to the 1980s, and became one of the earliest advocates of Marxism's incorporation into anthropology. He was a director of studies at the School for Advanced Studies in the Social Sciences in Paris.

== Early life and education ==
Maurice Godelier was born on 28 February 1934 to a poor family in provincial France in the commune Cambrai.

In 1955, Godelier received an associate degree in philosophy, a degree in psychology, and a degree in modern literature. During his early education, he was especially interested in the works of Husserl.

He attended the École normale supérieure de Saint-Cloud from 1955 to 1959 and received an agrégation in philosophy. Godelier developed a specific interest in Marxist theory and politics; influenced by Claude Lévi-Strauss, he chose to pursue the field of anthropology. He participated with other colleagues committed to the left (Elena Cassin, Maxime Rodinson, André-Georges Haudricourt, Charles Malamoud, Jean-Paul Brisson, Jean Yoyotte, Jean Bottero) in a Marxist think tank organised by Jean-Pierre Vernant. This group took on an institutional form with the creation, in 1964, of the Centre des recherches comparées sur les sociétés anciennes, which later became the Centre Louis Gernet (named after Louis Gernet), focusing more on the study of ancient Greece.

== Career ==
Godelier is best known as one of the earliest advocates of Marxism's incorporation into anthropology.

=== Research ===
He is known for his field work among the Baruya people in New Guinea from the 1960s to the 1980s. From 1966 to 1969, he conducted his first major anthropological field study on the Baruya in Papua New Guinea. His research provided significant contributions to the limited understanding of New Guinea cultures. Godelier invited Australian ethnographic filmmaker Ian Dunlop, of the Australian Commonwealth Film Unit, to film their initiation ceremonies, which was produced as a nine-part series called Towards Baruya Manhood in 1973, as well as another 13-part series.

In 1982, he used his research to write an ethnography on the Baruya. The book, entitled The Making of Great Men (La production des grands hommes), discusses sex- and gender-based inequality and provided insight into the systems of power in Melanesia. His analysis of the systems of power was further developed in Big Men and Great Men, published in 1991, which he co-edited with Marilyn Strathern.

In the late 1990s, Godelier addressed the future of peripheral societies under the effects of world capitalism and a new analysis of kinship theory focusing on gender inequality and sexuality.

=== Institutional career ===
In 1963, Godelier initiated the first program on economic anthropology in France at College de France. In this program he focused on refining the Marxist ideas of base and superstructure and modes of production.

From 1982 to 1986, he was scientific director of the Département des Sciences de l'homme et de la société at the French National Centre for Scientific Research (CNRS).

In 1995, he founded the Center for Research and Documentation on Oceania, which he directed until 1999.

He became director of studies at the School for Advanced Studies in the Social Sciences in Paris.

== Other activities ==
From 2000 to 2003, Godelier served on various organizations related to research in social sciences in Europe and his anthropological work in Oceania. He was the president of the Société des océanistes from 2013 to 2015.

== Recognition ==
- 1981: Honorary degree from the Université catholique de Louvain
- 1982: Prix de l'Académie française
- 1990: Prix international Alexander von Humboldt en Sciences Sociales
- 2001: Gold medal of the CNRS
- 2007: Médaille de la Ville de Paris
- 2008: Grand Prix de l'Essai 2008 de la Société des gens de lettres
- 2008: Prix Louis Castex of the Académie Française, for Au fondement des sociétés humaines. Ce que nous apprend l'anthropologie
- 2009: Prix de l'Union Rationaliste, for his life's work
- 2013: Prix de la Fondation Martine Aublet, for Lévi-Strauss

== Selected publications ==
- Rationalité et irrationalité en économie – 1969 (2 volumes) (Rationality and Irrationality in Economics, London : NLB, 1972).
- La production des grands hommes. Pouvoir et domination masculine chez les Baruya de Nouvelle Guinée, Ed. Fayard (1982). (The Making of Great Men. Male domination and Power among the New Guinea Baruya, Cambridge University Press, 1986). Prize of the French Academy.
- L'idéel et le matériel, Ed. Fayard (1984). (The Mental and the Material. Thought, economy and society, Verso,1986).
- L'énigme du don, Ed. Fayard (1996). (The Enigma of the Gift, Chicago, Cambridge; University of Chicago Press, Polity Press, 1998, ISBN 978-0-226-30045-0).
- Meurtre du père, sacrifice de la sexualité,1996.
- La production du corps. Approches anthropologiques et historiques and Le corps humain. Conçu. Supplicié, possédé, cannibalisé. Texts collected and edited by Maurice Godelier and Michel Panoff. Amsterdam, Archives contemporaines (1998).
- Métamorphoses de la parenté. Paris: Fayard.ISBN 2-213-61490-3. OCLC 61137773.
- Lévi-Strauss, Paris: Le Seuil, 2013, (592 p.) / Tr. by Nora Scott, (2018) Claude Lévi-Strauss, A Critical Study of His Thought, Verso books, (560 p.).
