= Joseph Kabris =

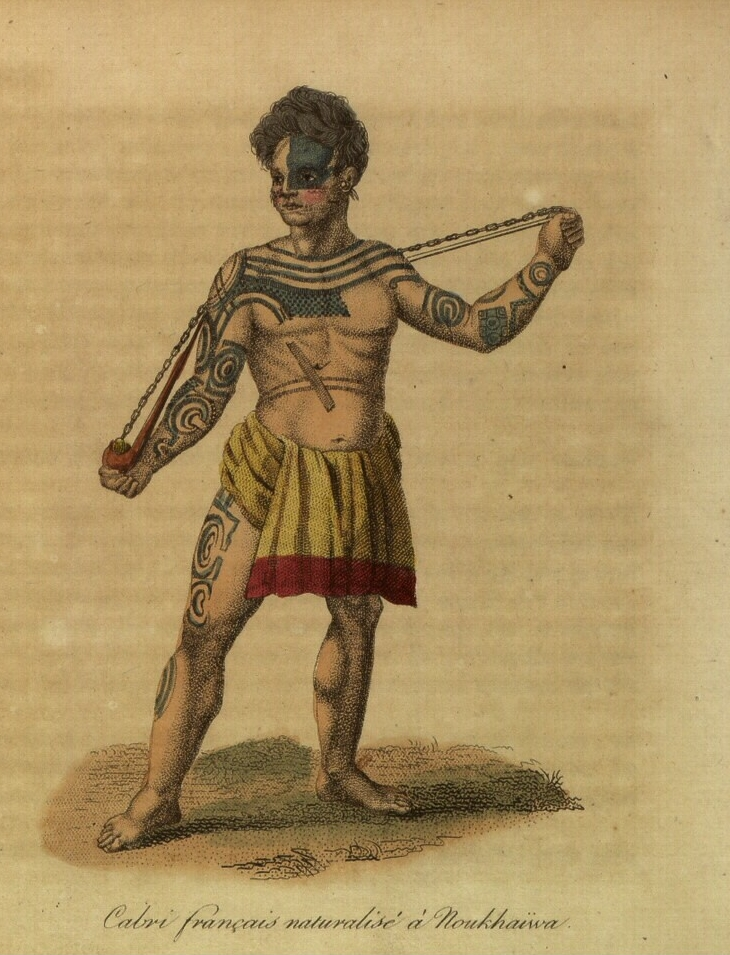
- Born: 1780; Bordeaux, France
- Died: September 18, 1822 (aged 41–42); Valenciennes, France
- Occupation: Sailor

Joseph Kabris (1780 in Bordeaux – 23 September 1822 at Valenciennes), sometimes known as Jean-Baptiste, with alternate last names of Cabri, Cabry, Cabris, Kabrit, or Cadiche, was a sailor shipwrecked in 1795 in the Marquesas Islands, where he integrated into the local society, as evidenced by his full-body tattoos. After leaving the island, he was presented to the courts of Europe as an object of curiosity. Falling on hard times, he exhibited himself at fairs before dying of illness in the north of France at the age of 42.

The American writer Herman Melville is likely to have used Kabris's life in forming the character of Ned Hardy in his second book, Omoo.

== Biography ==
Little is known of his youth except what comes from several brochures he is thought to have dictated, for he was most likely illiterate.

He said he began his life as a sailor quite young, at the age of 14, embarking on the corsair Doumouriez commanded by a Captain Renault. The Doumouriez captured a Spanish galleon and was returning to France when it was captured by a squadron of six English vessels and a frigate. Kabris was taken prisoner and sent to the prison ships (hulks) at Portsmouth, England for 15 months. He returned to service in the royal army and participated in skirmishes around Quiberon. He was wounded in combat and swam over to the British frigate Diamond (captained by Smith), which was anchored in the harbor. Carried to England, he recovered there before resuming work on a whaler (captained by Kuite).

He left Portsmouth on May 8, 1795, for the South Seas on the English brig London, captained by Gardner. He claimed that, after his ship was wrecked near Nuku Hiva (Marquesas Islands), he made it to land along with an English sailor, Edward Robarts, with whom he did not remain friends. In fact, he deserted his ship in March 1798 along with an English sailor named Walker and took refuge on the island of Nuku Hiva.

== Shipwrecked in the Marquesas Islands ==
Kabris, who was thought to have been killed by cannibals, was integrated into the tribe. After a barren first marriage, he married the king's daughter. The king of Nuku Hiva was fond of him and personally tattooed Kabris over all of his body. He named him "Grand Judge of All Countries" with the corresponding tattoo (mehama: a sun on both eyelids).

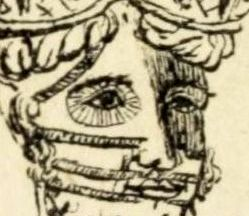
mehama tattoo design around the eyes

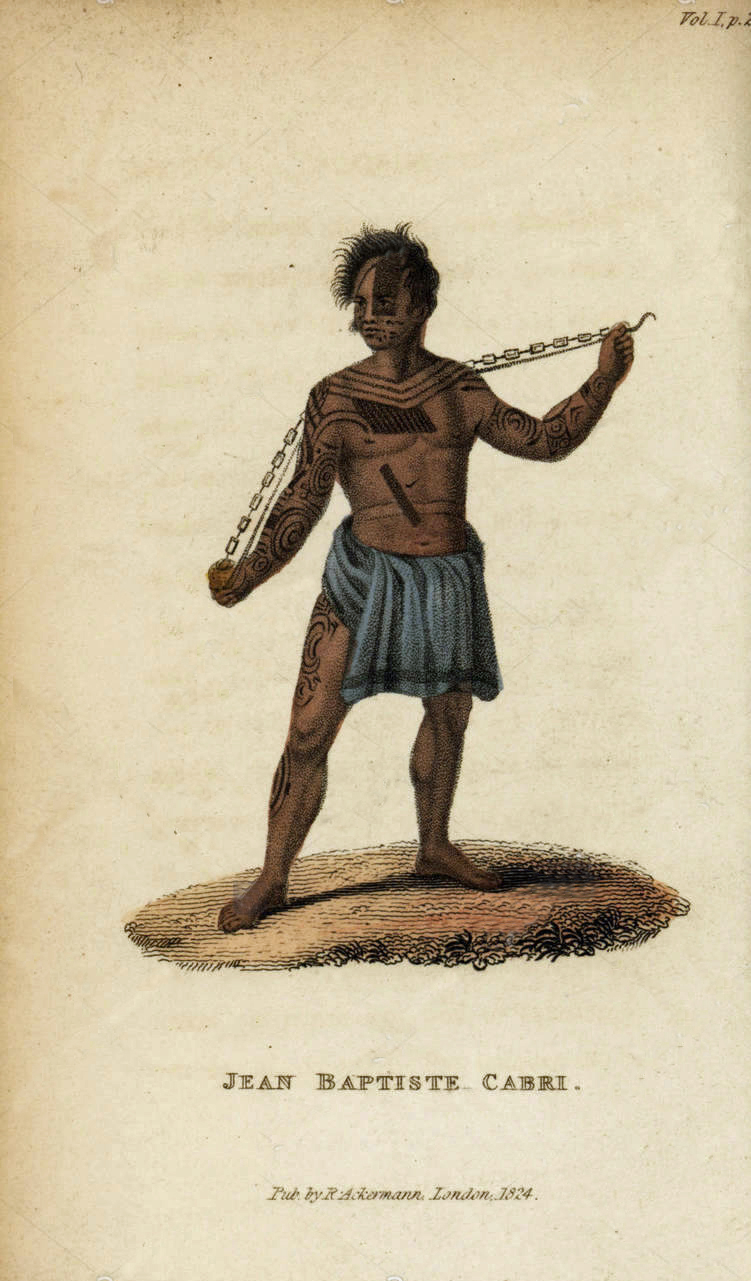
Joseph Kabris,(called Jean Baptiste Cabri), illustration taken from the work by de F. Shoberl, R. Ackermann, London, 1824, p.282

In May 1804, Captain Adam Johann von Krusenstern, who was making an around-the-world voyage, disembarked on the island. He was happy to find the Englishman Roberts (also called Robarts) and the Frenchman Kabris (called Cabri) to serve as his guides. It was Krusenstern and the expedition's naturalist, Georg Heinrich von Langsdorff, who describe the enmity between the two men and who recorded information about Kabris, "he has become entirely Nukuhivan," with his tattoos, his swimming technique, and his comportment as a warrior. He claims to never have become a cannibal," a claim Langsdorff did not believe. Krusenstern stated that Kabris had nearly forgotten his mother tongue but that he spoke English well enough. As his memory returned, he was able to give the name of his father and his city of origin (Bordeaux) which he evoked in an enigmatic way, "Lots of candles, lots of violins, lots of music, the women, the ladies."

== Object of Curiosity in Europe ==
18 May 1804, Kabris embarked, perhaps by accident, on the Russian ship sailing towards Kamtchatka. In August of the same year, he finally arrived at Kamtchatka. Without knowing Russian, he crossed Siberia to reach Saint Petersburg. With his tattoos, he was presented as a curiosity to Czar Alexander I of Russia who kept him thirteen years in his service as a swimming instructor at the Naval academy of Kronstadt.

He remade his life, marrying a French woman named Ariane. He frequented the company of journalist and writer Thaddeus Bulgarin who reported, in his memoirs, that Kabris spoke a very bad mixture of Russian and French which was difficult to follow as it was mixed with the language of savages."

In 1817, he returned to France aboard a ship of the Russian fleet. Sometime after disembarking at Calais on 26 June 1817, he was presented by Armand-Emmanuel de Vignerot du Plessis, duc de Richelieu to Louis XVIII who granted him a sum of money. To earn a living, he would dress as the king of Nuku Hiva, and speaking Marquesan would show his tattoos in fairs, he would also publish pamphlets retelling his life and print engravings showing his royal attributes which he would sell to those who came to see him at the fairs. He hoped to buy some tilling equipment and seed to bring back to Nuku Hiva, and rejoin his family which he left behind on the island of Marquise. But, he was struck by illness and did not realize his plans. He died on 23 September 1822 at the hospital of Valenciennes, 42 years old, a day after recounting his adventures to a judge in Valenciennes.

== Legacy ==
Father Patrick O'Reilly, then secretary general of the Société des Océanistes, believed that the accounts provided by Kabris and Robarts were the first ethnological observations carried out in this archipelago. The two were an indispensable help to captain Adam Johann von Krusenstern during their time in the Marquesas, thanks to their knowledge of the language and local customs. They were also the first to note the cannibalistic activities of the islanders, which neither Captain Cook, his naturalist Forster, during the second voyage of the expedition (1774), nor Captain Marchand in 1791 had noted. Captain Krusenstern wrote, "The two Europeans that we found in Nuku Hiva and who had lived several years on this island, agreed that the inhabitants are depraved, barbaric, and with exception, without excluding even women, cannibals in the fullest extent of the term. He took care to verify this by examining the shattered skulls of their victims. It was also according to their information that Captain Krusenstern estimated that the population of Nuku Hiva in 1804 was 16,000 individuals.
