= Thrower =

Thrower is a surname. Notable people with the surname include:

- Ben Thrower (born 2000), French Horn player
- Debbie Thrower (born 1957), British television presenter
- Edd Thrower (born 1982), English rugby union footballer
- Francis Thrower Fairey (1887–1971), Canadian politician, member of the Canadian House of Commons
- James Thrower (1936–1999), British academic and writer
- Norma Thrower (born 1936), retired Australian hurdler
- Percy Thrower MBE (1913–1988), British gardener, horticulturist, broadcaster and writer
- Peter Thrower (born 1938), professor emeritus of materials science and engineering at Pennsylvania State University
- Randolph W. Thrower (1913–2014), IRS commissioner under Nixon
- Stephen Thrower (born 1963), English musician and author
- Thomas Thrower (1870–1917), Australian politician
- Willie Thrower (1930–2002), American football quarterback

== See also ==
- Bolt Thrower, British death metal band from Coventry, England
- Hat thrower (Pilobolus crystallinus var. crystallinus), species of fungus in the Mucorales order
- Mammoth spear thrower, spear thrower in the form of a mammoth, discovered at the rock shelter of Montastruc, Tarn-et-Garonne, France
- Thrower flashlight, (also call a thrower, long throw, or high powered flashlight)
- Rocket Thrower, bronze sculpture located in Flushing Meadows-Corona Park in Queens New York City
- The Knife Thrower and Other Stories by Steven Millhauser, first published in 1998 by Crown Publishers, Inc., New York
- "The Star Thrower", part of a 16-page essay of the same name by Loren Eiseley (1907–1977)
