= Jean-Paul Brisson =

French poet (1918–2006)

Jean-Paul Brisson (11 September 1918 – 25 June 2006) was a French honorary professor of Latin language and civilisation at the Paris West University Nanterre La Défense. He devoted himself particularly to the social problems of antiquity, North Africa during Antiquity and classical poets.

He participated with other colleagues committed to the left (Elena Cassin, Maxime Rodinson, Maurice Godelier, Charles Malamoud, André-Georges Haudricourt, Jean Yoyotte, Jean Bottero) in a Marxist think tank organised by Jean-Pierre Vernant. This group took on an institutional form with the creation, in 1964, of the Centre des recherches comparées sur les sociétés anciennes, which later became the Centre Louis Gernet, focusing more on the study of ancient Greece.

== Works ==
- 1949: Gloire et misère de l'Afrique chrétienne, Bibliothèque chrétienne d'histoire
- 1958: Autonomisme et christianisme dans l'Afrique romaine, de Septime Sévère à l'invasion vandale, É. de Boccard
- 1959: Spartacus, Club français du livre
- 1966: Virgile, son temps et le nôtre, François Maspero
- 1973: Carthage ou Rome, Fayard
- 1992: Rome et l'âge d'or, de Catulle à Ovide, histoire d'un mythe, La Découverte,
- 2005: Traité des Mystères d'Hilaire de Poitiers, bilingual edition, Éditions du Cerf
