= André-Georges Haudricourt =

French academic (1911–1996)

- Haudricourt in 1983
- Born: 17 January 1911; Paris, France
- Died: 20 August 1996 (aged 85)

Academic work
- Institutions: Centre national de la recherche scientifique
- Main interests: Languages of East Asia, botany
- Notable ideas: Panchronic phonology, tonogenesis

André-Georges Haudricourt (French: [odʁikuʁ]; 17 January 1911 – 20 August 1996) was a French botanist, anthropologist, and linguist.

== Biography ==
He grew up on his parents' farm, in a remote area of Picardy. From his early childhood, he was curious about technology, plants and languages. After he obtained his baccalauréat in 1928, his father advised him to enter the National Institute of Agriculture (Institut national agronomique), in the hope that he would obtain a prestigious position in the administration. However, at graduation (1931), Haudricourt got the worst mark of the entire year group. Unlike his peers, he was interested not in promoting modern tools and technology but in understanding traditional technology, societies and languages. He attended lectures in geography, phonetics, ethnology and genetics in Paris. Marcel Mauss obtained funding for him to go to Leningrad for one year to pursue studies in genetics with Nikolai Vavilov, whose lectures he had attended with great interest at the National Institute of Agriculture.

In 1940, Haudricourt was awarded a position in the new Centre national de la recherche scientifique, in its botany department, but he was disappointed by the research being done there, which relied on static classifications instead of an evolutionary approach espousing the new developments of genetics. In August 1940, the linguist Marcel Cohen entrusted to Haudricourt his library of books about linguistics before he joined the Résistance, as he was afraid that the German occupation army would confiscate his library. That allowed Haudricourt to make extensive readings in linguistics during the Second World War. Meanwhile, he also studied Asian languages at the École nationale des langues orientales vivantes.

Haudricourt decided to switch from the botany department of CNRS to its linguistics department in 1945. In 1947, he presented a PhD dissertation (supervised by André Martinet) about Romance languages. The nonconformist thesis was not accepted by the two reviewers (Albert Dauzat and Mario Roques) and so Haudricourt was not allowed to teach at the École pratique des hautes études. Instead, Haudricourt volunteered to work at the École française d'Extrême-Orient in Hanoi from 1948 to 1949. There, he was able to clarify issues in the historical phonology of Asian languages and to develop general models of language change.

He participated with other colleagues committed to the left (Elena Cassin, Maxime Rodinson, Maurice Godelier, Charles Malamoud, Jean-Paul Brisson, Jean Yoyotte, Jean Bottero) in a Marxist think tank organised by Jean-Pierre Vernant. This group took on an institutional form with the creation, in 1964, of the Centre des recherches comparées sur les sociétés anciennes, which later became the Centre Louis Gernet, focusing more on the study of ancient Greece.

Within the Centre national de la recherche scientifique (CNRS), Haudricourt cofounded in 1976 a research centre whose goal is to investigate little-documented languages within their cultural environment, combining ethnological and linguistic work: the LACITO research centre (Langues et Civilisations à Tradition Orale).

== Work ==
=== Methodological contributions ===
Haudricourt is considered to be the founder of the panchronic program in historical phonology.

=== Tonogenesis ===
His study of the history of Chinese, Vietnamese and other East Asian languages draws on seminal insights. He clarified how a toneless language can become tonal. De l'origine des tons en vietnamien explains tonogenesis in Vietnamese and numerous other East and Southeast Asian languages and paved the way for the reconstruction of nontonal ancestors for the languages of Mainland Southeast Asia, such as Proto-Sino-Tibetan and Proto-Tai. A more comprehensive account of the development and evolution of tonal systems was published by Haudricourt in 1961.

=== Other contributions to the reconstruction of Old Chinese ===
Haudricourt's main legacies to the field of reconstruction of Old Chinese historical phonology, apart from his systematic account of tonogenesis, are his reconstruction of final *-' as well as labiovelars.

Haudricourt clarified several rhyming patterns found in the Book of Odes. Words with final stops /-p -t -k/ rhyme with words in departing tone (Chinese: 去聲; pinyin: qùshēng) according to their Middle Chinese pronunciation. For instance, words in the zhà 乍 and zuó 昨 series (Middle Chinese: *dzraeH and *dzak, respectively) rhyme, as do words in the bì 敝 and piē 瞥 series (Middle Chinese: *bjiejH and *phiet). That led Karlgren to reconstruct a voiced series of finals: /*-d/, /*-g/ and (in some cases) /*-b/. Haudricourt's theory, which states that the departing tone comes from *-s, explains that phenomenon. The words with departing tone rhyming with words in final stop should be reconstructed with final clusters *-ks, *-ts or *-ps. Moreover, from the point of view of historical morphology, Haudricourt's theory of tonogenesis leads to the reconstruction of several *-s suffixes (in particular a nominalizing suffix) which can be shown to be cognate with those found in conservative Sino-Tibetan languages such as Tibetan.

A second major finding is his hypothesis that labiovelars existed in Old Chinese:

"...it seems that scholars have overlooked the fact that some rhymes in the Analytic Dictionary only appear with velar initials (/k/, /kʰ/, /g/, /x/, and /ŋ/), for instance -iʷei [MC *-wej] 齊, -ʷâng [*-wang] 唐, -iʷäng [*-jwieng] 清, -ʷâk [*-wak] 鐸, -iʷet [*-wet] 屑 etc." (Middle Chinese reconstructions added in square brackets are from Baxter 1992.).

The idea was used later to revise the reconstruction of the Old Chinese vowel system and is the basis for the six-vowel system common to recent systems.
