= Juliette Blevins =

American linguist (born 1960)

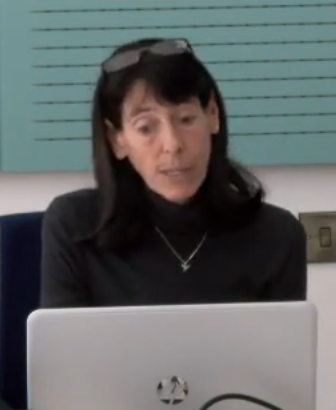
- Blevins in 2019
- Born: Juliette Levin; 1960 (age 65–66)
- Citizenship: United States; Australia
- Children: 3

Academic background
- Education: Massachusetts Institute of Technology
- Thesis: A Metrical Theory of Syllabicity (1985)
- Website: http://julietteblevins.ws.gc.cuny.edu/

Juliette Blevins (née Levin; born 1960) is an American linguist whose work has contributed to the fields of phonology, phonetics, historical linguistics, and typology. She is currently professor of linguistics at the Graduate Center, CUNY.

== Career ==
Blevins received her PhD in linguistics from the Massachusetts Institute of Technology in 1985.

She worked as the senior research scientist at the department of linguistics at the Max Planck Institute for Evolutionary Anthropology in Leipzig from 2004 to 2010. She has also worked as a professor at University of California, Berkeley, University of Luton, University of Western Australia, and University of Texas at Austin before joining the faculty of CUNY in 2010.

== Research ==
Blevins's research spans several sub-disciplines and features Austronesian, Australian Aboriginal, Andamanese, Native American languages, and more recently Basque. She is the founder of the approach of Evolutionary phonology. This approach seeks to explain the cross-linguistic similarity of sound patterns by examining the regular processes of sound change. This approach argues that many common sound patterns in contemporary phonologies are not necessarily reflections of underlying universal properties of languages, but rather the result of sound changes that are guided by the common tendencies of language transmission.

In 2001, Blevins published a sketch grammar of Nhanda, based on her work with the last remaining speakers.

== Honors ==
In 2020, Blevins was inducted as a Fellow of the Linguistic Society of America.

She is the director of the Endangered Language Initiative, co-director of the Endangered Language Alliance, and a co-founder of the Yurok Language Project.

== Select publications ==
- 2001. Nhanda: An Aboriginal language of Western Australia. Oceanic Linguistics Special Publications in Linguistics, Number 30. Honolulu: University of Hawaiʻi Press.
- 2004. Evolutionary phonology: The emergence of sound patterns. Cambridge: Cambridge University Press.
- 2007. "Endangered sound patterns: Three perspectives on theory and description." Language Documentation and Conservation 1: 1-16.
- 2007. "The importance of typology in explaining recurrent sound patterns." Linguistic Typology 11:107-113.
- 2009. "Another universal bites the dust: Northwest Mekeo lacks coronal phonemes." Oceanic Linguistics 48: 264-73.
- 2009. "Low vowel dissimilation outside Oceanic: The case of Alamblak." Oceanic Linguistics 48:2: 477-83.
- 2010. "Saving endangered languages in the United States. A Living Legacy: Preserving Intangible Culture." Washington, D.C.: United States Department of State, Bureau of International Information Programs. 6-10.
- 2012. "Duality of patterning: Absolute universal or statistical tendency? " Language and Cognition 4: 275-96. Special issue. Bart de Boer, Simon Kirby, and Wendy Sandler (eds.).
