= Baruya people =

Tribe in the highlands of Papua New Guinea

The Baruya are a people of the highlands of Papua New Guinea. They were extensively studied by French anthropologist Maurice Godelier between 1967 and 1988.

== Description ==
In 1973, there were approximately 1,500 Baruya people living in the Wonenara and Marawaka valleys. They have been described as characterised by a strong inequality between males and females; all their organisations, institutions, and myths present male domination. They have traditionally practised a ritual in which boys give fellatio to young males and drink their semen, to "re-engender themselves prior to marriage". According to French anthropologist Maurice Godelier,

Within sacred objects, which are the exclusive property of some clans and which only some men are allowed to touch and to handle, two types of power are united: feminine powers, the life powers of which the men are supposed to have exproprietated women in imaginary times, and masculine powers, powers of death and war received directly from the spirits of the forest. But in the eyes of the Baruyas, women remain for ever the owners of the powers of which the men have dispossessed them, even if they have lost their usage. It is for this reason that the men violently separate the boys from the world of women and must initiate them in the secrets of the powers of which they have dispossessed the women. The Baruya men justify this expropriation by saying that the first women did not know how to put their powers in the service of the community.

However, according to a 2016 study by Anne-Sylvie Malbrancke, "male domination is no longer ideologically inscribed in the superiority of semen by analysing the symbolic shift that both semen and menstrual blood have undergone and showing how closely tied this shift is to a new organisation of gendered roles and places within Baruya society".

== Studies and film ==
For seven years between 1967 and 1988, French anthropologist Maurice Godelier, assistant of Claude Lévi-Strauss, lived among the Baruya people and studied them. Godelier invited Australian ethnographic filmmaker Ian Dunlop, of the Australian Commonwealth Film Unit, to film their initiation ceremonies, which was produced as a nine-part series called Towards Baruya Manhood in 1973, as well as another 13-part series.
