= Steuart Campbell =

British writer (born 1937)

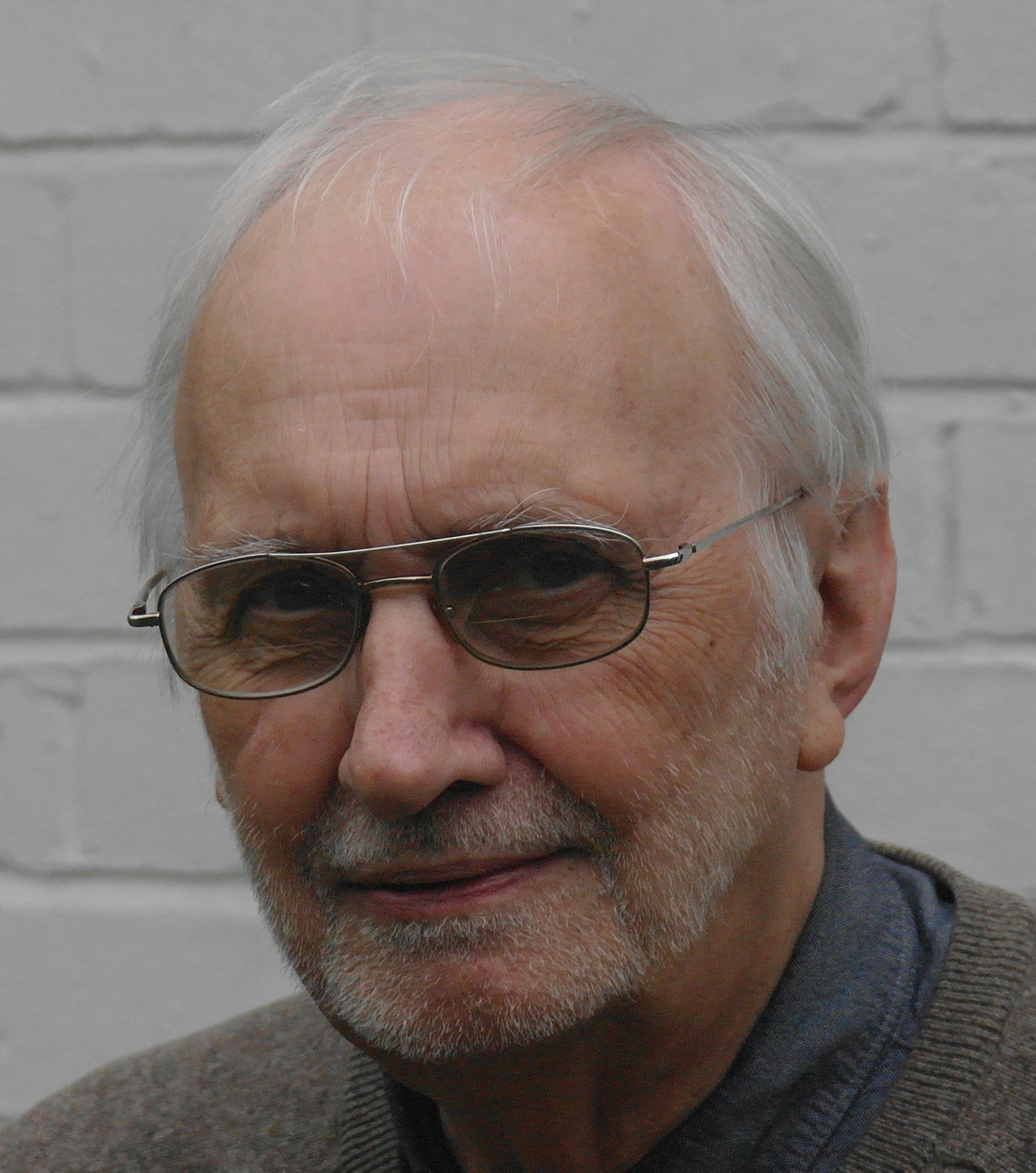
- Photo taken 2019
- Born: Stuart Barnsley Campbell; 1937 (age 88–89); Birmingham
- Occupation: Science writer
- Website: www.steuartcampbell.com

Steuart Campbell (born 1937) is a British writer and skeptic who lives in Edinburgh.

== Career ==
Campbell was born in 1937 in Birmingham. He trained as an architect and worked as one until the mid-1970s. He obtained a BA in mathematics and science from the Open University in 1983. He wrote The Loch Ness Monster: The Evidence which argues against the existence of the Loch Ness Monster. The book examines eyewitness reports, as well as photos and instrumental evidence. Campbell concluded that the alleged sightings are best explained by logs, otters, ripples, seiches, wakes and hoaxes.

In 1994 Campbell's book The UFO Mystery Solved was published by Explicit. The work was reviewed in the Journal of Meteorology as "a well-researched book" that will assist in dispelling the mysteries surrounding unidentified flying objects. Campbell is a former Christian who later authored a sceptical work on Christianity, The Rise and Fall Of Jesus published in 1996. The book was republished in 2019.

Campbell has written articles for Skeptical Inquirer, The Skeptic magazine and The Scotsman.

== Selected publications ==
- The Loch Ness Monster: The Evidence. 1986 The Aquarian Press (Thorsons Publishing Group) Wellingborough: ISBN 0850304512; Revised ed. 1991 Aberdeen University Press (Macmillan Pergamon Publishing Corporation) Aberdeen: ISBN 1573921785; 1996 Birlinn Ltd, Edinburgh: ISBN 1874744610; 1997 (without subtitle); Prometheus Books, Amhurst: ISBN 1573921785; 2002 Birlinn Ltd, Edinburgh 1997: ISBN 1841581984). Argues against the existence of the Loch Ness Monster by analysis of the purported evidence.
- The UFO Mystery Solved 1994 Explicit Books, Edinburgh: ISBN 0952151200. A critical examination of UFO reports and their explanation in terms of meteorological and astronomical phenomena;
- The Rise and Fall of Jesus with a foreword by Prof. James Thrower 1996 Explicit Books, Edinburgh: ISBN 0952151219; 2009 Revised and updated ed. WPS (WritersPrintShop): ISBN 1904623735; 2019 Revised 3rd ed. Tectum Verlag (Nomos Publishing Company), Marburg: ISBN 9783828843462 (print), ISBN 9783828873278 (ePDF). Exploration of the origins of Christianity, asserting that Jesus wanted to be crucified.
- Chinook Crash (The crash of RAF Chinook helicopter ZD576 on the Mull of Kintyre) 2004 Pen & Sword Aviation (Pen & Sword Books Ltd, Barnsley) ISBN 1844150747 (print) ISBN 9781473803480 (ebook). An examination of and an explanation for the fatal crash on 2 June 1994.
