= Charles Fossey =

French assyriologist

Charles Fossey (29 July 1869 – 27 November 1946) was a French assyriologist. In education he was a follower and colleague of Émile Durkheim.

Living at the turn of the century, he made a significant contribution to Assyriology and studied the magic of Jerusalem. His work and contribution to science has remained unnoticed only because of the socio-political situation of the time.

Charles Fossey was primarily an archaeologist. He organised a number of expeditions to the Middle East.

Fossey was a disciple of the famous French sociologist Émile Durkheim, which was reflected in the methodical side of his research in the field of social relations in Mesopotamia.

Charles Fossey had no high-profile titles or honours: his whole life was dedicated to his one passion, Assyriology.

Nevertheless, he held the following positions:

- Member of the French school in Athens (1894–1897).
- Member of the French Institute of Oriental Archaeology in Cairo (1897–1899).
- Professor of Philosophy and Assyrian archaeology at the Collège de France (1906–1939).
- Director of Studies at the School of Practical Advanced Study (1907–1938).
- Inspector of printing in the National press.

One of his pupils was Elena Cassin when she arrived in Paris in 1932.

== Works ==
- La Magie assyrienne 1902
- Manuel d'Assyriologie Paris, 1904
- Jérusalem Magie Rituels, 1910
