= The Universe, the Gods, and Men =

1999 book by Jean-Pierre Vernant

- Author: Jean-Pierre Vernant
- Original title: L'univers, les dieux, les hommes
- Translator: Linda Asher
- Language: French
- Series: La librairie du XXe siècle
- Subject: Greek mythology
- Publisher: Éditions du Seuil
- Publication date: 1999
- Publication place: France
- English publication date: 2001
- Media type: Print
- Pages: 244 (first edition)
- ISBN: 2-02-038227-X

The Universe, the Gods, and Men (French: L'univers, les dieux, les hommes) is a 1999 book by the French writer Jean-Pierre Vernant. It consists of retellings of stories from Greek mythology, inspired by how Vernant had told them to his grandson years previously.

== Background ==
Jean-Pierre Vernant was a historian and anthropologist specialized on ancient Greece. He was approached by the editor Maurice Olender of Éditions du Seuil, which had published two scholarly works by Vernant in its series La librairie du XXe siècle; the series was celebrating its tenth anniversary, and Olender asked Vernant to write his retellings of Greek myths and turn them into a book for the series.

Vernant wanted to retain the non-codified element of how myths had been transmitted in the ancient world, and thought it was suitable to tell the stories like an old man does to a child; thirty years previously, he had done this to his grandson. This allowed him to create his own variations of the myths within certain limitations. He explained that he saw ancient Greek culture as very important and as something children should be introduced to by adults they know. He did not think it was necessary to view the ancient Greek man as a model, but as someone who represents interesting choices in ethics, aesthetics and religion.

== Summary ==
The book introduces stories from Greek mythology along with Vernant's comments and interpretations of the myths. It covers the origin of the world, Zeus' ascendance and the world of humans, relying on Hesiod's Theogony and Aeschylus. It covers the Trojan War by focusing on the Apple of Discord and the Odyssey by focusing on Odysseus' reintegration after his voyage. The book stresses the prominent role of Dionysus, who highlights the differences between the native and the other. It goes through the Theban Cycle from the rape of Europa and the founding of the city of Cadmus to the life of Oedipus. The final chapter tells the story of Perseus.

== Reception ==
The original French edition of The Universe, the Gods, and Men was published in 1999 by Éditions du Seuil. The English translation by Linda Asher was published by HarperCollins in 2001. Patrick Kaplanian wrote in L'Homme that those who seek to familiarize themselves with Greek mythology "will find nothing better than this book", which presents many conclusions from Vernant's scholarly publications in a way that is accessible for general readers. Publishers Weekly wrote: "Those seeking a first-rate account of the meanings and origins of the Greek myths, as well as a fresh and absorbing narrative, will find no better guide than Vernant."
