= Hilary Chappell =

Linguist

Hilary Margaret Chappell（曹茜蕾） is a professor of linguistics at the School for Advanced Studies in the Social Sciences (EHESS) in Paris. Her research focuses on grammaticalization and the typology of the Sinitic languages.

== Biography ==
Chappell graduated from the Australian National University in 1978 with first-class honours in Asia Studies and went on to pursue a PhD at the same institution, awarded in 1984 for a thesis entitled “A semantic analysis of passive, causative and dative constructions in standard Chinese”. After research stays at the University of Cologne as a Humboldt fellow (1984–1986) and at UCSB and the University of Southern California as a Fulbright scholar (1987–1988), she took up a position as Reader in the linguistics department at La Trobe University, Melbourne, where she taught for eighteen years. In 2005 she was appointed senior researcher first class at the French National Centre for Scientific Research and professor at EHESS, serving in 2007–8 as director of its Centre for Linguistic Research on East Asia (Centre de Recherches Linguistiques sur l’Asie Orientale, CRLAO).

Chappell has been the recipient of numerous honours and awards. In 1999 she received a Senior Scholar award from the Chiang Ching-kuo Foundation of Taiwan. From 2005 to 2009 she served as editor-in-chief of the journal Cahiers de Linguistique Asie Orientale. In 2009 she taught an invited course on the typology of Sinitic languages at the LSA Summer Institute at UC Berkeley. In 2010 she was elected as a member of the Academia Europaea. Between 2009 and 2013 she held an ERC Advanced Grant for her project SINOTYPE on the hybrid syntactic typology of Sinitic languages. Between 2015 and 2017 she held a visiting position as a high-level foreign specialist at Shanghai Jiao Tong University, funded by the Chinese Ministry of Education.

== Research ==
Chappell has worked on various topics in the synchrony and diachrony of the Sinitic languages, particularly from the perspective of grammaticalization and linguistic typology. Her work on object-marking constructions is based on evidence from over 600 Chinese dialects, and she has carried out extensive fieldwork on the Xianghua language of Hunan province. Her work on areal patterns of grammaticalization makes the case that there are five major dialect areas within China.

== Selected publications ==
- Chappell, Hilary M. 1980. Is the get‐passive adversative? Research on Language & Social Interaction 13 (3), 411–452. doi:10.1080/08351818009370504
- Chappell, Hilary M., and William McGregor (eds.). 1996. The grammar of inalienability: A typological perspective on body part terms and the part-whole relation. Berlin: Mouton de Gruyter. ISBN 9783110128048
- Chappell, Hilary M., and William McGregor. 1996. Prolegomena to a theory of inalienability. In Chappell & McGregor (eds.), 3–30.
- Chappell, Hilary M. 2001. Language contact and areal diffusion in Sinitic languages: problems for typology and genetic affiliation. In R. M. W. Dixon & Alexandra Y. Aikhenvald (eds.), Areal Diffusion and Genetic Inheritance: Problems in Comparative Linguistics, 328–357. Oxford: Oxford University Press.
- Chappell, Hilary M. (ed.). 2001. Sinitic grammar: synchronic and diachronic perspectives. Oxford: Oxford University Press. ISBN 9780198299776
- Chappell, Hilary M. 2008. Variation in the grammaticalization of complementizers from verba dicendi in Sinitic languages. Linguistic Typology 12 (1), 45–98. doi:10.1515/LITY.2008.032
- Chappell, Hilary M. (ed.). 2015. Diversity in Sinitic languages. Oxford: Oxford University Press. ISBN 9780198723790
