= James Thrower =

James Arthur Thrower (1936–1999) was an academic and writer on religion.

After studying at the University of Durham (BA Theology) and University of Oxford (Philosophy), he lectured at the University of Leicester, University of Ghana, and University of Durham. He became a lecturer in religion at the University of Aberdeen in 1970. His PhD thesis there in 1981 was on Marxist-Leninist 'Scientific Atheism' and the Study of Religion and Atheism in the USSR. He worked as a visiting lecturer at the Universities of Helsinki, Leningrad and Warsaw. He later became Professor of the History of Religions and Director of the Centre for Study of Religions at Aberdeen. His works include A Short History of Western Atheism (1971), The Alternative Tradition (1981) and Religion: The Classical Theories (1999). In 1996 he wrote the foreword for Steuart Campbell's work The Rise and Fall of Jesus, which examines the Jesus myth and the origins of Christianity. It suggests that Jesus wanted to be crucified. He died suddenly on 14 November 1999, and his wife, Judith, died in 2016. They had three children, Penelope, Charlotte and Annabel.

Reza Aslan used Thrower as an example of someone who thought that atheism was a belief system in its own right and not just a negation of belief.
