= Evolutionary phonology =

Theoretical framework in linguistics

Evolutionary Phonology is an approach to phonology and historical linguistics, based on the idea that recurrent synchronic sound patterns, if not inherited from the mother tongue, are the result of recurrent sound changes, while rare patterns are the product of rare changes or a combination of independent changes.

== Bibliography ==
- Blevins, Juliette. 2004. Evolutionary phonology: The emergence of sound patterns. Cambridge University Press.
