= Clarisse Herrenschmidt =

French archaeologist and linguist

Clarisse Herrenschmidt (born 1946, Strasbourg) is a French archaeologist, historian, philologist and linguist. She has been a researcher at the French National Centre for Scientific Research since 1978 and is a professor at the Social Anthropology Laboratory of the Collège de France. She is known for her researches into Achaemenid Iran, in particular the ideology and kinship structures of the early Persian royalty. She won the Prix Georges-Dumézil of the Académie Française in 2008.

== Life ==
Clarisse Herrenschmidt was born in Strasbourg in 1946. She obtained a Licence de Lettres (including Sanskrit studies) from the University of Strasbourg in 1967, and further degrees in archaeology and the history of art in Paris (1968–1969). She received a diploma in Persian and Kurdish from the Institut national des langues et civilisations orientales in 1971–1972, as well as in transformational and generative grammars from Paris VIII. In 1975, she graduated with a master's degree in Iranian studies; her thesis titled Étude formelle et interprétation historique des inscriptions en Vieux-Perse de Darius le Grand was supervised by Gilbert Lazard. She received a doctoral degree, supervised by ; her dissertation was titled Analyse formelle et interprétation historique des inscriptions royales achéménides.

== Career ==
Herrenschmidt spent six months on site at the Ai-Khanum archaeological dig in Afghanistan, supervised by Paul Bernard. She joined the Académie des Inscriptions et Belles Lettres in the publications department, working with André Dupont-Sommer.

In her work on linguistic evolution and the development of writing, in particular that of Persian from its Elamite antecedents, Herrenschmidt discussed the significance of words, speech, their representation as signs, and the use of script as an ordering on earth of divine will. The marking of vowels in the Old Persian logograms for five important concepts (the god Ahura Mazda, the king, the earth, the people and the notion of God) specified which should be pronounced and which should not. The king utters the divine words but does so on behalf of his people, thereby reinforcing the social order as taught by Zoroaster. The extended question of whether the Achaemenids were Zoroastrians or not was further summarised by Herrenschmidt: treated as worshippers of Ahura Mazda, the Achaemenids could be classified as such, but given the lack of any references to Zoroaster (as prophet or otherwise) in the writings of Cyrus and descendants, it was equally arguable that they weren't.

A question that exercised classicists and Iranists was on the direction of intellectual influences between ancient Greece and Persia. Prior to the 1940s, the thesis was that Persian doctrines influenced Greek thought, as evidenced for instance by Heraclitus' view of the importance of fire. Thereafter, critical analyses moved the direction the other way, with Aristotelian categories appearing in Persian writings, and a west-to-east influence accepted in the Sassanian period. Herrenschmidt, in 1996, however, provided a compelling demonstration of the Iranian ideas of embryology leading to Democritus's own theory, which were explicitly counter to Greek ideas. Zoroastrian elemental thought held that moist and warm were divine features, while dry and cold were demonic; the male seed, they believed, was hot and dry, stemming from the brain, while the female seed was cold and moist, stemming from the lower body. The meeting of the two seeds (separately inert) countered each other's demonic aspects and led to fertilisation. The Greeks generally denied the potence of the female seed, claiming it to be a vessel for the life spark coming solely from the male, but Democritus believed that both female and male seeds were requisite for life, and that the preponderance of one seed over the other led to the sex of the offspring, an idea more in keeping with the Zoroastrian than the Greek.

Herrenschmidt's 2007 work Les trois écritures. Langue, nombre, code explored the evolution of writing from the fourth millennium BC to modern times. It articulated three modes of writing: of languages, numbers, and of computer codes. It analysed the relationship between the material objects in the world and objects in language (and the distancing caused by language), and between the ways of writing and the ways of thinking. But cultural inertia, tradition and resistance to standardisation imply slow changes in the regimes of writing. Graphic regimes vary over time, while conveying a part of cultural inertia. The first part of the book lucidly described the advent of writing in Mesopotamia, with the relationships between things and written signs found in Uruk, where the first signs, pictograms, logograms appear. It goes on to the development of consonantal alphabetical writing among the Phoenicians and the Jews, a system relying on a different logic of construction: words developing from roots. The book then described the Greek alphabet as a culmination of the process, with the word being less important than the letters, which are treated equally - along the lines of an egalitarian citizenry. The second part, dealing with numeric writing, focussed on the monetary aspect and the connections between mathematics and economics. It analyzed the monetary writing of Ionian Greece, starting from the Artemision of Ephesus and proposing an in-depth analysis of Herodotus' story of the offerings of Croesus and his fate, in relation to Artemis. This led to a link between the rites celebrated in Ephesus and the invention of money. In the final part, the book discussed the development of computer languages and its causes and effects on human thought processes, as well as the overlay of an Anglo-American culture. The work was lauded as written with erudition, finesse and originality. It won the Prix Georges-Dumézil of the Académie Française in 2008.

== Selected works ==
- Herrenschmidt, Clarisse (2007). Les trois écritures: langue, nombre, code (in French). Gallimard. ISBN 978-2-07-076025-1.
- Bottéro, Jean; Herrenschmidt, Clarisse; Vernant, Jean-Pierre (15 June 2000). Ancestor of the West: Writing, Reasoning, and Religion in Mesopotamia, Elam, and Greece. Translated by Teresa L. Fagan. University of Chicago Press. ISBN 978-0-226-06715-5.
- Briant, Pierre; Herrenschmidt, Clarisse, eds. (1994) [1989]. Le tribut dans l'Empire perse (in French). Peeters. ISBN 9782908322149.

== Bibliography ==
- Bonnet, Corinne (2008). "Les trois écritures. Langue, nombre, code, Bibliothèque des sciences humaines by Clarisse Herrenschmidt". Anabases (7). doi:10.4000/anabases.2555. JSTOR 43595799.
- Bonte, Pierre (1997). "J. Bottéro, C. Herrenschmidt, J.-P. Vernant, L'Orient ancien et nous. L'écriture, la raison, les dieux: compte-rendu". L'Homme (in French). 37 (144).
- Duchesne-Guillemin, Jacques, ed. (1979). "Clarisse Herrenschmidt". Acta Iranica. collection fondée à l'occasion du 2500e anniversaire de la Fondation de l'Empire Perse par Cyrus le Grand. Vol. 20. Brill. ISBN 9789004059412.
- "Le Prix Georges Dumezil 2008 a été décerné à Madame Clarisse HERRENSCHMIDT". l’Institut d’Etudes Avancées de Nantes. 10 December 2008.
- Lincoln, Bruce (2001). "The Center of the World and the Origins of Life". History of Religions. 40 (4): 311–326. doi:10.1086/463646. JSTOR 3176369. S2CID 161405128.
- Lincoln, Bruce (2003). "À la Recherche du Paradis Perdu". History of Religions. 43 (2): 139–154. doi:10.1086/423008. JSTOR 423008. S2CID 162335303.
- Sini, Carlo (2002). La scrittura e il debito: conflitto tra culture e antropologia. Jaca Book. ISBN 978-88-16-40581-3.
