= Société des Océanistes =

Scientific society dedicated to Oceania

The Société des Océanistes ('Society of Oceanicists') is a French scientific society, founded in 1936, that brings together specialists and interdisciplinary scholars of the cultures and societies of Oceania. It was originally located at the Musée de l'Homme in Paris, but moved to the Musée du quai Branly in 2006. Since 2020, Pascale Bonnemère has been the president of the organization.

The Society published a journal, the Journal de la Société des Océanistes, with the aid of the Centre national de la recherche scientifique (France) and the Centre national de littérature (Luxembourg).

== Presidency ==
- 1945–1952: Maurice Leenhardt
- 1953–1971: Roger Heim
- 1972–1982: Jean Guiart
- 1982–1994: José Garanger
- 1994–1997: Michel Panoff
- 1998: Michel Levallois
- 1999–2000: Jean-Christophe Galipaud
- 2001–2003: Jean-Paul Latouche
- 2004–2015: Maurice Godelier
- 2016–2020: Emmanuel Kasarhérou
- since 2020: Pascale Bonnemère

== See also ==
- Polynesian Society
