= Jean-Pierre Vernant =

French historian and anthropologist (1914–2007)

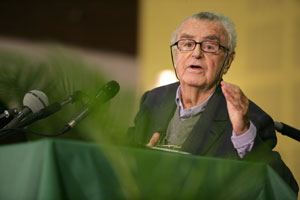
- Vernant in 2006
- Born: January 4, 1914; Provins, France
- Died: January 9, 2007 (aged 93); Sèvres, France
- Scientific career
- Fields: Anthropologist, historian

Jean-Pierre Vernant (French: [vɛʁnɑ̃]; January 4, 1914 – January 9, 2007) was a French resistant, historian and anthropologist, specialist in ancient Greece. Influenced by Claude Lévi-Strauss, Vernant developed a structuralist approach to Greek myth, tragedy, and society which would itself be influential among classical scholars. He was an honorary professor at the Collège de France.

== Biography ==
Born in Provins, France, Vernant at first studied philosophy, receiving his agrégation in this field in 1937.

A member of the Young Communists (Jeunes Communistes), Vernant joined the French Resistance during World War II and was a member of Libération-sud (founded by Emmanuel d'Astier). He later commanded the French Forces of the Interior (FFI) in Haute-Garonne under the pseudonym of "Colonel Berthier." He was a Companion of the Liberation. After the war, he remained a member of the French Communist Party until 1969.

He entered the Centre national de la recherche scientifique (CNRS) in 1948 and, under the influence of Louis Gernet, turned to the study of ancient Greek anthropology. Ten years later, he became director of studies at the École des hautes études en sciences sociales (EHESS). In 1971 he was professor in the University of São Paulo. This visit was also an act of protest that he made with François Châtelet against the brazilian military government (dictatorship).

He was a member of the French sponsorship committee for the Decade for the Promotion of a Culture of Peace and Non-Violence for the Children of the World. He supported the funding organisation Non-Violence XXI.

He was awarded the CNRS gold medal in 1984. In 2002, he received an honorary doctorate at the University of Crete.

Vernant died a few days after his 93rd birthday in Sèvres.

After his death, his name was given to a French highschool in Sèvres, le "Lycée Jean-Pierre Vernant".

== Influence ==
The structuralist approach pioneered by Vernant has been influential on a wide range of classical scholars. More specifically, Vernant's reading of the myth of Prometheus was an important influence on philosopher Bernard Stiegler's book, Technics and Time, 1: The Fault of Epimetheus.

== Criticism ==
Vernant's approach has been heavily criticized, particularly among Italian philologists, even by those of Marxist tendencies. He has been accused of a fundamentally ahistorical approach, allegedly going as far as to manipulate his sources by describing them in categories which do not apply (polysemy and ambiguity).

== Awards ==
=== Honours ===
- Commander of the Légion d'honneur
- Grand Cross of the Ordre national du Mérite
- Compagnon de la Libération
- Croix de Guerre
- Officier of the Ordre des Arts et des Lettres
- Commander of the Order of the Phoenix (Greece)

=== Awards and prizes ===
- 1980 : Amic Award of the Académie Française (France)
- 1984 : Médaille d'or du CNRS (France)
- 1991 : Gold Medal of History (San Marino)
- 1993 : Award for Humanistic Studies of the American Academy of Arts & Sciences (USA)

=== Honorary degrees ===
- University of Chicago
- University of Bristol
- Masaryk University of Brno
- University of Naples
- University of Oxford
- University of Crete (2002)
- New Bulgarian University (2004)

=== Other awards ===
- Associate member of the Académie royale de Belgique
- Foreign honorary member of the American Academy of Arts and Sciences
- Corresponding Fellow of the British Academy
- Honorary Member of the Society for the Promotion of Hellenic Studies

== Select publications ==
- Les origines de la pensée grecque (Paris), 1962 (= Origins of Greek Thought, 1982)
- Mythe et pensée chez les Grecs: Etudes de psychologie historique (Paris), 1965 (= Myth and Thought among the Greeks, 1983)
- With Pierre Vidal-Naquet: Mythe et tragédie en Grèce ancienne, 2 vols. (Paris), 1972, 1986 (= Tragedy and Myth in Ancient Greece, 1981; Myth and Tragedy in Ancient Greece, 1988)
- Mythe et société en Grèce ancienne (Paris), 1974 (= Myth and Society in Ancient Greece, 1978)
- Divination et rationalité, 1974
- With Marcel Detienne: Les ruses de l'intelligence: La mètis des Grecs (Paris), 1974 (= Cunning Intelligence in Greek Culture and Society, 1977)
- Religion grecque, religions antiques (Paris), 1976
- Religion, histoires, raisons (Paris), 1979
- With Marcel Detienne: La cuisine de sacrifice en pays grec (Paris), 1979 (= Cuisine of Sacrifice among the Greeks, 1989)
- With Pierre Vidal-Naquet: Travail et esclavage en Grèce ancienne (Brussels), 1988
- L'individu, la mort, l'amour: soi-même et l'autre en Grèce ancienne (Paris), 1989
- Mythe et religion en Grèce ancienne (Paris), 1990
- Figures, idoles, masques (Paris), 1990
- With Pierre Vidal-Naquet: La Grèce ancienne, 3 vols. (Paris), 1990–92
- Mortals and Immortals: Collected Essays (Princeton), 1991
- With Pierre Vidal-Naquet: Œdipe et ses mythes (Brussels), 1994
- Entre mythe et politique (Paris), 1996
- With Jean Bottéro and Clarisse Herrenschmidt: (in French) L'orient ancien et nous (Paris), 1996. (in English) Ancestor of the West: Writing, Reasoning, and Religion in Mesopotamia, Elam, and Greece, translated by Teresa Lavender Fagan. University of Chicago Press, 2000. ISBN 978-0226067155.
- With Françoise Frontisi-Ducroux: Dans l'œil du miroir (Paris), 1997
- L'univers, les dieux, les hommes: récits grecs des origines Paris, Le Seuil, 1999 (= The Universe, The Gods, and Men: Ancient Greek Myths, 2001)
- La traversée des frontières (Paris), 2004
