= Louis Gernet =

French philologist and sociologist (1882–1962)

Louis Gernet (28 November 1882 – 29 January 1962) was a French philologist and sociologist.

== Life ==
A student at the École Normale Supérieure (class of 1902), he received a licentiate in law and agrégation in grammar. In 1917, supported by the Fondation Thiers, he received his doctorate in letters with a dissertation entitled "Researches on the development of legal and moral thought in Greece".

For a long time he led a modest academic career, devoted to teaching Greek at the University of Algiers. In 1948, at the age of 66, he went to the seminary of legal sociology at the École Pratique des Hautes Études to teach ancient Greek anthropology. From 1949 to 1961 he was editor of the journal L'Année sociologique, to which he also contributed under the heading "Legal and moral sociology".

In 1964, two years after Gernet's death, his pupil Jean-Pierre Vernant founded the Centre Louis-Gernet, a centre for the comparative study of ancient societies which is attached to the École des Hautes Études en Sciences Sociales.

== Principal works ==
- Recherches sur le développement de la pensée juridique en Grèce ancienne, 1917 (doctoral dissertation; republ. Albin Michel, 2001)
- With André Boulanger: Le Génie grec dans la religion (Albin Michel), 1932
- Droit et société dans la Grèce ancienne, 1955
- Anthropologie de la Grèce antique (Maspéro), 1968

Gernet also translated and commented classical Greek works.
