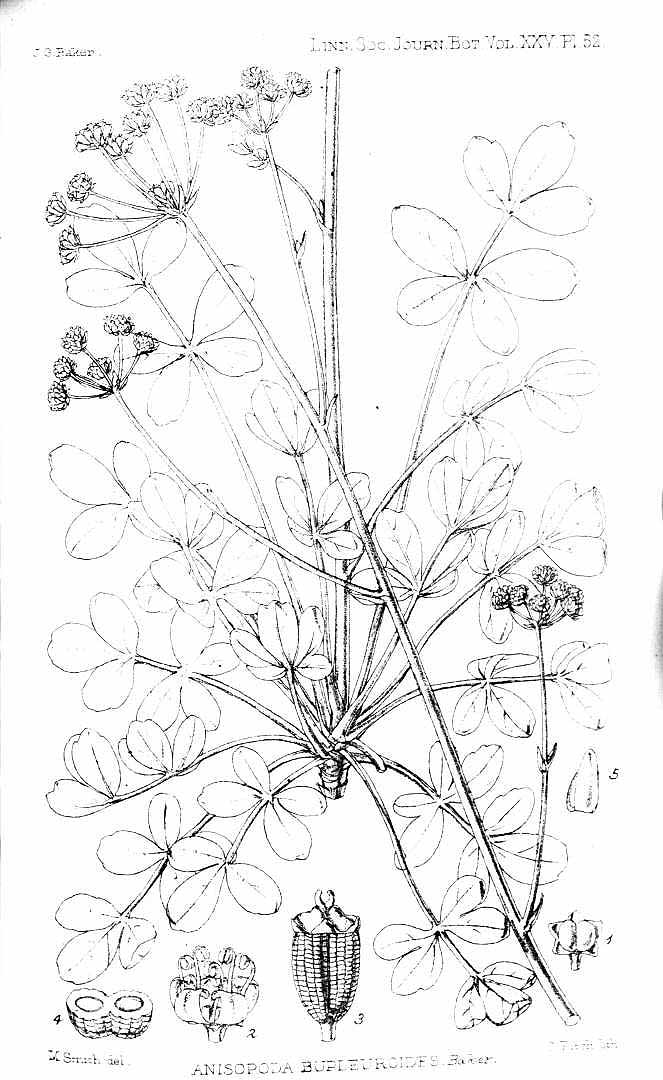
- Illustration by Matilda Smith from the original description (1890)

Scientific classification
- Kingdom: Plantae
- Clade: Tracheophytes
- Clade: Angiosperms
- Clade: Eudicots
- Clade: Asterids
- Order: Apiales
- Family: Apiaceae
- Subfamily: Apioideae
- Tribe: Heteromorpheae
- Genus: Anisopoda; Baker
- Species: A. bupleuroides

Binomial name
- Anisopoda bupleuroides Baker

= Anisopoda =

Genus of flowering plants

Anisopoda is a flowering plant genus with only one species: Anisopoda bupleuroides. The genus is in the Apiaceae and is endemic to Madagascar.

A. bupleuroides is an erect herbaceous perennial growing about 2 ft (60 cm) tall.
