= Joseph Dalton Hooker =

British botanist and explorer (1817–1911)

Sir Joseph Dalton Hooker OM GCSI CB FRS
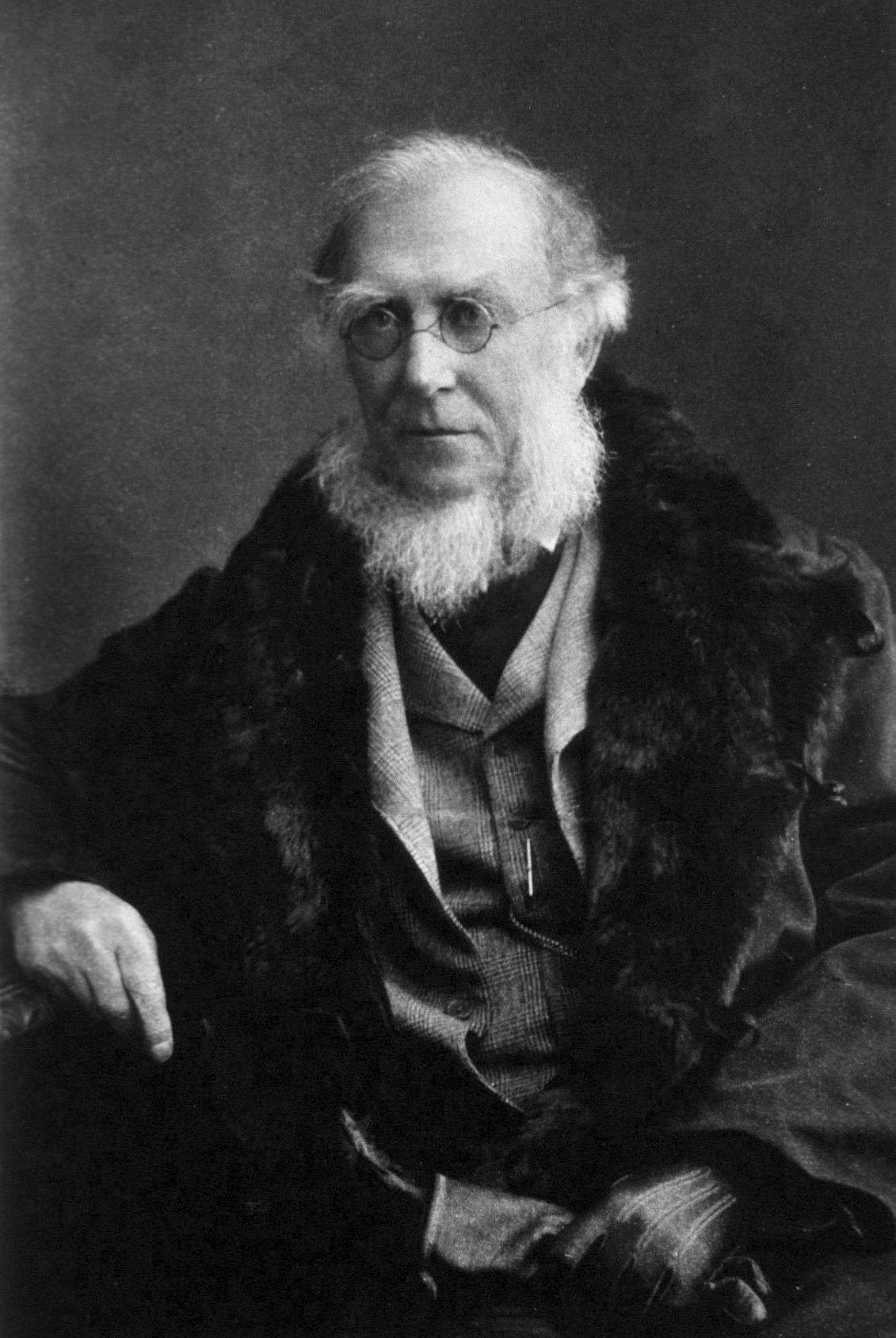
- Hooker in 1897
- Born: 30 June 1817; Halesworth, Suffolk, England
- Died: 10 December 1911 (aged 94); Sunningdale, Berkshire, England
- Education: University of Glasgow
- Spouse: Frances Harriet Henslow (m. 1851; died 1874) Hyacinth Symonds (m. 1875)
- Children: 9, including Harriet and Reginald
- Father: William Jackson Hooker
- Awards: Clarke Medal (1885); Copley Medal (1887); Linnean Medal (1888); Darwin Medal (1892); Order of Merit (1907); Darwin–Wallace Medal (1908)
- Scientific career
- Fields: Botany
- Workplaces: Kew Gardens
- Author abbrev. (botany): Hook.f.

Sir Joseph Dalton Hooker (30 June 1817 – 10 December 1911) was an English botanist and explorer in the 19th century. He was a founder of geographical botany and Charles Darwin's closest friend. For 20 years he served as director of the Royal Botanical Gardens, Kew, succeeding his father, William Jackson Hooker, and was awarded the highest honours of British science.

== Biography ==
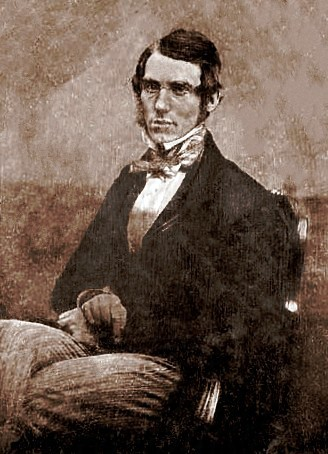
Daguerreotype of Hooker by William Edward Kilburn, circa 1852

=== Early years ===
Hooker was born in Halesworth, Suffolk, England. He was the second son of Maria Sarah Turner, eldest daughter of the banker Dawson Turner and sister-in-law of Francis Palgrave, and the famous botanist Sir William Jackson Hooker, Regius Professor of Botany. From the age of seven, Hooker attended his father's lectures at the University of Glasgow, taking an early interest in plant distribution and the voyages of explorers like Captain James Cook. He was educated at the Glasgow High School and went on to study medicine at the University of Glasgow graduating with an MD in 1839.

His degree qualified him for employment in the Naval Medical Service. He joined the polar explorer Captain James Clark Ross's Antarctic expedition to the South Magnetic Pole after receiving a commission as Assistant-Surgeon on HMS Erebus. On this expedition, Hooker was granted full access to the private library of Richard Clement Moody, then Governor of the Falkland Islands. Hooker described the library as 'excellent', and developed a close friendship with Moody.

=== Marriages and children ===
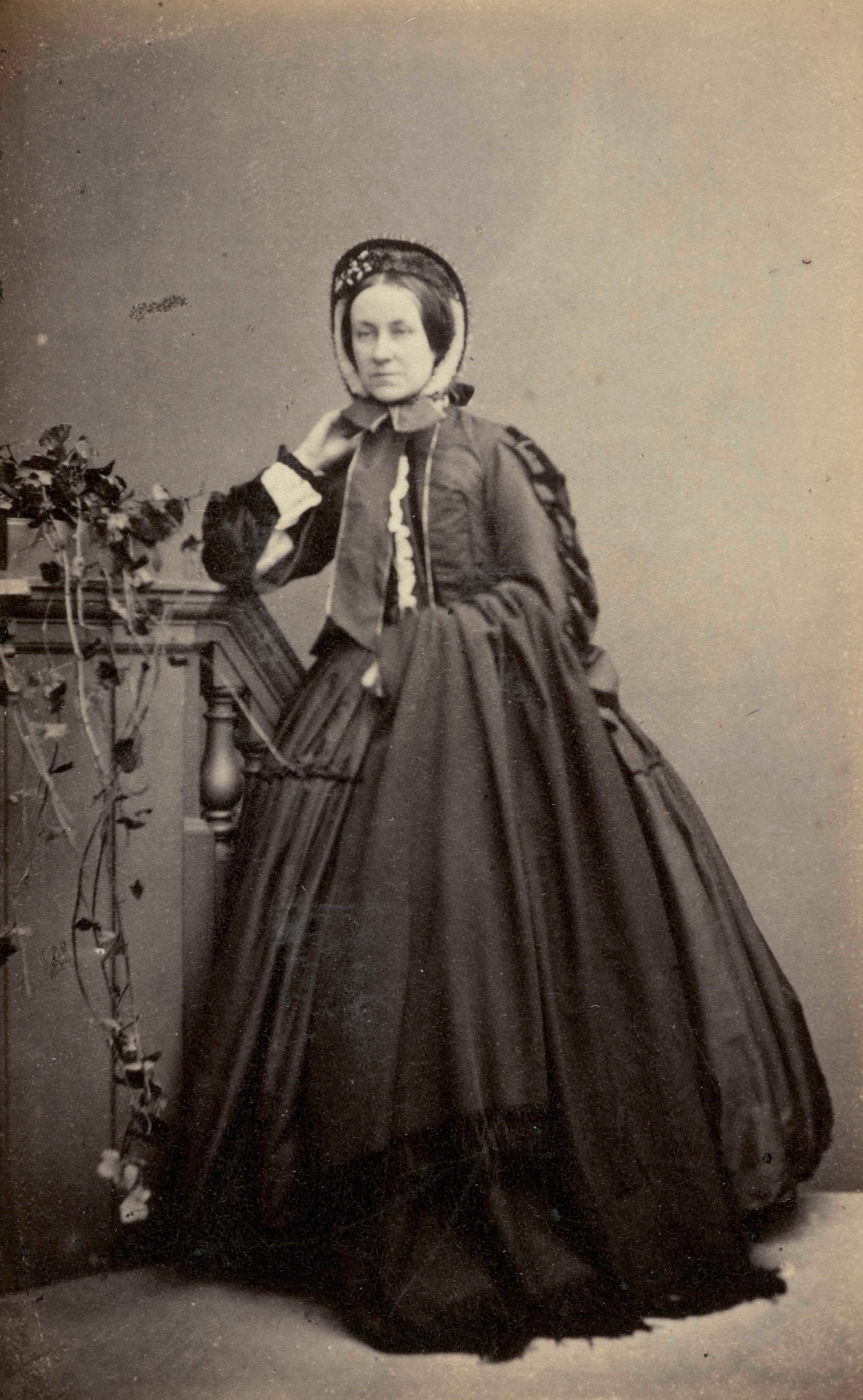
Frances Harriet Henslow, by William Edward Kilburn

In 1851, he married Frances Harriet Henslow (1825–1874), daughter of Darwin's mentor, John Stevens Henslow. They had three daughters and four sons:

- William Henslow Hooker (1853–1942)
- Harriet Anne Hooker (1854–1945) married William Turner Thiselton-Dyer
- Charles Paget Hooker (1855–1933)
- Maria Elizabeth Hooker (1857–1863) died aged 6.
- Brian Harvey Hodgson Hooker (1860–1932)
- Reginald Hawthorn Hooker (1867–1944) statistician
- Grace Ellen Hooker (1868–1955)

Frances Harriet Henslow's contribution to his work included translating French botanical texts which Hooker edited.

After his first wife's death in 1874, in 1876 he married Lady Hyacinth Jardine (1842–1921), daughter of William Samuel Symonds and the widow of Sir William Jardine. They had two sons:

- Joseph Symonds Hooker (1877–1940)
- Richard Symonds Hooker (1885–1950).

Lady Hooker was elected a Fellow of the RSPB in 1905.

=== Sons Willy and Brian ===
Hooker regularly corresponded with the chief government scientist in New Zealand, Sir James Hector. He sent his son Willy (aged 15) to stay in New Zealand with the recently married Hector in 1869, Willy was sickly and coughing up blood, and a warmer climate was recommended. Though well-behaved he was indolent. Hector sent him on a cruise on a Government steamer the Sturt with a son (also 15) of Colonel Haultain the Defence minister. Mrs Hector treated him like a younger brother. After eight months and in better health Hector sent him home to England, saying he had greatly improved. His father was grateful, and surprised when Willy passed the civil service examination. He got an administrative job in the India Office, and lived to age 89.

However, his third son, Brian, was a "great worry" to him. He qualified as a geologist and mining engineer at the Royal School of Mines but unable to get a job in Britain emigrated to Australia, where he married. He resigned a Queensland lectureship to invest (with his brother Willy) in an impressively named but cash-strapped gold-mining company which collapsed, the Queensland Minerals Exploration Company. Joseph was appalled; Brian could not support his wife and children or find employment.

In 1891, Hector sent a pessimistic report on a proposed tin mine on Stewart Island, and saw Brian in 1892 and 1893, after he left his family in Australia. Hector ceased to be involved with mining in New Zealand under the new Liberal government. Brian returned to his family in Australia in 1894.

=== Death and burial ===
On 10 December 1911, after a short and apparently minor illness, Hooker died in his sleep at home, the Camp, Sunningdale, Berkshire. The Dean and Chapter of Westminster Abbey offered a grave near Darwin's in the nave but insisted that Hooker be cremated before.

His widow, Hyacinth, declined the proposal and eventually Hooker's body was buried, as he wished to be, alongside his father in the churchyard of St Anne's Church, Kew, a short distance from Kew Gardens. His memorial tablet in the church, with a motif of five plants, was designed by Matilda Smith.

== Work ==
=== Voyage to the Antarctic 1839–1843 ===
Hooker's first expedition, led by James Clark Ross, consisted of two ships, HMS Erebus and HMS Terror; it was the last major voyage of exploration made entirely under sail. Hooker was the youngest of the 128-man crew. He sailed on the Erebus and was assistant to Robert McCormick, who in addition to being the ship's Surgeon was instructed to collect zoological and geological specimens. The ships sailed on 30 September 1839. Before journeying to Antarctica they visited Madeira, Tenerife, Santiago and Quail Island in the Cape Verde archipelago, St Paul Rocks, Trindade east of Brazil, St Helena, and the Cape of Good Hope. Hooker made plant collections at each location and while travelling drew these and specimens of algae and sea life pulled aboard using tow nets.

From the Cape they entered the Southern Ocean. Their first stop was the Crozet Islands where they set down on Possession Island to deliver coffee to sealers. They departed for the Kerguelen Islands where they would spend several days. Hooker identified 18 flowering plants, 35 mosses and liverworts, 25 lichens and 51 algae, including some that were not described by surgeon William Anderson when James Cook had visited the islands in 1772. The expedition spent some time in Hobart, Van Diemen's Land, and then moved on to the Auckland Islands and Campbell Island, and onward to Antarctica to locate the South Magnetic Pole. After spending 5 months in the Antarctic they returned to resupply in Hobart, then went on to Sydney, and the Bay of Islands in New Zealand from 18 August to 23 November 1841. They left New Zealand to return to Antarctica. After spending 138 days at sea, and a collision between the Erebus and Terror, they sailed to the Falkland Islands, to Tierra del Fuego, back to the Falklands and onward to their third sortie into the Antarctic. When Hooker arrived on the Falkland Islands with the expedition of Ross, he developed a close friendship with Richard Clement Moody, the Governor of the Falkland Islands. Moody granted Hooker full use of his personal library, which Hooker described as 'excellent', and Hooker described Moody as 'a very active and intelligent young man, most anxious to improve the colony and gain every information [sic] respecting its products'.

Subsequently, the Ross expedition made a landing at Cockburn Island off the Antarctic Peninsula, and after leaving the Antarctic, stopped at the Cape, St Helena and Ascension Island. The ships arrived back in England on 4 September 1843; the voyage had been a success for Ross as it was the first to confirm the existence of the southern continent and chart much of its coastline.

=== Geological Survey of Great Britain ===
In 1845, Hooker applied for the Chair of Botany at the University of Edinburgh. This position included duties at the Royal Botanic Gardens of Scotland, and so the appointment was influenced by local politicians. An unusually protracted struggle ensued, resulting in the election of the locally born and bred botanist, John Hutton Balfour. The Darwin correspondence, now public, makes clear Darwin's sense of shock at this unexpected outcome. Hooker declined a chair at Glasgow University which became vacant on Balfour's appointment. Instead, he took a position as botanist to the Geological Survey of Great Britain in 1846. He began work on palaeobotany, searching for fossil plants in the coal-beds of Wales, eventually discovering the first coal ball in 1855. He became engaged to Frances Henslow, daughter of Charles Darwin's botany tutor John Stevens Henslow, but he was keen to continue to travel and gain more experience in the field. He wanted to travel to India and the Himalayas. In 1847 his father nominated him to travel to India and collect plants for Kew. In 2011, a collection of glass plate slides of paleontological fossils, some prepared by Darwin, William Nicol and others, which had been lost following Hooker's brief tenure with the Survey, were rediscovered in the Survey vaults in Keyworth in Nottinghamshire, and they shed light on the international breadth of English scientific research in the first half of the nineteenth century.

=== Voyage to the Himalayas and India 1847–1851 ===
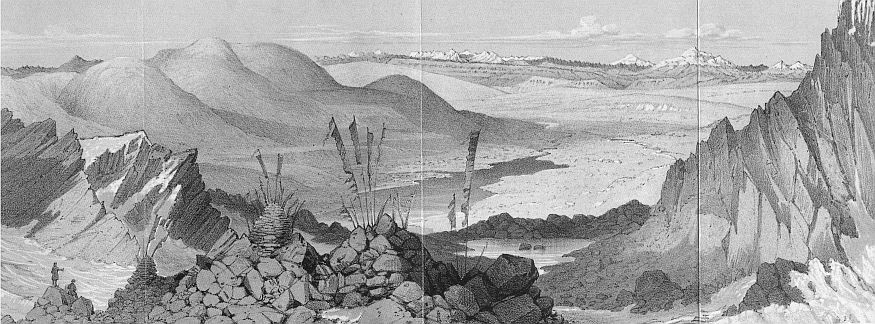
Tibet and Cholamo Lake from the summit of the Donkia Pass, looking North West from Hooker's Himalayan Journals. Hooker reached the pass on 7 November 1849.

On 11 November 1847 Hooker left England for his three-year-long Himalayan expedition. This was just 10 days after being granted two and a half years' leave from the Geological Survey to study fossil plants in India and Borneo on behalf of Kew and the Admiralty. He would be the first European to collect plants in the Himalaya, but abandoned the projected visit to Labuan. He received free passage on HMS Sidon, to the Nile and then travelled overland to Suez where he boarded a ship to India. He arrived in Calcutta on 12 January 1848, leaving on 28th to begin his travels with a geological survey party under 'Mr Williams', who he left on 3 March to continue travelling by elephant to Mirzapur, up the Ganges by boat to Siliguri and overland by pony to Darjeeling, arriving on 16 April 1848.

Hooker's expedition was based in Darjeeling where he stayed with naturalist Brian Houghton Hodgson. Through Hodgson he met British East India Company representative Archibald Campbell who negotiated Hooker's admission to Sikkim, which was finally approved in 1849 (He was later briefly taken prisoner by the Raja of Sikkim). Meanwhile, Hooker wrote to Darwin relaying to him the habits of animals in India, and collected plants in Bengal. He explored with local resident Charles Barnes, then travelled along the Great Runjeet river to its junction with the Teesta River and Tonglu mountain in the Singalila range on the border with Nepal.

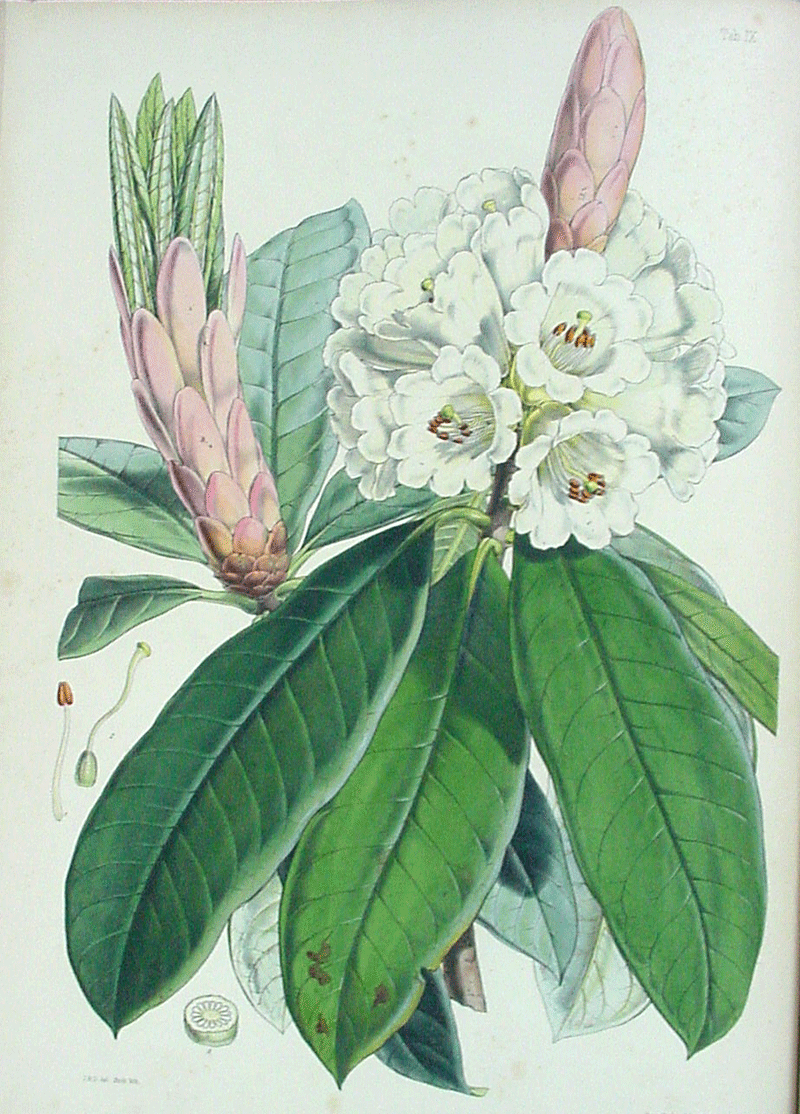
Rhododendron argenteum illustration by Walter Hood Fitch from Rhododendrons of Sikkim Himalaya.

Hooker and a sizeable party of local assistants departed for eastern Nepal on 27 October 1848. They travelled to Zongri, west over the spurs of Kangchenjunga, and north west along Nepal's passes into Tibet. In April 1849 he planned a longer expedition into Sikkim. Leaving on 3 May, he travelled north west up the Lachen Valley to the Kongra Lama Pass and then to the Lachoong Pass. Campbell and Hooker were imprisoned by the Dewan of Sikkim as they travelled towards the Cho La in Tibet. A British team was sent to negotiate with the king of Sikkim. However, they were released without any bloodshed and Hooker returned to Darjeeling, where he spent January and February 1850 writing his journals, replacing specimens lost during his detention and planning a journey for his last year in India. According to an 1887 journal written by Indian administrator Richard Temple, many of the rhododendrons found in English gardens of the time were grown from seeds collected by Hooker in Sikkim.

Reluctant to return to Sikkim, and unenthusiastic about travelling in Bhutan, he chose to make his last Himalayan expedition to Sylhet and the Khasi Hills in Assam. He was accompanied by Thomas Thomson, a fellow student from Glasgow University. They left Darjeeling on 1 May 1850, then sailed to the Bay of Bengal and travelled overland by elephant to the Khasi Hills and established a headquarters for their studies in Churra, where they stayed until 9 December, when they began their trip back to England. With Thomson he distributed the exsiccata-like series Herbarium Indiae orientalis.

Hooker's survey of hitherto unexplored regions, the Himalayan Journals, dedicated to Charles Darwin, was published by the Calcutta Trigonometrical Survey Office in 1854, abbreviated again in 1855 and later by the Minerva Library of Famous Books published by Ward, Lock, Bowden & Co. in 1891.

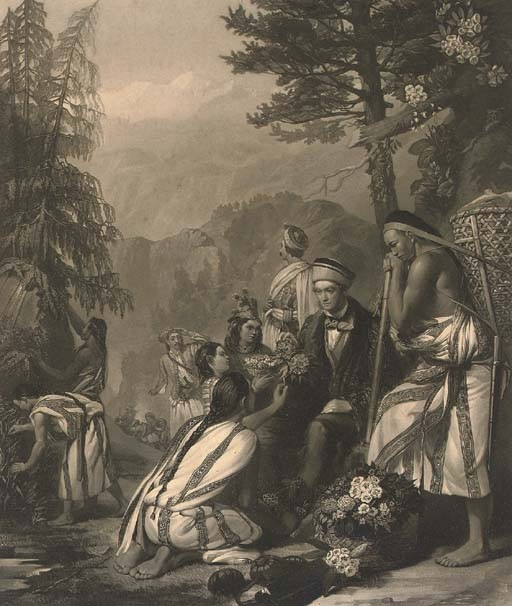
An 1854 illustration showing Hooker with his Lepcha collectors in Sikkim (Mezzotint by William Walker after a painting by Frank Stone)

When Hooker returned to England his father, who had been appointed director of the Royal Botanic Gardens, Kew in 1841, was now a prominent man of science. William Hooker, through his connections, secured an Admiralty grant of £1000 to defray the cost of plates for his son's Botany of the Antarctic Voyages, and an annual stipend of £200 for Joseph while he worked on the flora. Hooker's flora was also to include that collected on the voyages of Cook and Menzies held by the British Museum and collections made on the Beagle. The floras were illustrated by Walter Hood Fitch (trained in botanical illustration by William Hooker), who would go on to become the most prolific Victorian botanical artist.

Hooker's collections from the Antarctic voyage were described eventually in one of two volumes published as the Flora Antarctica (1844–47). In the Flora he wrote about islands and their role in plant geography: the work made Hooker's reputation as a systemist and plant geographer. His works on the voyage were completed with Flora Novae-Zelandiae (1851–53) and Flora Tasmaniae (1853–59).

=== Voyage to Palestine 1860 ===
This trip was taken in the autumn of 1860, with Daniel Hanbury. They visited and collected in Syria and Palestine; no full-length report was published, but a number of papers were written. Hooker recognised three phytogeographical divisions: Western Syria and Palestine; Eastern Syria and Palestine; Middle and Upper mountain regions of Syria.

=== Voyage to Morocco 1871 ===
Hooker visited Morocco from April to June 1871, in the company of John Ball, George Maw and a young gardener from Kew, called Crump. They published an account of their travels entitled Journal of a Tour in Marocco and The Great Atlas (1878).

=== Voyage to Western United States 1877 ===
This was undertaken with his friend Asa Gray, the leading American botanist of the day. They wished to investigate the connection between the floras of eastern United States and those of eastern continental Asia and Japan; and the line of demarcation between Arctic floras of America and Greenland. As probable causes they considered the Glacial periods and an earlier land connection with an Arctic continent. "A difficult question was why in the great mountain chains of the Western United States there appeared to be only a few botanical enclaves of plants of eastern-Asiatic afinities among plants of Mexican and more southern types."

Hooker visited a number of cities and botanical institutions before moving west and climbing to 9,000 ft to camp at La Veta. From Fort Garland they climbed the Sierra Blanca at 14,500 ft. After returning to La Veta, they went beyond Colorado Springs to Pike's Peak. Next to Denver and Salt Lake City for an excursion into the Wasatch Range. A journey of 29 hours took them to Reno and Carson City, then Silver City and ten days by wagon across the Sierra Nevada. Thus they came to the Yosemite and Calaveras Grove, and ended up in San Francisco. Hooker was back in Kew with 1,000 dried specimens by October.

His comments on his encounters include the following:

- After meeting and talking to Brigham Young, whom he described as respectable and well-spoken: "All the school children are brought up to believe in him [Brigham Young], and in a lot of scripture history as useless and idle as that taught in our schools."
- Of Georgetown: the "finger-tip of civilisation" where "the people sleep without locks to their doors, the fire-engines are well-manned and in capital order, and there is no end of food".
- "The New Englanders are most like us in language, speech and habits... The Americans are great and promiscuous eaters... beds are remarkably clean and good, but the pillows are too soft."

His views on the flora of Colorado and Utah: There are two temperate, and two cold or mountain floras, viz: 1. a prairie flora derived from the eastward; 2. a so-called desert and saline flora derived from the west; 3. a sub-alpine; 4. an alpine flora, the two latter of widely different origin, and in one sense proper to the Rocky Mountain ranges.

His overview of North American flora contained these elements:

Polar area, from the Behring Strait to Greenland.
British North American flora, south of the Arctic flora, in five meridional belts.
United States flora, in belts:

The Great Eastern Forest region, from the Atlantic to beyond the Mississippi.
The Prairie region.
The Sink region, confined to gullies of the mountains.
The Sierra Nevada.

=== Darwin and evolution ===
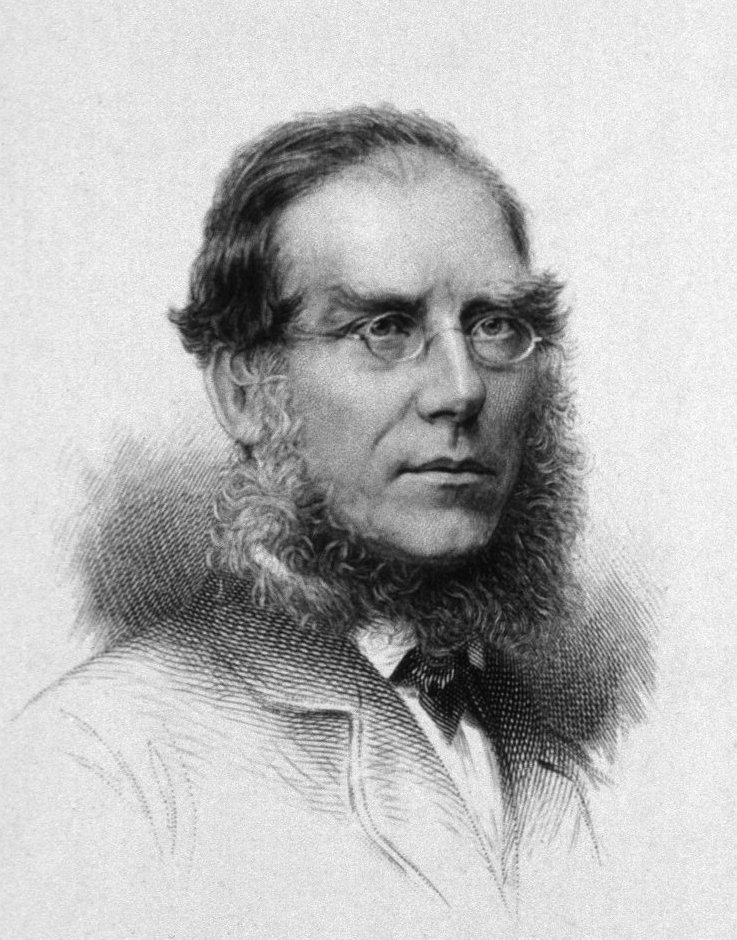
Engraving of Hooker by Charles Henry Jeens (1827–1879)

While on the Erebus, Hooker had read proofs of Charles Darwin's Voyage of the Beagle provided by Charles Lyell and had been very impressed by Darwin's skill as a naturalist. They had met once, before the Antarctic voyage embarked. (Note: Hooker had met Darwin for the first time before leaving on the Erebus. Apparently, they met in Trafalgar Square, but without quoting source). The voyages of HMS Beagle and HMS Erebus (and Terror) coincided at several points; for example, they both visited the Falkland Isles, Australia (Sydney, at least), and New Zealand.) After Hooker's return to England, he was approached by Darwin who invited him to classify the plants that Darwin had collected in South America and the Galápagos Islands. Hooker agreed and the pair began a lifelong friendship. On 11 January 1844 Darwin mentioned to Hooker his early ideas on the transmutation of species and natural selection, and Hooker showed interest. In 1847 he agreed to read Darwin's "Essay" explaining the theory, and responded with notes giving Darwin calm critical feedback. Their correspondence continued throughout the development of Darwin's theory and in 1858 Darwin wrote that Hooker was "the one living soul from whom I have constantly received sympathy".

Freeman 1978 wrote "Hooker was Charles Darwin's greatest friend and confidant". Certainly they had extensive correspondence, and they also met face-to-face (Hooker visiting Darwin). Hooker and Lyell were the two people Darwin consulted (by letter) when Alfred Russel Wallace's famous letter arrived at Down House, enclosing his paper on natural selection. Hooker was instrumental in creating the device whereby the Wallace paper was accompanied by Darwin's notes and his letter to Asa Gray (showing his prior realisation of natural selection) in a presentation to the Linnean Society. Hooker was the one who formally presented this material to the Linnean Society meeting in 1858. In 1859 the author of The Origin of Species recorded his indebtedness to Hooker's wide knowledge and balanced judgment.

In December 1859, Hooker published the Introductory Essay to the Flora Tasmaniae, the final part of the Botany of the Antarctic Voyage. It was in this essay (which appeared just one month after the publication of Charles Darwin's On the Origin of Species), that Hooker announced his support for the theory of evolution by natural selection, thus becoming the first recognised man of science to publicly back Darwin.

At the historic debate on evolution held at the Oxford University Museum on 30 June 1860, Bishop Samuel Wilberforce, Benjamin Brodie and Robert FitzRoy spoke against Darwin's theory, and Hooker and Thomas Henry Huxley defended it. According to Hooker's own account, it was he and not Huxley who delivered the most effective reply to Wilberforce's arguments.

Hooker acted as president of the British Association at its Norwich meeting of 1868, when his address was remarkable for its championship of Darwinian theories. He was a close friend of Thomas Henry Huxley, a member of the X-Club (which dominated the Royal Society in the 1870s and early 1880s), and the first of the three X-Clubbers in succession to become President of the Royal Society. In 1862, he was elected a foreign member of the Royal Swedish Academy of Sciences.

=== Royal Botanic Gardens, Kew ===
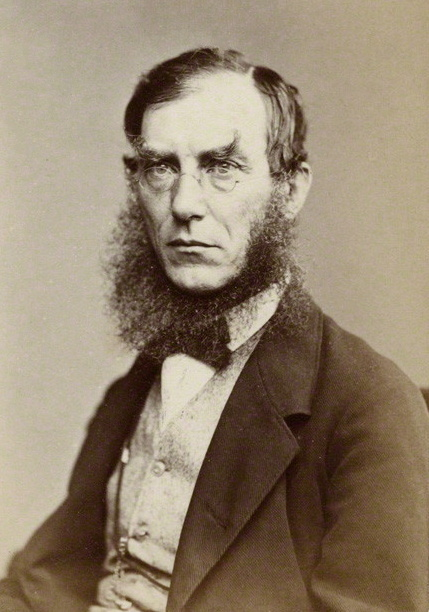
Hooker in the 1860s during his period at Kew

By his travels and his publications, Hooker built up a high scientific reputation at home. In 1855 he was appointed Assistant-Director of the Royal Botanic Gardens, Kew, and in 1865 he succeeded his father as full Director, holding the post for twenty years. Under the directorship of father and son Hooker, the Royal Botanic gardens of Kew rose to world renown. At the age of thirty, Hooker was elected a fellow of the Royal Society, and in 1873 he was chosen its president (till 1877). He received three of its medals: the Royal Medal in 1854, the Copley in 1887 and the Darwin Medal in 1892. He continued to intersperse work at Kew with foreign exploration and collecting. His journeys to Palestine, Morocco and the United States all produced valuable information and specimens for Kew.

He started the series Flora Indica in 1855, together with Thomas Thompson. Their botanical observations and the publication of the Rhododendrons of Sikkim–Himalaya (1849–51), formed the basis of elaborate works on the rhododendrons of the Sikkim Himalaya and on the flora of India. His works were illustrated with lithographs by Walter Hood Fitch.

His greatest botanical work was the Flora of British India, published in seven volumes starting in 1872. On the publication of the last part in 1897, he was promoted Knight Grand Commander of the Order of the Star of India (being made a Knight Commander of that Order in 1877). Ten years later, on attaining the age of ninety in 1907, he was awarded the Order of Merit.

He was the author of numerous scientific papers and monographs, and his larger books included, in addition to those already mentioned, a standard Students Flora of the British Isles and a monumental work, the Genera plantarum (1860–83), based on the collections at Kew, in which he had the assistance of George Bentham. His collaboration with George Bentham was especially important. Bentham, an amateur botanist who worked at Kew for many years, was perhaps the leading botanical systematist of the 19th century. The Handbook of the British flora, begun by Bentham and completed by Hooker, was the standard text for a hundred years. It was always known as 'Bentham & Hooker'.

In 1904, at the age of 87, Hooker published A sketch of the Vegetation of the Indian Empire. He continued the compilation of his father Sir William Jackson Hooker's project, Icones Plantarum (Illustrations of Plants), producing volumes eleven through nineteen, with most of the illustrations being prepared for him by Matilda Smith.

==== Attacks on Hooker and on Kew ====
The Herbarium at Kew was founded in 1853, and quickly grew in size and importance. At the time, Richard Owen was the Superintendent of the natural history departments of the British Museum, reporting only to the Head of the British Museum. Hooker, appointed in 1855 as Assistant Director of Kew, was the man most responsible for bringing foreign specimens to Kew.

There is no doubt that rivalry resulted between the British Museum, where there was the very important Herbarium of the Department of Botany, and Kew. The rivalry at times became extremely personal, especially between Joseph Hooker and Owen. ... At the root was Owen's feeling that Kew should be subordinate to the British Museum (and to Owen) and should not be allowed to develop as an independent scientific institution with the advantage of a great botanic garden. (Note: Turrill 1963, p. 90 This rivalry between the two institutions is even more important than the characters of the two men. Owen's character was widely traduced after his treatment of Gideon Mantell, and Hooker was "impulsive and somewhat peppery in temper".)

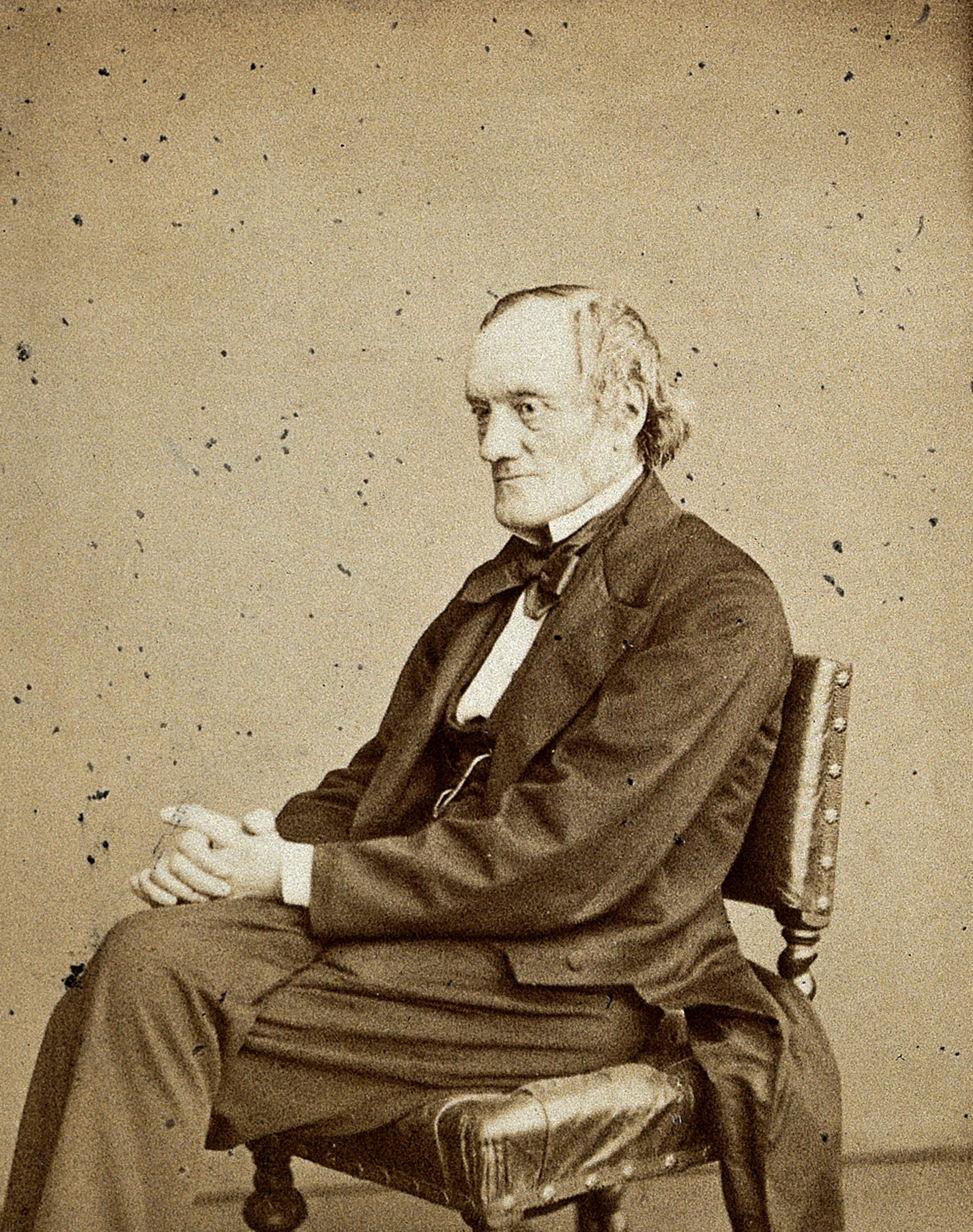
Sir Richard Owen opposed Hooker in his planned expansion of Kew Photograph: Ernest Edwards, 1867

The relationship between the two men continued to deteriorate after Hooker became a supporter of Darwin's views and a member of the X-Club, who set out to get their way with the Royal Society. In 1868 Hooker had proposed that the whole of the huge herbarium collection of Joseph Banks should be moved from the British Museum to Kew, a reasonable idea, but a threat to Owen's plans for a museum in South Kensington to house the natural history collections. Hooker cited mismanagement at the British Museum as a justification.

After Joseph had succeeded his father as Director, in 1865, the independence of Kew was seriously threatened by the machinations of a member of parliament, Acton Smee Ayrton, whose appointment as First Commissioner of Works by Gladstone in 1869 was greeted in The Times with the prophecy that it would prove "another instance of Mr. Ayrton's unfortunate tendency to carry out what he thinks right in as unpleasant a manner as possible". This was relevant because Kew was funded by the Board of Works, and the Director of Kew reported to the First Commissioner. The conflict between the two men lasted from 1870 to 1872, and there is a voluminous correspondence on the Ayrton Episode held at Kew.

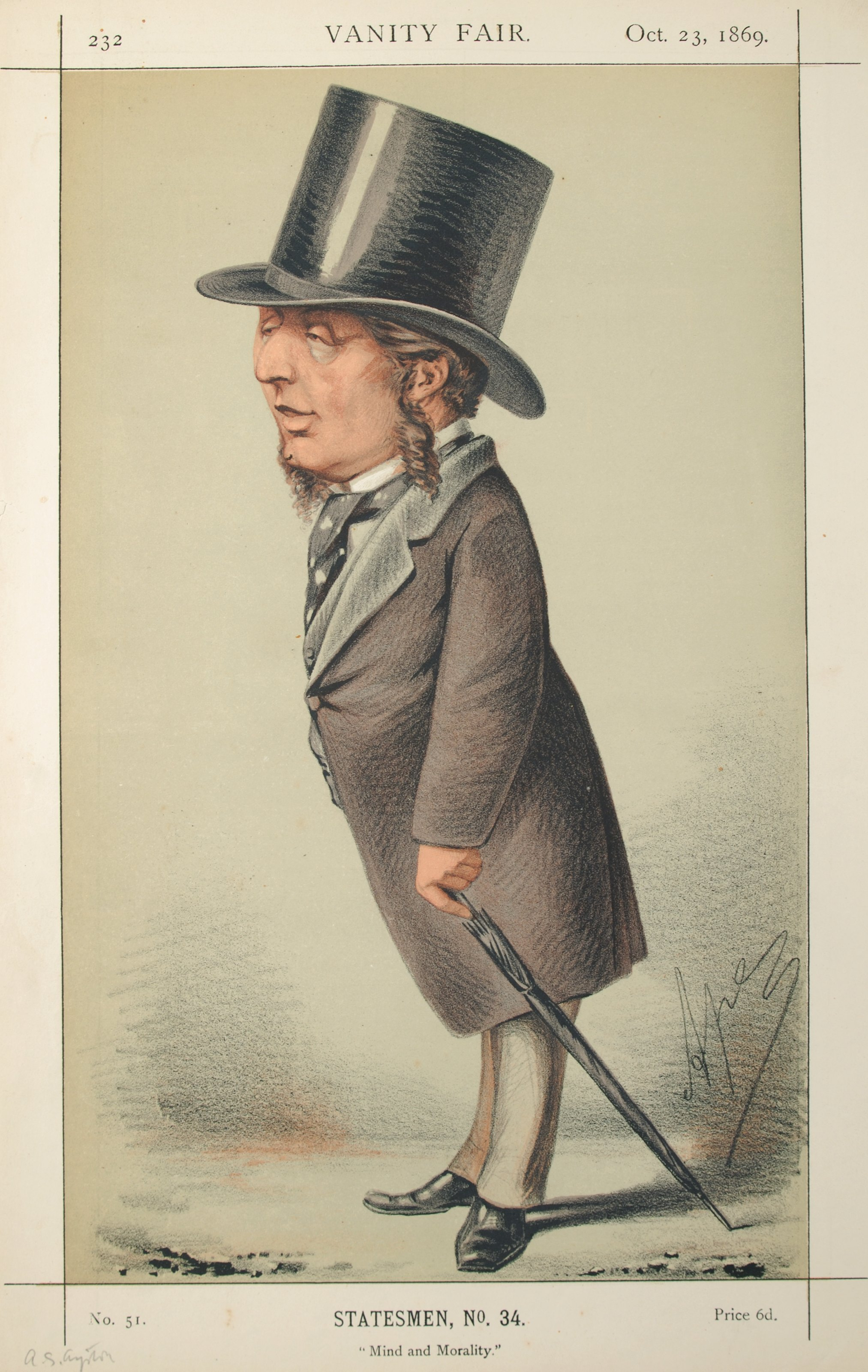
Owen was supported in parliament by Acton Smee Ayrton Caracature, Vanity Fair, 1869

Ayrton behaved in an extraordinary way, interfering in matters and approaching Hooker's colleagues behind his back, apparently with the aim of getting Hooker to resign, when the expenditure on Kew could be curtailed and diverted. Ayrton actually took staff appointments out of Hooker's hands. He seemed not to value the scientific work, and to believe Kew should be just an amusement park. Hooker wrote:

My life has become utterly detestable and I do long to throw up the Directorship. What can be more humiliating than two years of wrangling with such a creature!

— Hooker to Bentham, 2 February 1872, in Huxley 1918, p. 165, Chapter XXXV The Ayrton Episode

Finally, Hooker asked to be put in communication with Gladstone's private secretary, Algernon West. A statement was drawn up over the signatures of Darwin, Lyell, Huxley, Tyndall, Bentham and others. It was laid before Parliament by John Lubbock, and additional papers laid before the House of Lords. Lord Derby called for all the correspondence on the matter. The Treasury supported Hooker and criticised Ayrton's behaviour. (Note: An important Treasury Minute, dated 24 July, admits the justice of Dr. Hooker's remonstrance. It was very plain speaking to say that "the Lords of the Treasury are not surprised that in various cases Dr. Hooker should have thought that he had just cause of complaint", and "they direct so decidedly that in all matters connected with the scientific branch of the Gardens Dr. Hooker's opinion should be followed, subject only to the consideration of expense, and lay down so distinctly his right to be consulted in all matters relating to the management of the establishment".)

One extraordinary fact emerged. There had been an official report on Kew, which had not previously been seen in public, which Ayrton had caused to be written by Richard Owen. Hooker had not seen the report, and so had not been given right of reply. Nonetheless, the report was amongst the papers laid before Parliament, and it contained an attack on both the Hookers, and suggested (amongst much else) that they had mismanaged the care of their trees, and that their systematic approach to botany was nothing more than "attaching barbarous binomials to foreign weeds". (Note: Turrill 1963, p. 90 Richard Owen was Ayrton's main supporter, and "attacked Hooker right and left". No doubt he remembered Hooker's 1868 proposal to seize the Banks herbarium.) The discovery of this report no doubt helped to sway opinion in favour of Hooker and Kew (there was debate in the press as well as Parliament). Hooker replied to the Owen report in a point by point factual manner, and his reply was placed with the other papers on the case. When Ayrton was questioned about it in the debate led by Lubbock, he replied that "Hooker was too low an official to raise questions of matter with a Minister of the Crown".

The outcome was not a vote in the Commons, but a kind of truce until, in August 1874, Gladstone transferred Ayrton from the Board of Works to the office of Judge Advocate-General, just before his government fell. Ayrton failed to get re-elected to Parliament. From that moment to this, the value of the Botanic Gardens has never been seriously questioned. In the midst of this crisis, Hooker was elected as President of the Royal Society in 1873. This showed publicly the high regard which Hooker's fellow scientists had for him, and the great importance they attached to his work.

== Honours and commemoration ==
- 1847 Fellow of the Royal Society
- 1869 Companion of the Order of the Bath
- 1869 Election to the American Philosophical Society
- 1877 Knight Commander of the Order of the Star of India
- 1873 President of the Royal Society
- 1883 Founder's Medal of the Royal Geographical Society
- 1885 Foreign member of the Royal Netherlands Academy of Arts and Sciences
- 1892 Honorary membership of the Manchester Literary and Philosophical Society
- 1897 Knight Grand Commander of the Order of the Star of India
- 1902 Pour le Mérite from the Kingdom of Prussia, awarded by the German Emperor
- 1907 Order of Merit

Hooker Oak in Chico, California, was named after him. Hooker Island in Franz Josef Land was named after him following its 1880 discovery.

=== Taxa named in honour ===
- There are number (at least 30) of plants with specific name hookeri and hookeriana. Many of them are named in honour of Joseph Dalton Hooker, including Banksia hookeriana, Grevillea hookeriana, Iris hookeriana, Polygonatum hookeri, Tainia hookeriana and Sarcococca hookeriana.
- Land snail Notodiscus hookeri (Reeve, 1854)
- Sea Lion: New Zealand or Hooker's Sea Lion Phocarctos hookeri (Gray, 1844)

== Selected publications ==
- 1844–1859: Flora Antarctica: the botany of the Antarctic voyage. 3 vols, 1844 (general), 1853 (New Zealand), 1859 (Tasmania). Reeve, London.
- 1864–1867: Handbook of the New Zealand flora
- 1849: Niger flora
- 1849–1851: The Rhododendrons of Sikkim–Himalaya
- 1854: Himalayan Journals, or notes of a naturalist, in Bengal, the Sikkim and Nepal Himalayas, Khasia Mountains ...
- 1855: Illustrations of Himalayan plants
- 1855: Flora indica, with Thomas Thomson
- 1858: Handbook of the British Flora: A Description of the Flowering Plants and Ferns Indigenous To, Or Naturalized In, the British Isles : for the Use of Beginners and Amateurs. L. Reeve. 1858. ("Bentham & Hooker")
- 1859: A century of Indian orchids
- 1859: Introductory Essay to the Flora of Australia
- 1862–1883: Genera plantarum ad exemplaria imprimis in herbariis kewensibus servata definita. Vol. Primum, Sistens Dicotyledonum Polypetalarum Ordines LXXXIII: Ranunculareas—Cornaceas. London: Reeve & Co. 1867. with George Bentham
- 1862–1883: Genera plantarum ad exemplaria imprimis in Herbariis kewensibus servata definita Vol. Secundi (in Latin). London: Reeve & Company. 1876. with George Bentham
- 1870; 1878: The student's flora of the British Isles. Macmillan, London.
- 1872–1897: The Flora of British India: Volume V, Chenopodiaceæ to Orchideæ. London: L. Reeve & Co. 1980 [1890]. ISBN 0-913196-29-0.
- A General System of Botany, Descriptive and Analytical in two parts [Traité général de botanique]. trans. Frances Harriet Hooker. London: Longmans Green. 1873 [1867]. with Emmanuel Le Maout
- 1878: Journal of a Tour in Marocco and The Great Atlas. Macmillan, London. with John Ball
- 1898–1900: Handbook to the Ceylon flora
- 1904–1906: An epitome to the British Indian species of Impatiens

== See also ==
- Bentham & Hooker system
- European and American voyages of scientific exploration
- Category:Taxa named by Joseph Dalton Hooker

Professional and academic associations
Preceded by George Biddell Airy	32nd President of the Royal Society; 1878–1883	Succeeded by William Spottiswoode

Awards and achievements
Preceded by Charles Robert Darwin	Royal Medal; 1854	Succeeded by John Obadiah Westwood
Preceded by Alfred Russel Wallace	Darwin Medal; 1892	Succeeded by Thomas Henry Huxley
Preceded by Alfred Richard Cecil Selwyn	Clarke Medal; 1885	Succeeded by Laurent-Guillaume de Koninck
