= Matilda Smith =

British botanical illustrator (1854–1926)

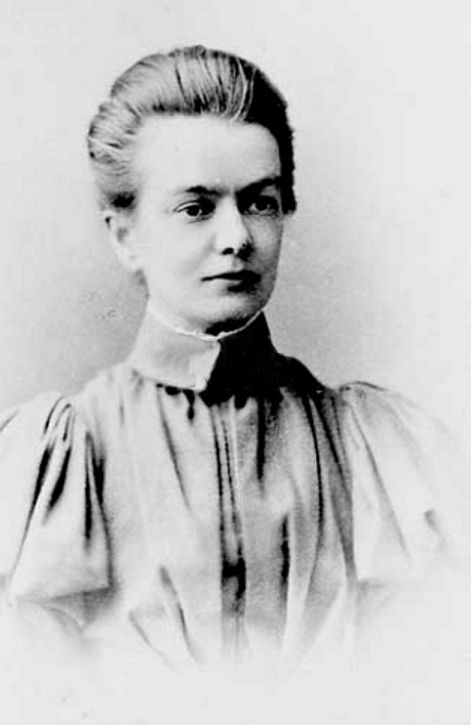
- Born: 30 July 1854; Bombay, Bombay Province, British Empire
- Died: 29 December 1926 (aged 72); London, England, United Kingdom
- Known for: Botanical illustration
- Awards: Silver Veitch Memorial Medal of the Royal Horticultural Society
- Elected: Linnaean Society

Matilda Smith (30 July 1854 – 29 December 1926) was a botanical artist whose work appeared in Curtis's Botanical Magazine for over forty years. She became the first artist to depict New Zealand's flora in depth, the first official artist of the Royal Botanic Gardens at Kew, and the second woman to become an associate of the Linnaean Society. The standard author abbreviation M.Sm. is used to indicate this person as the author when citing a botanical name.

== Biography ==
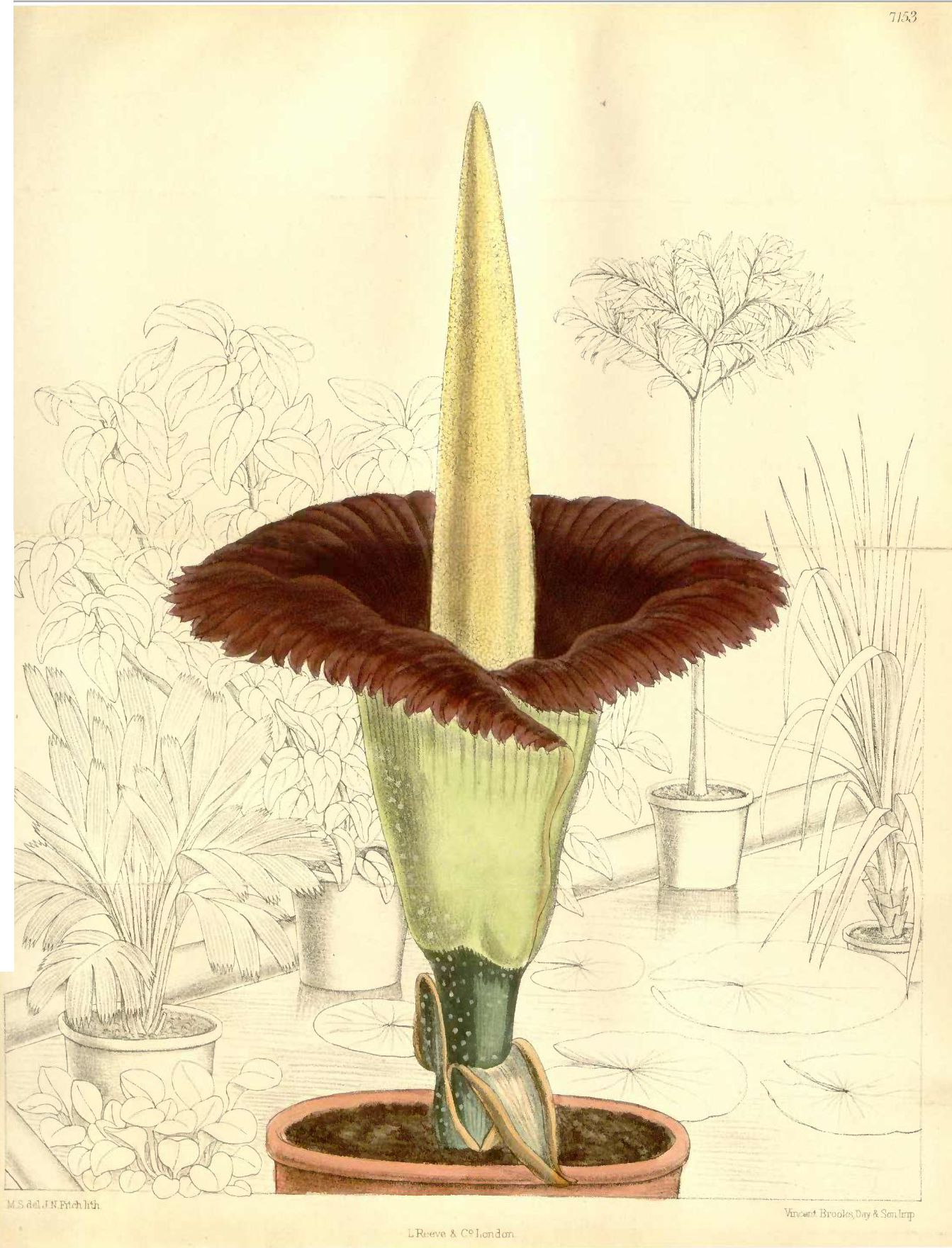
Corpse flower, Amorphophallus titanum by Matilda Smith. Plate from Curtis's Botanical Magazine, 1891. Smith drew this plant during its first blooming at Kew Gardens in 1889.

Matilda Smith was born in Bombay, India, on 30 July 1854, but her family emigrated to England when she was a small child. Her interests in botany and botanical art were fostered by her second cousin Joseph Dalton Hooker, whose daughter Harriet would also go on to become a botanical illustrator. Hooker was then the director of Kew Gardens and a talented draughtsman in his own right, and he brought Smith into the Gardens to train as an illustrator.

Smith especially admired the work of Walter Hood Fitch, who was then the lead artist for Curtis's Botanical Magazine. Despite her limited artistic training, Hooker encouraged her to show the magazine her own work, and in 1878 it first published one of her drawings. A dispute over pay between Fitch and Hooker—for whom Fitch had been preparing illustrations for several books—led to Fitch's leaving the long-running magazine in 1877. One consequence was that Smith rapidly became a key illustrator at the magazine, at first working alongside Harriet Anne Thiselton-Dyer. In the period 1879–1881, each issue included some 20 of her drawings, and, by 1887, she was almost the sole illustrator for the magazine. In 1898, she was appointed the magazine's sole official artist.

Over the forty-odd years between 1878 and 1923, Smith drew more than 2,300 plates for the magazine—only 600 fewer than Fitch, although she received much less recognition for this achievement in her own lifetime. As late as the mid 20th century, art teacher Wilfrid Blunt, in his book The Art of Botanical Illustration, dismissed her as an artist of inferior skills, praising her faintly for her charm, her work ethic, and her usefulness in creating a record of otherwise unpictured plants. In this he follows a pattern first noticeable in the Victorian era of progressively devaluing botany and botanical art as women entered the field professionally. Other authors, however, both now and in her own day, have admired the clarity and precision of her drawing, and her four decades of employment at the center of the British botanical world testifies to a continuing value for her skills.

In the course of Smith's long association with Kew Gardens, she created 1,500 plates for volumes of Icones Plantarum, a monumental survey of Kew's plants then being edited by Hooker. Beginning with Plate 1354, she was the sole artist for this series, with funds being provided to keep her in this role for as long as she chose to do it. She also made reproductions of plates missing from incomplete volumes in Kew's library, and she became the first botanical artist to extensively depict the flora of New Zealand.

She was especially admired for her ability to create credible illustrations from dried, flattened, and sometimes imperfect specimens. Her exceptional contributions to Kew Gardens led to her being designated the first official botanical artist of Kew Gardens in 1898. In 1921, the year she retired from Kew, she was named an associate of the Linnean Society—only the second woman to have achieved this honor. She was also awarded the Silver Veitch Memorial Medal of the Royal Horticultural Society for her botanical draughtsmanship generally and for her contributions to Curtis's Botanical Magazine in particular.

The plant genera Smithiantha (in the family Gesneriaceae) and Smithiella (viz. Smithiella myriantha, a synonym of Pilea myriantha) were named in her honor. The Matilda Smith Memorial Prize sponsored by the Kew Guild in her memory is given to the best practical student.

== Death ==
Smith died on 29 December 1926 at Gloucester Road, Kew, and is buried in Richmond Cemetery.

== Publications illustrated by Smith ==
- Cheeseman, T. F. (1914) Illustrations of the New Zealand flora. Wellington, John Mackay.
Illustrations by Matilda Smith in Curtis's Botanical Magazine
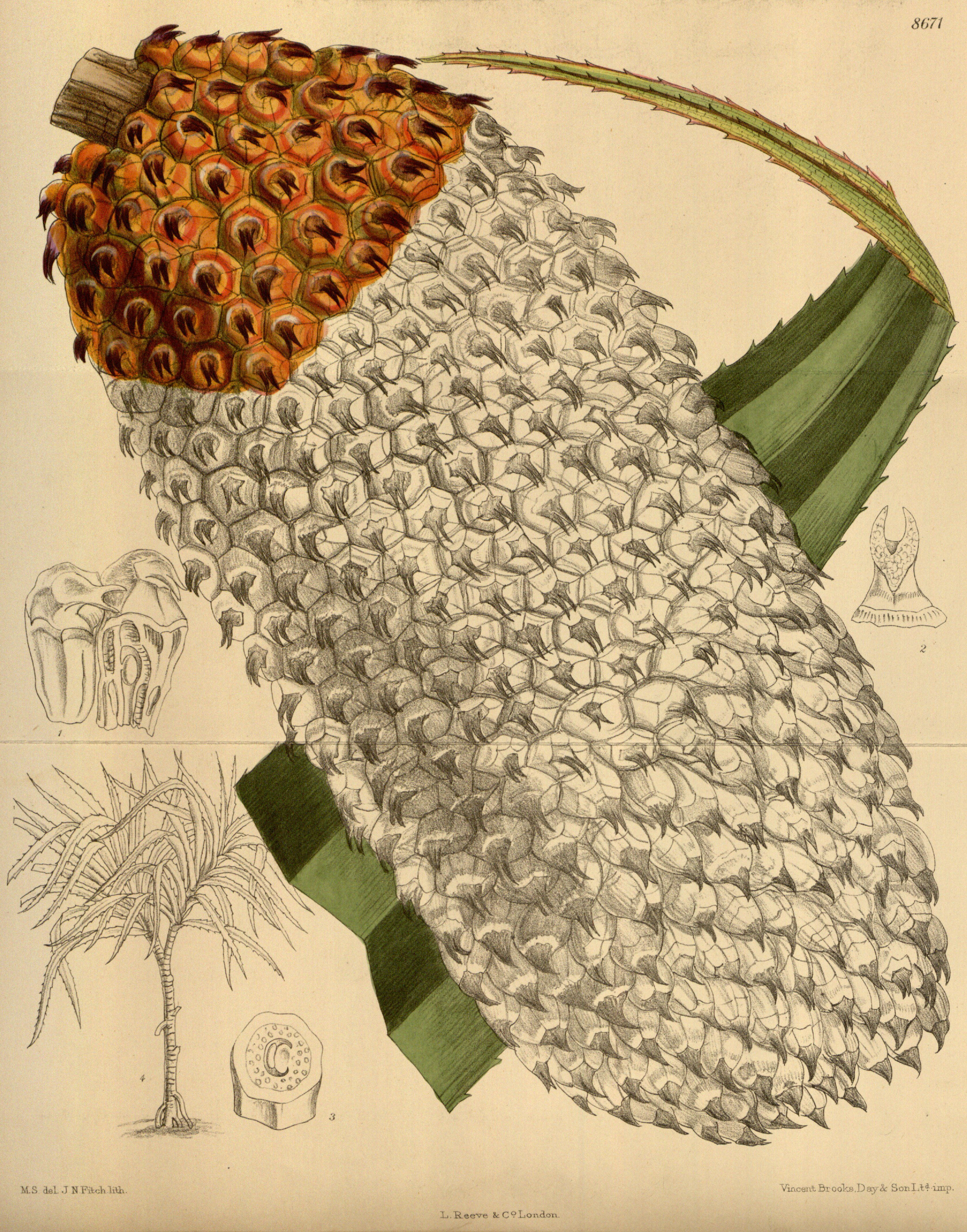
Pandanus furcatus, 1916.

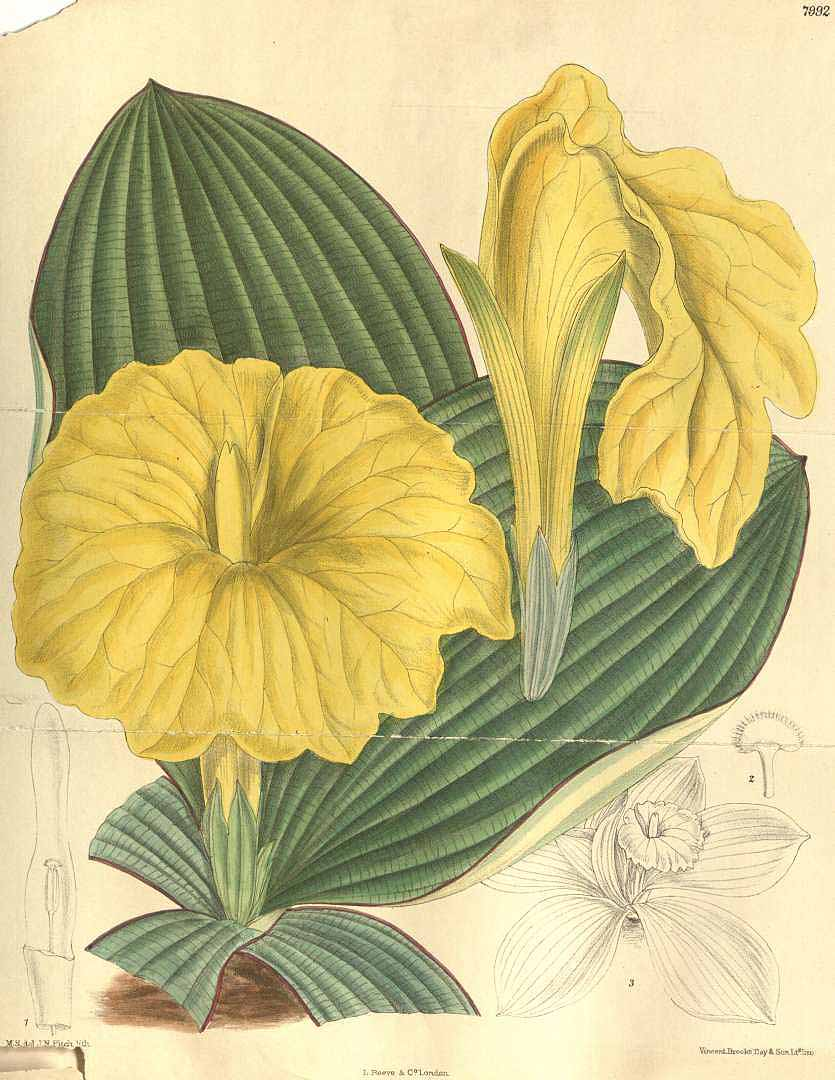
Costus spectabilis, 1905.

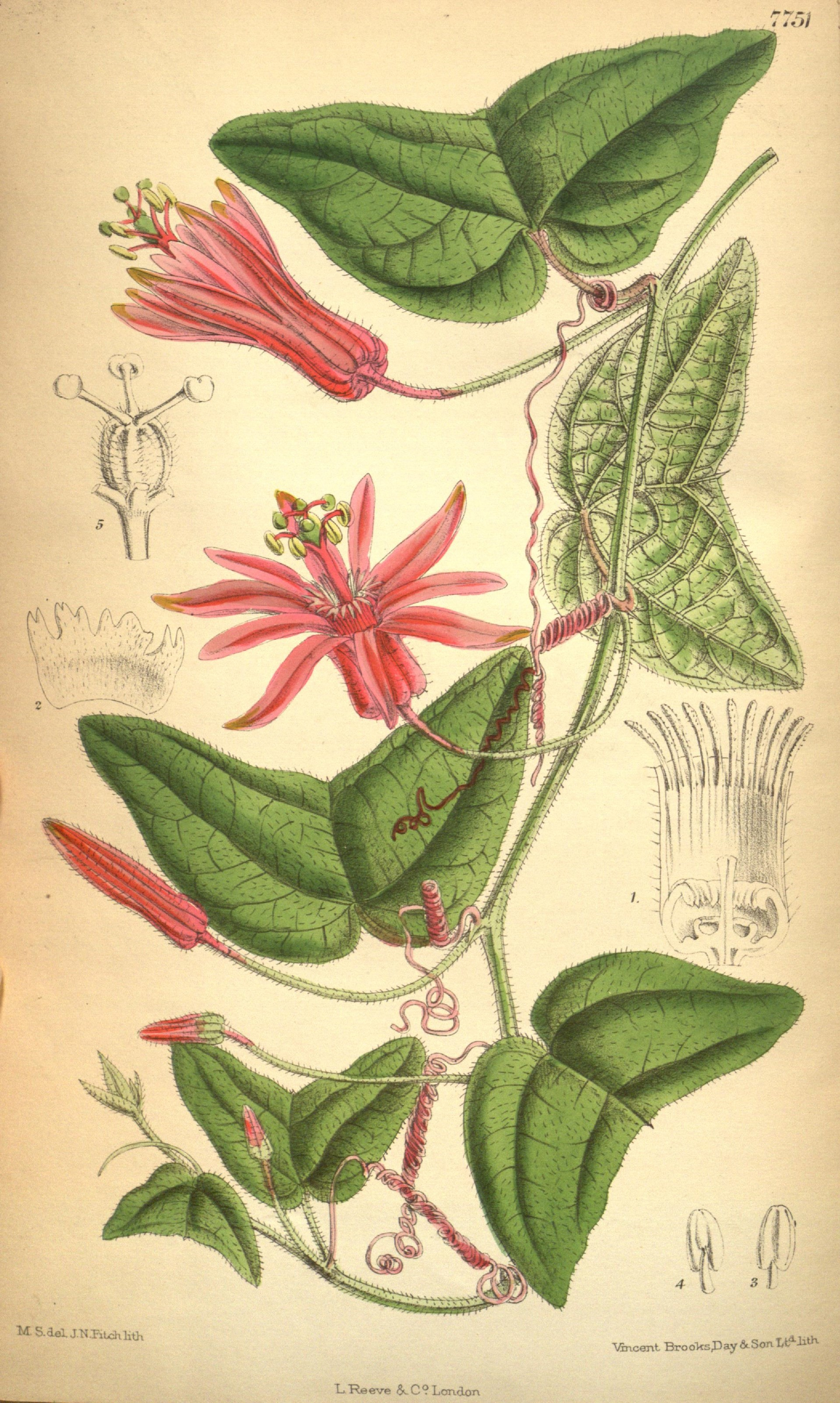
Passiflora sanguinolenta, 1900.

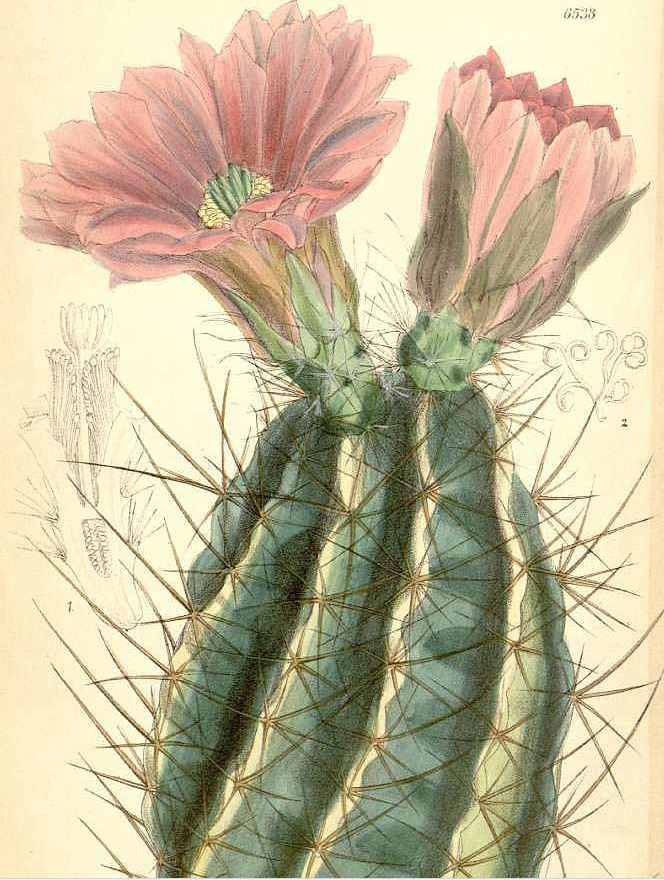
Echinocereus fendleri, 1880.

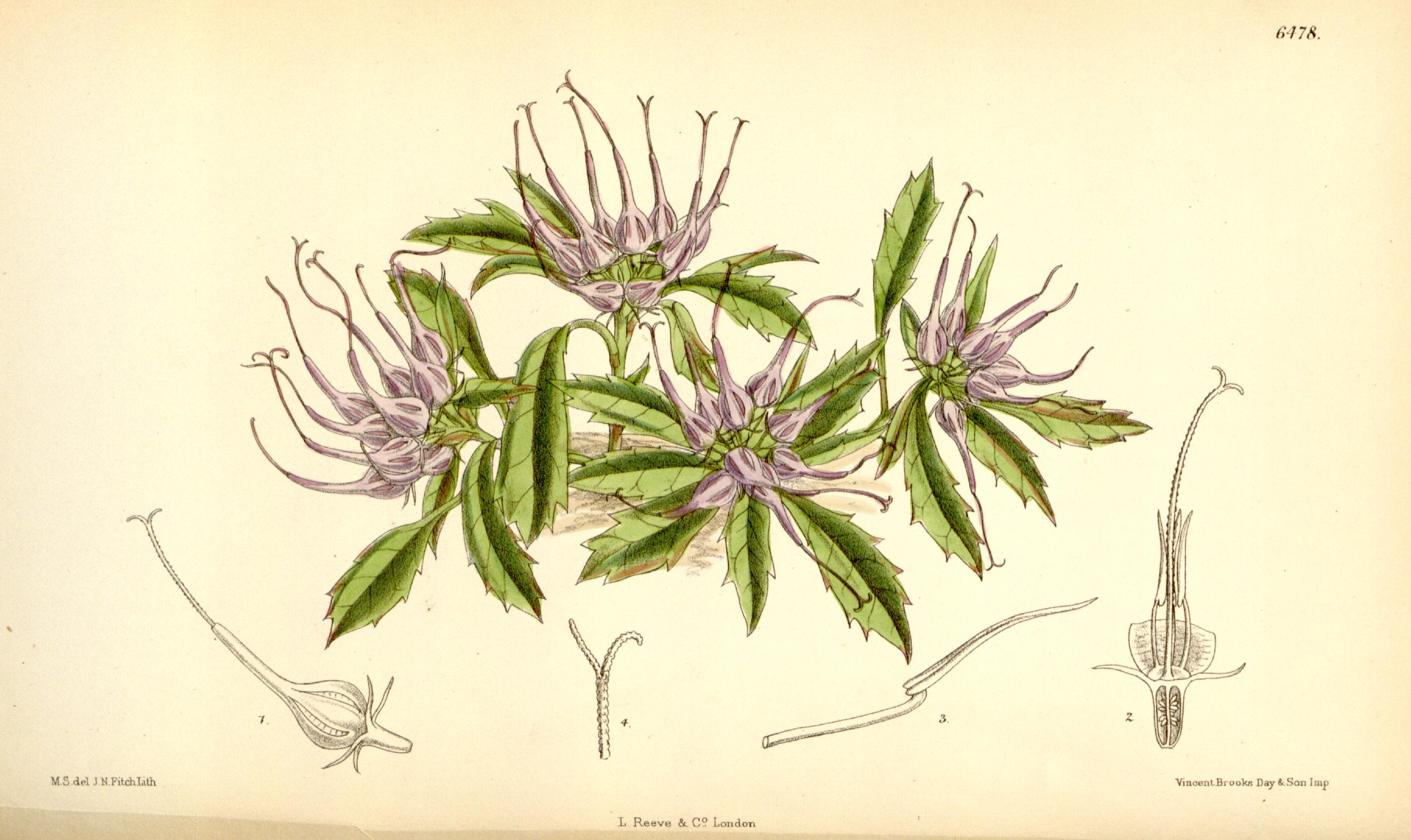
Phyteuma comosum, 1880.

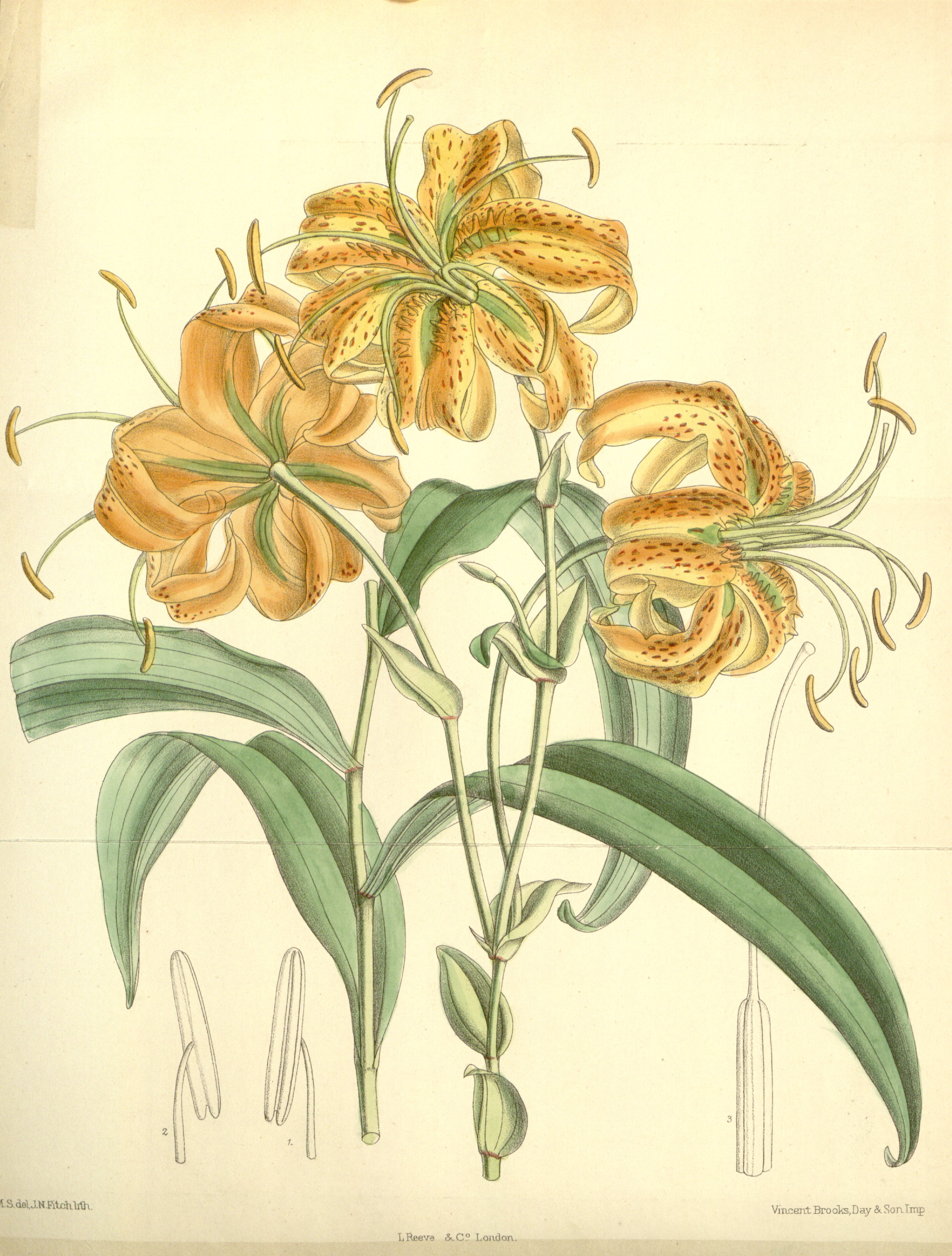
Lilium henryi, 1891.

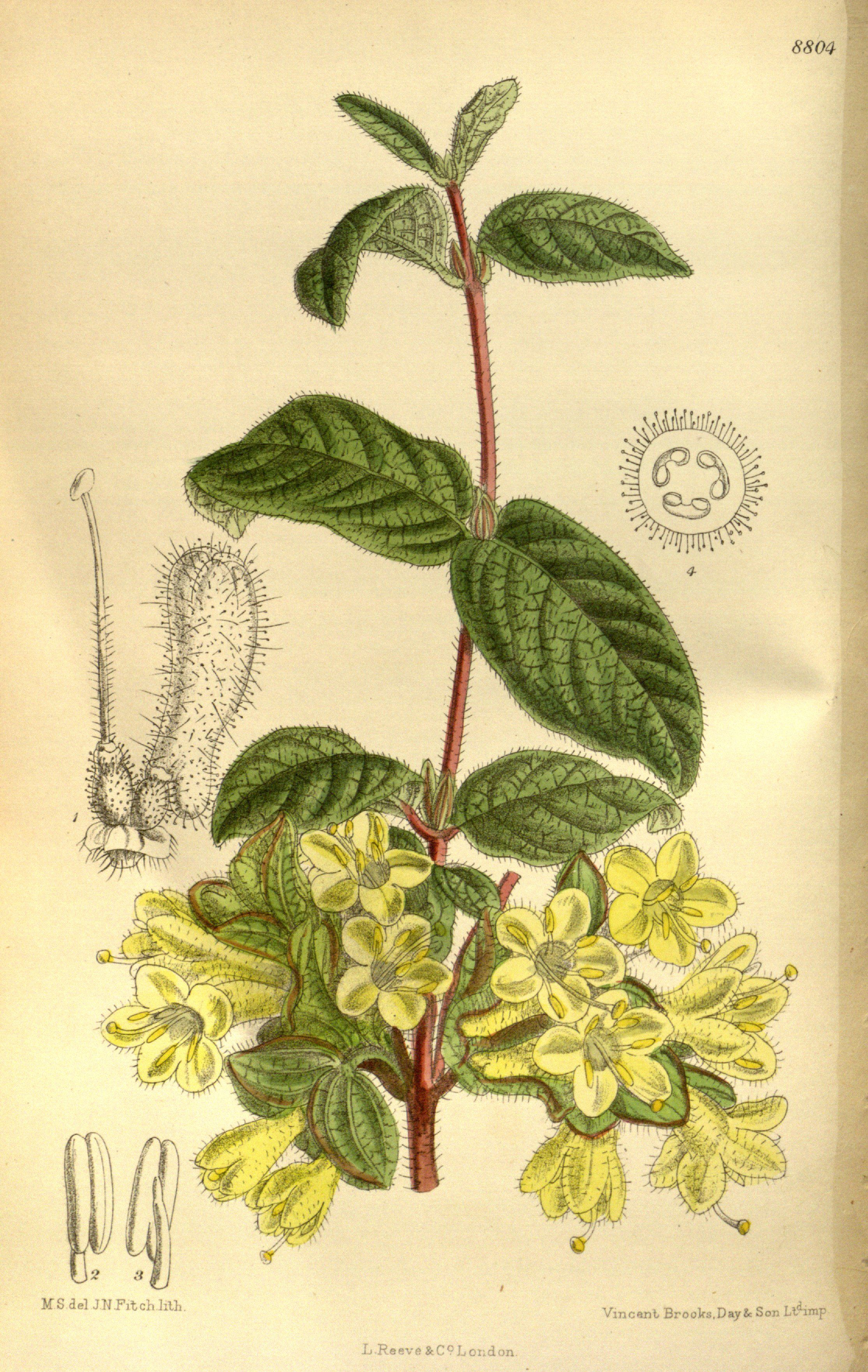
Lonicera hispida (as L. chaetocarpa), 1919.
