= Frances Harriet Hooker =

English botanist and translator (1825–1874)

Frances Hooker
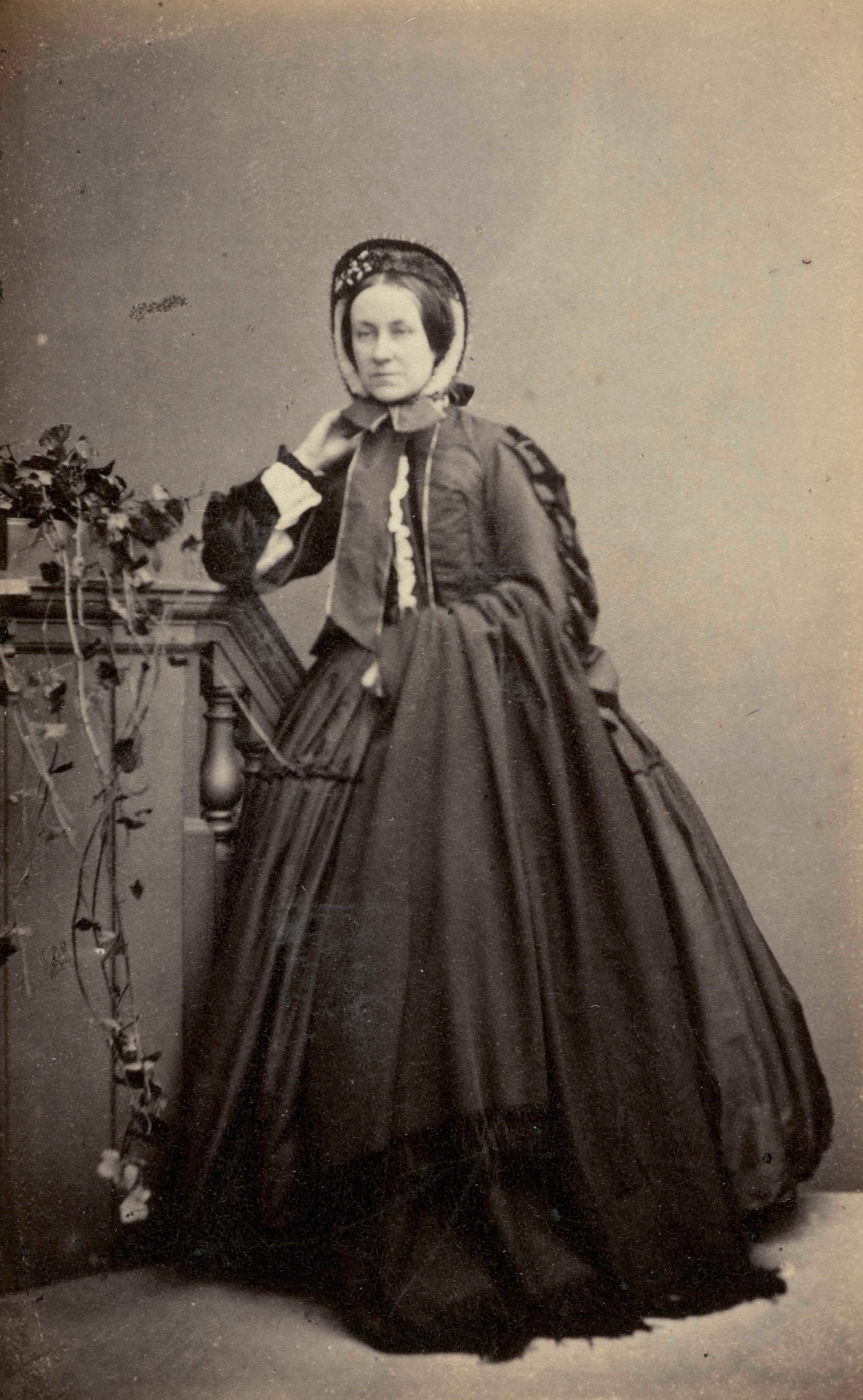
- Born: Frances Harriet Henslow; 30 April 1825; Cambridge, England, British Empire
- Died: 13 November 1874 (aged 49); London, England, British Empire
- Spouse: Joseph Hooker (m. 1851)
- Children: 7, including Harriet and Reginald
- Parent(s): John Henslow; Harriet Jenyns

Frances Harriet Hooker (née Henslow; 30 April 1825 – 13 November 1874) was an English botanist.

In 1872, she translated A General System of Botany, Descriptive and Analytical by Emmanuel Maout and Joseph Decaisne into English from the original French.

== Biography ==
The daughter of Reverend John Henslow, a botany professor at the University of Cambridge, she was born Frances Harriet Henslow in Cambridge.

In 1851, she married Joseph Hooker; the couple had four sons and three daughters. Her daughter Harriet Anne Thiselton-Dyer was a botanical illustrator; her son, Reginald, was a statistician.

== Death ==
Frances Harriet Hooker died in Kew, aged 49, on 13 November 1874.

== Ancestry ==
Ancestors of Frances Harriet Hooker

John Henslow
John Henslow
John Henslow; 1796-1861
Frances Henslow; 1825-1874
John Jenyns
George Jenyns
Harriet Jenyns
William Heberden
Mary Heberden
Mary Wollaston
