= Harriet Anne Thiselton-Dyer =

British botanical illustrator

Lady Harriet Anne Thiselton-Dyer
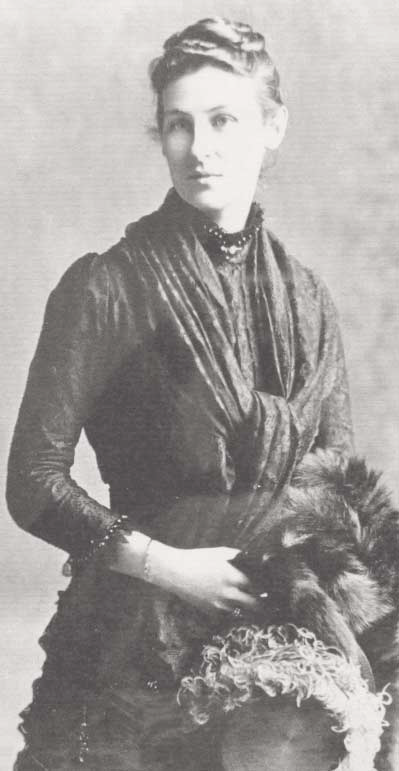
- Born: Harriet Anne Hooker; 1854; Hitcham, Suffolk, England
- Died: 1945 (aged 90–91); Weir Quay, Devon, England
- Known for: Botanical illustration
- Spouse: Sir William Turner Thiselton-Dyer (m. 1877)
- Elected: 2

Lady Harriet Anne Thiselton-Dyer (née Hooker; 1854–1945) was a British botanical illustrator.

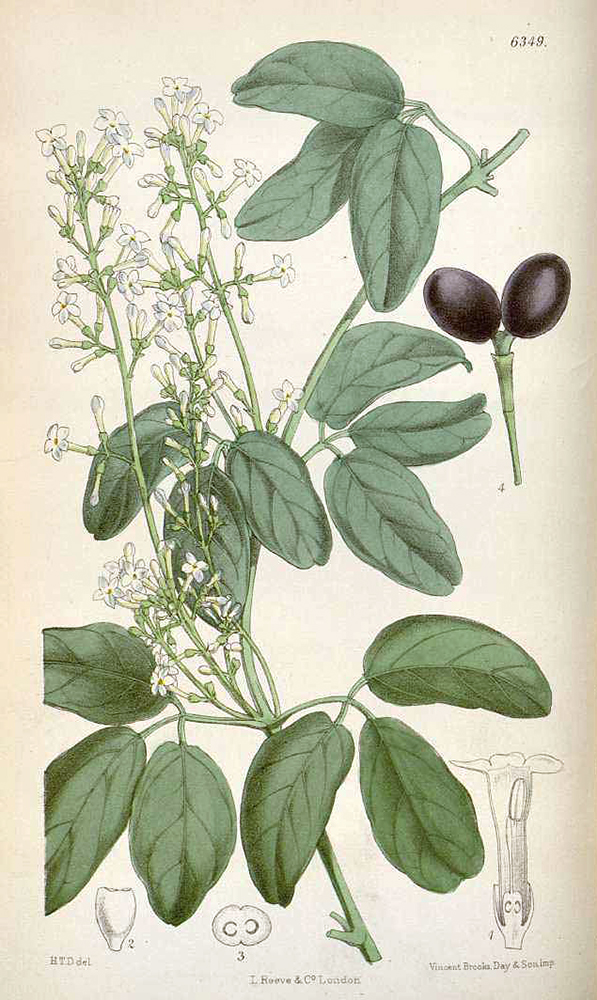
Illustration of Jasminum didymum by Harriet Anne Thiselton-Dyer for Curtis's Botanical Magazine, 1878.

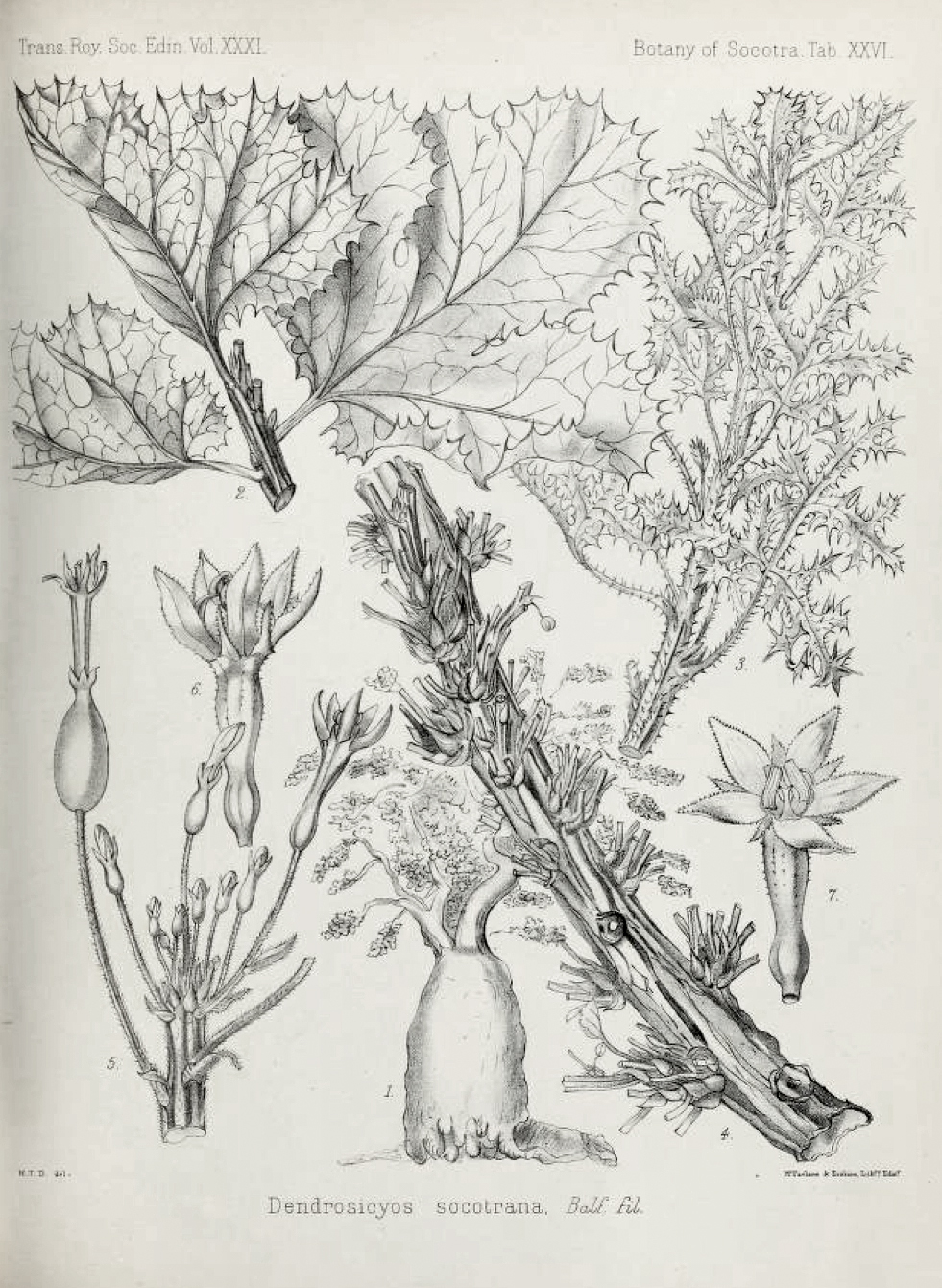
Drawing of the twigs, foliage, and flowers of Dendrosicyos socotranus. The two lower left elements were copied from another source (Schweinfurth), but all the others were drawn by Harriet Anne Thiselton-Dyer from dried specimens.

== Life and career ==
Harriet Anne Hooker was born in 1854 to the botanist and explorer Joseph Dalton Hooker and Frances Harriet Henslow, who was the daughter of botanist and Cambridge University professor John Stevens Henslow. In 1877, she married the botanist William Turner Thiselton-Dyer (later knighted), with whom she had a son and a daughter.

Thiselton-Dyer belonged to a generation of English women who transformed their interest in botany into professional careers. She studied with the noted botanical illustrator Walter Hood Fitch, who was the lead artist for Curtis's Botanical Magazine. After Fitch resigned from the magazine in 1877 following a dispute with her father—for whom Fitch had been preparing illustrations for several books—Thiselton-Dyer stepped in. She rendered almost 100 illustrations for publication during the period 1878–1880, helping to keep the magazine viable until Matilda Smith took over as lead illustrator.

In 1894–95, Thiselton-Dyer painted some 550 copies of Brazilian botanist João Barbosa Rodrigues's orchid paintings, which had been lent to her by the botanist Alfred Cogniaux, who was using some of them to illustrate a work on Brazilian flora.

Unfortunately, the original drawings disappeared in Brazil sometime after Rodrigues's death and are now lost, making Thiselton-Dyer's copies—housed at Kew Gardens—a uniquely valuable resource on Rodrigues's work. In 1996, some of these copies were published to accompany an article on Rodrigues that appeared, fittingly enough, in Curtis's Botanical Magazine.

Thiselton-Dyer was also known as an accomplished gardener. In 1905, the Thiselton-Dyers moved to the Cotswolds. When her husband died in 1928, Harriet moved to Devon, where she died in 1945.

In 2013, Thiselton-Dyer's work was included in the exhibition "The Feminine Perspective: Women Artists and Illustrators" at the Chicago Botanic Garden, alongside work by Henriette Vincent, Ellen Robbins, and others.

== Gallery ==
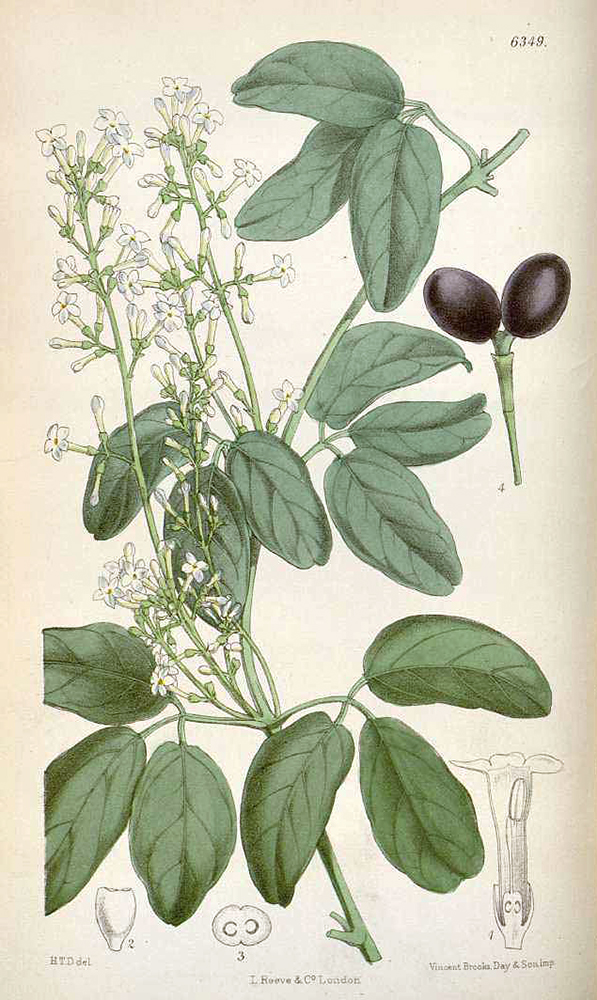

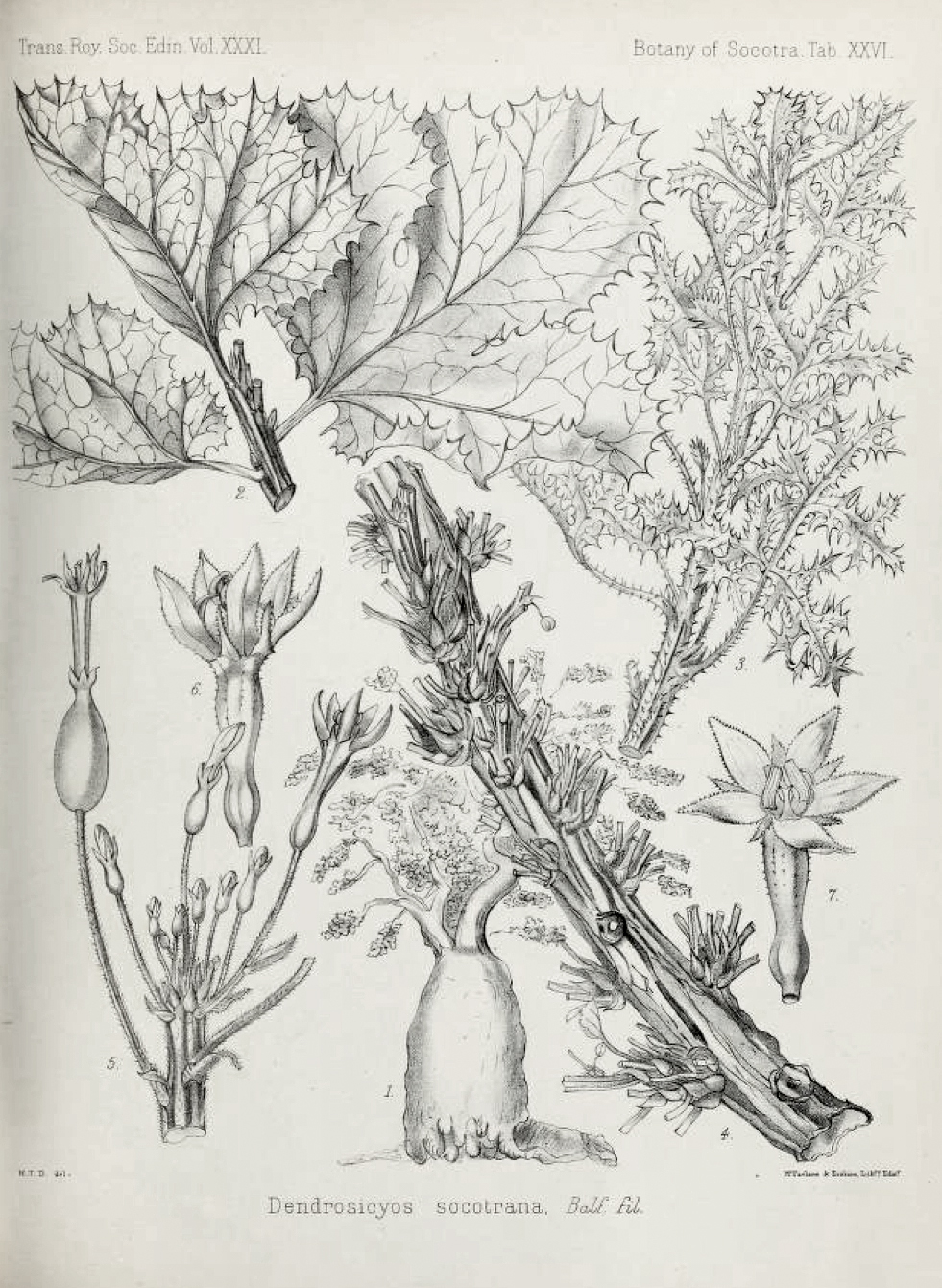

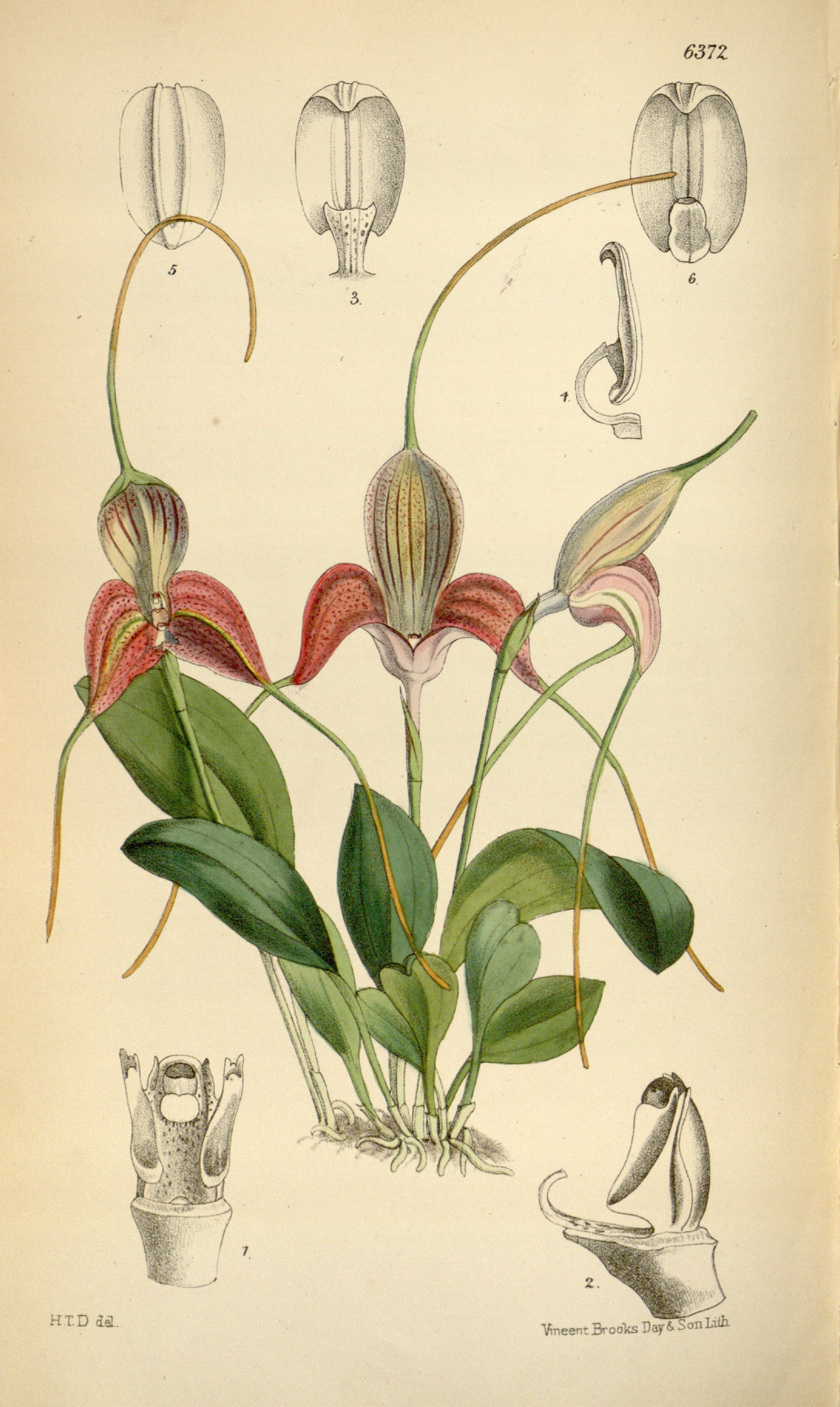

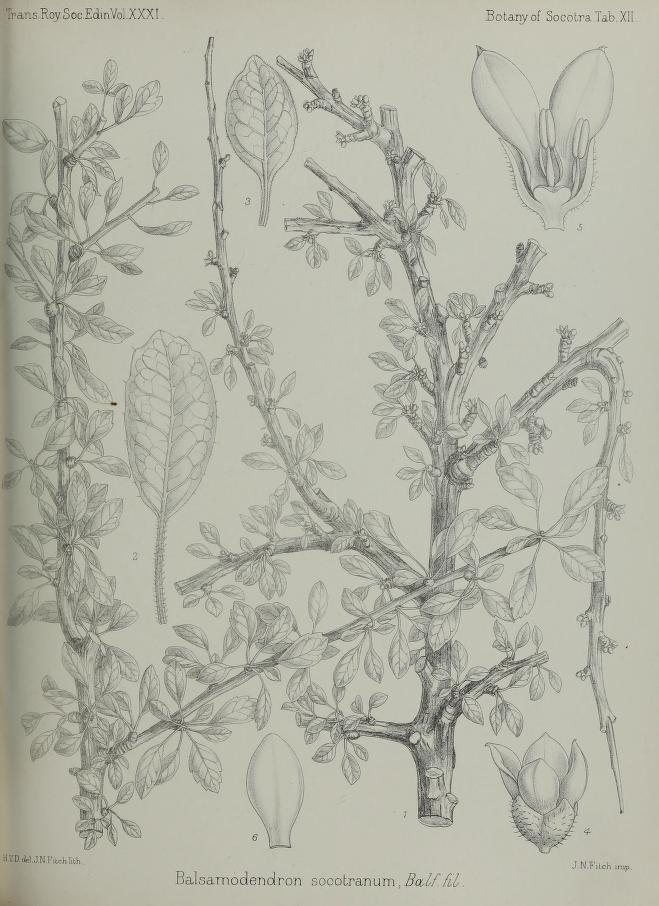

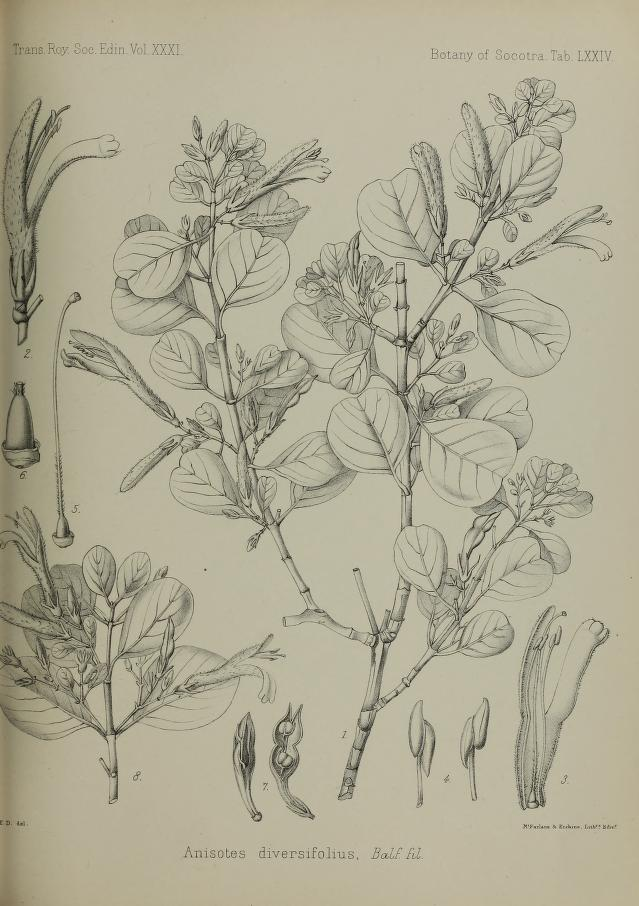

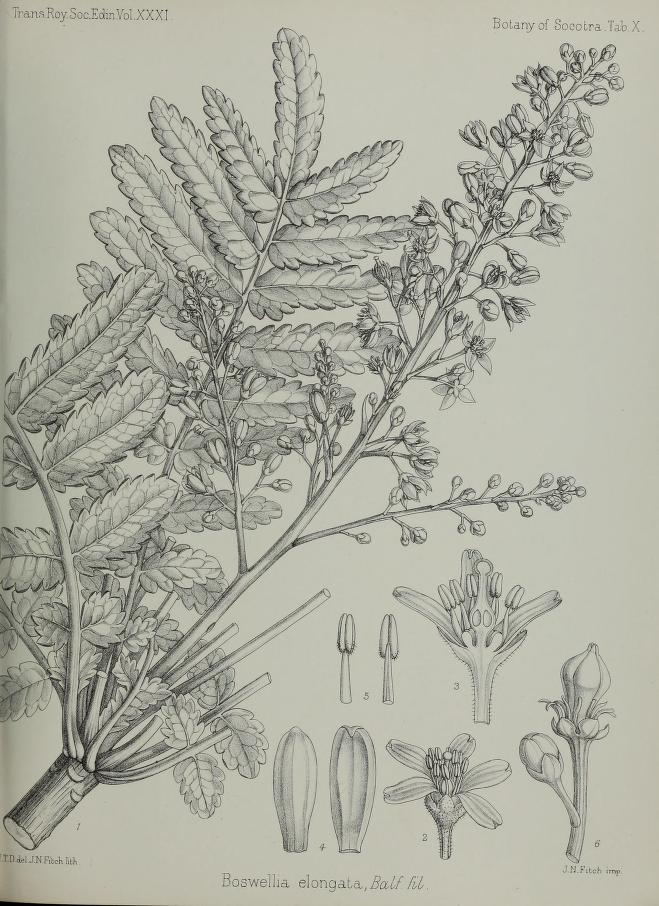

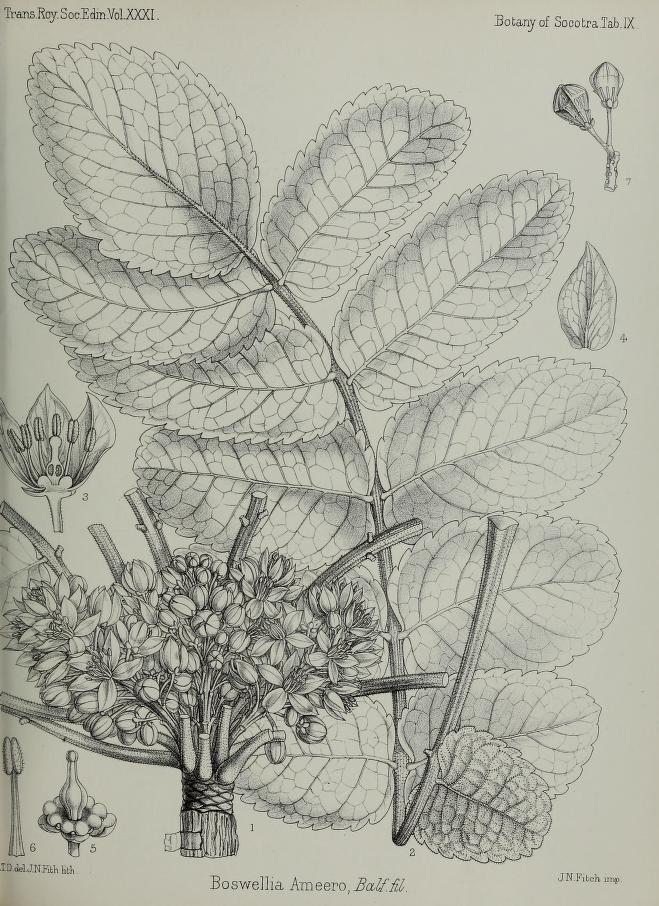

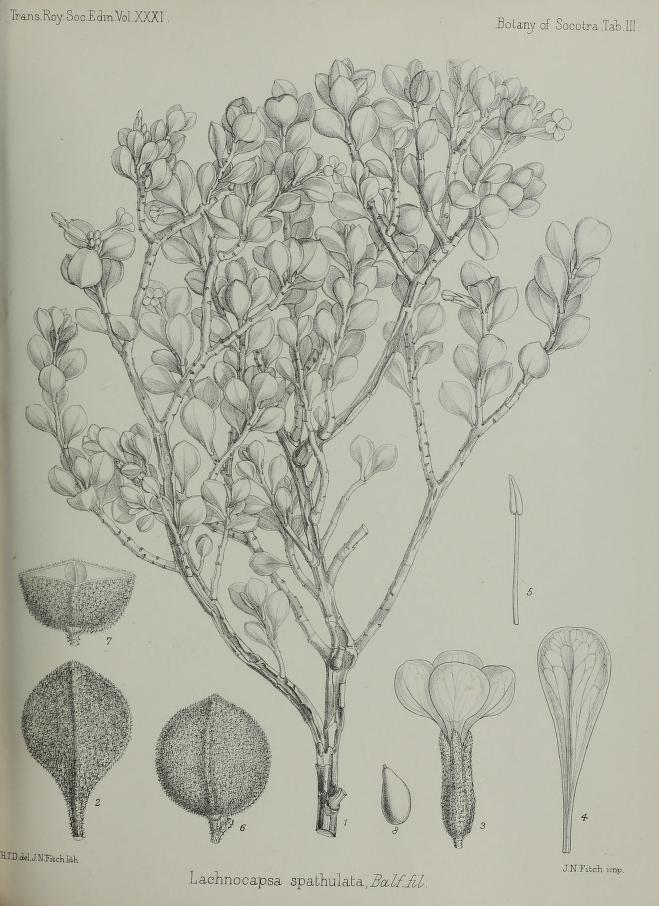

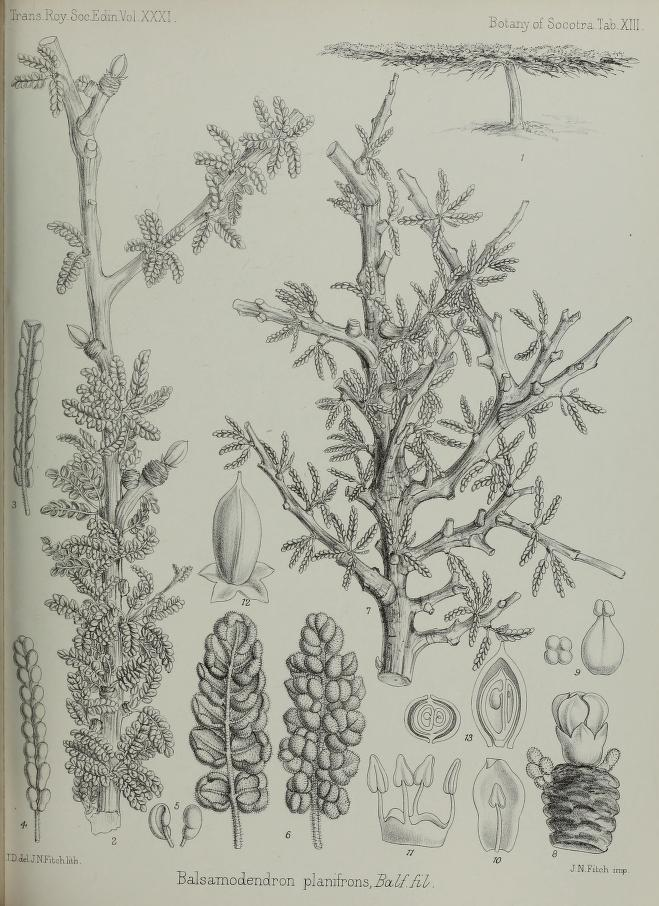

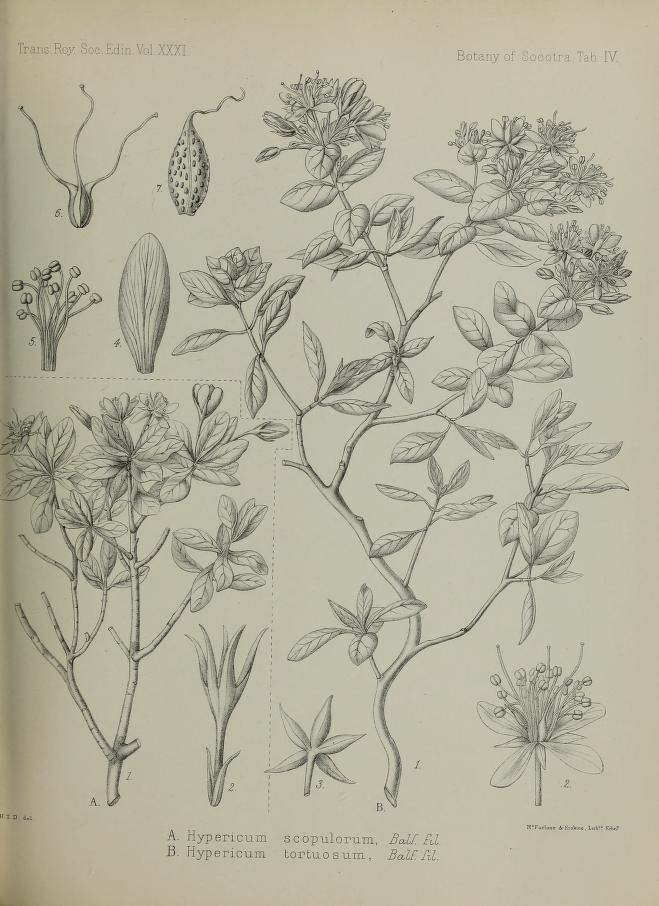

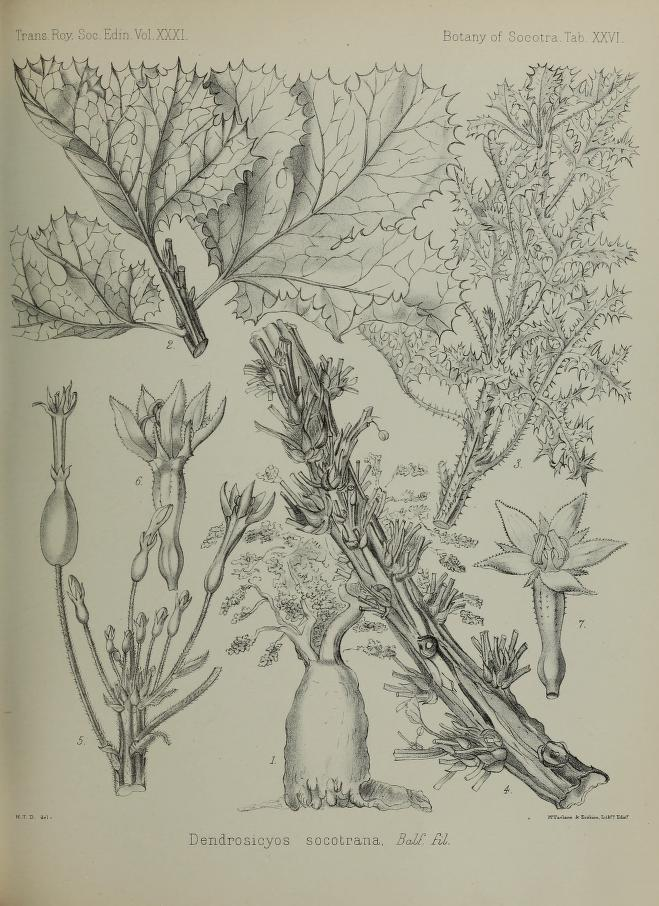

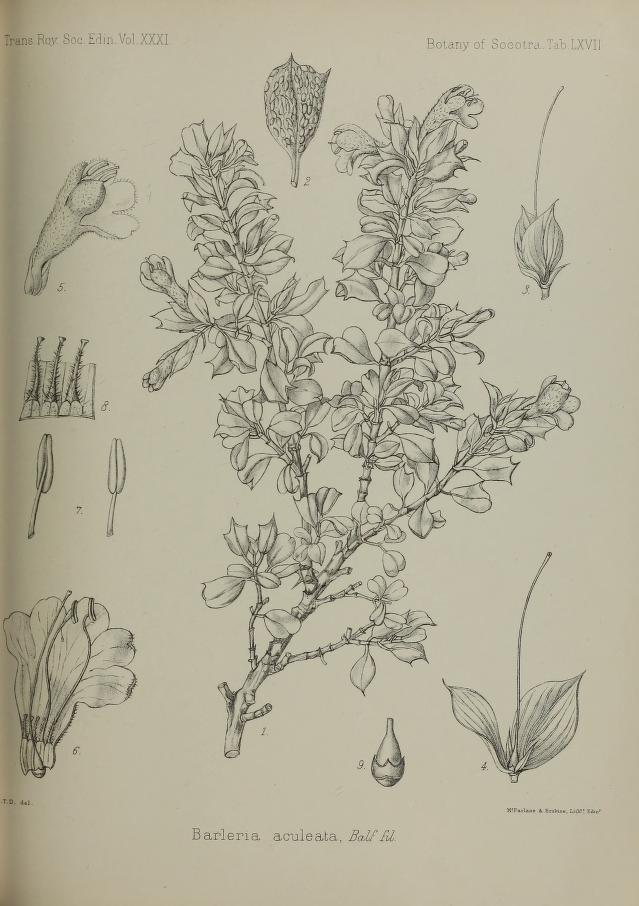

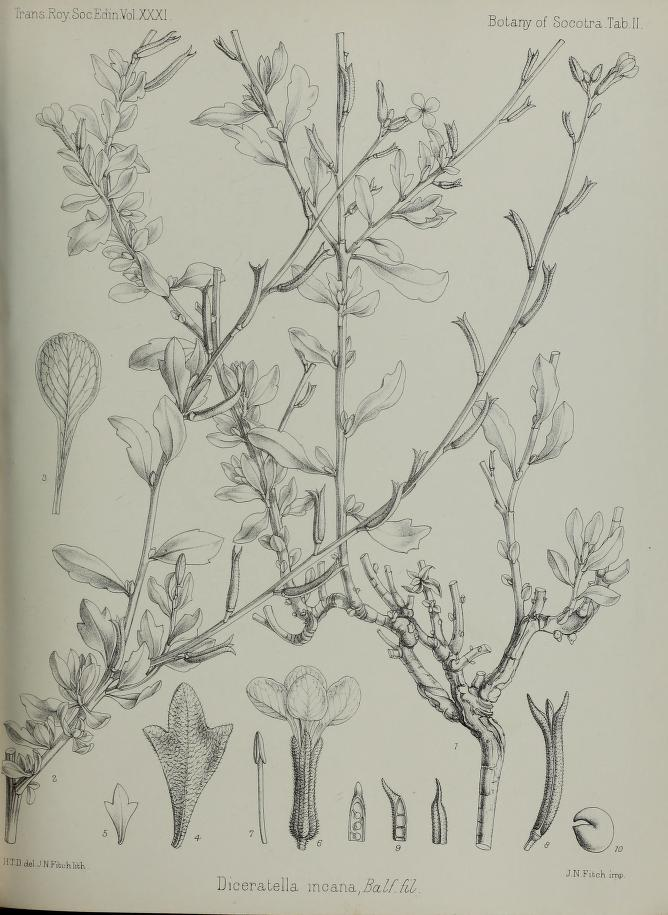

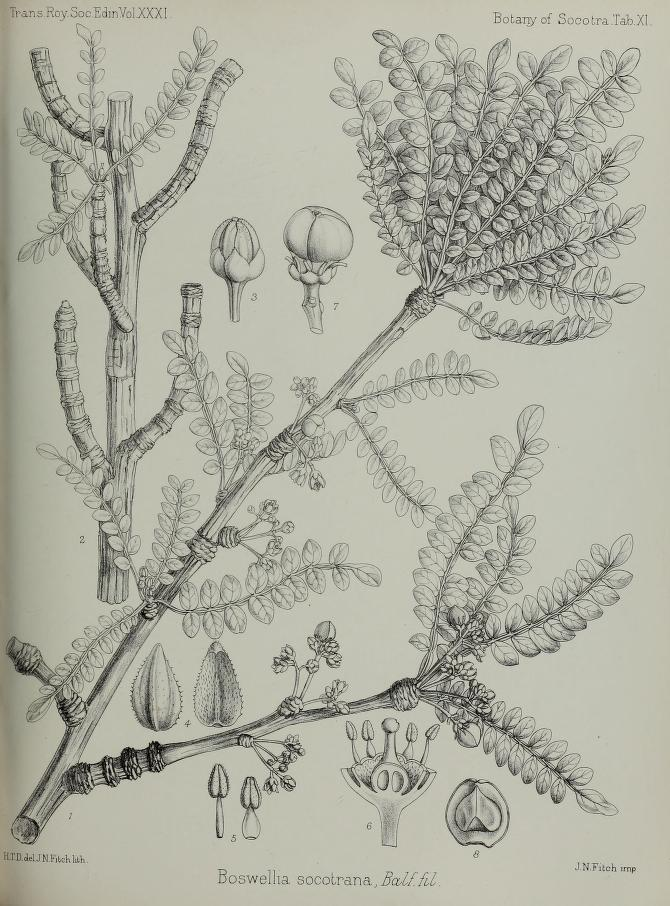

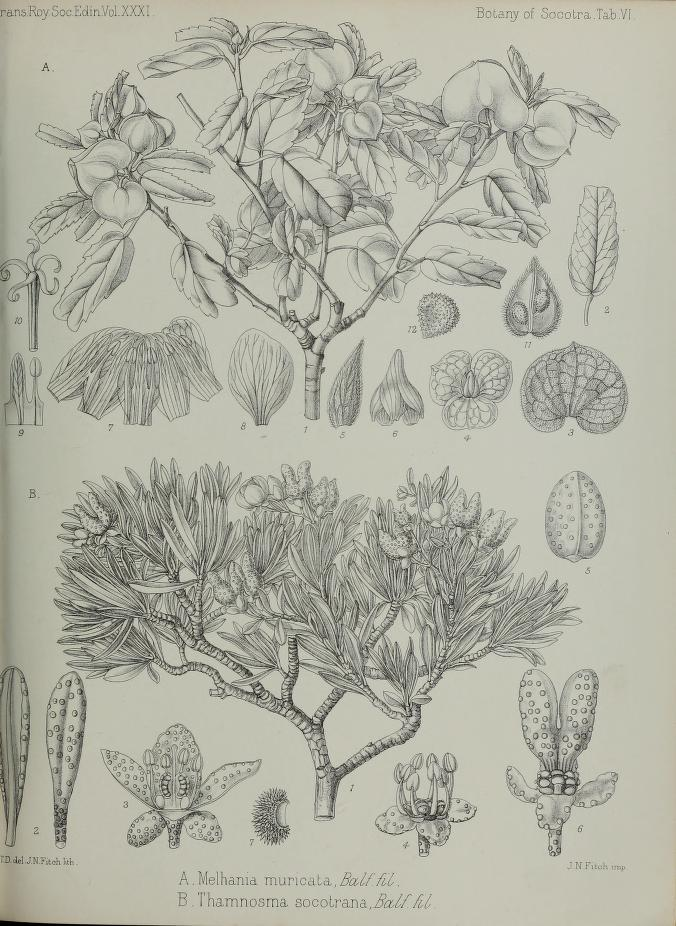

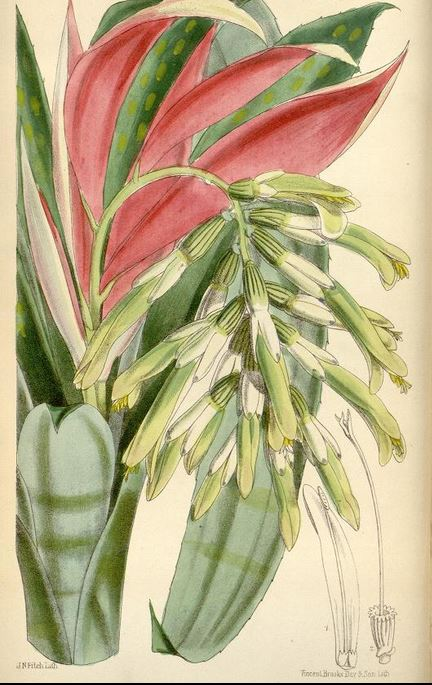

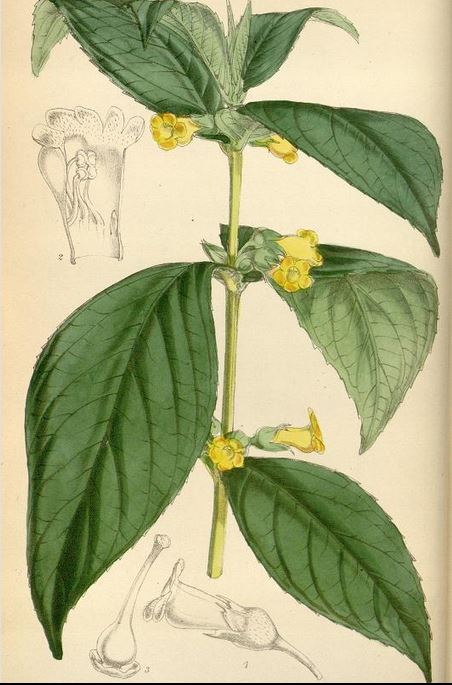

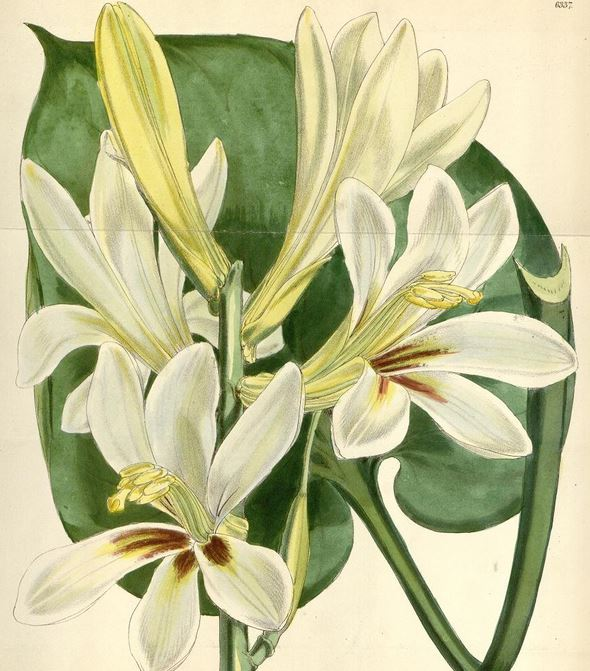

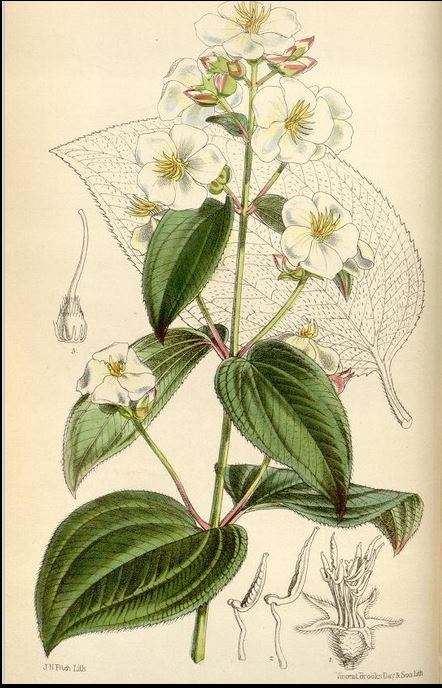

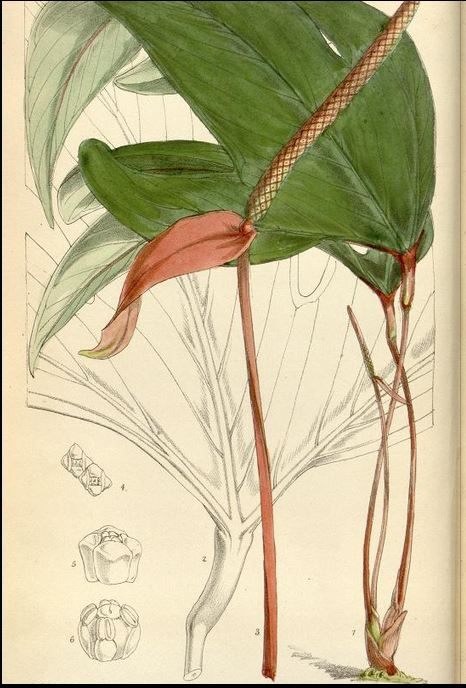

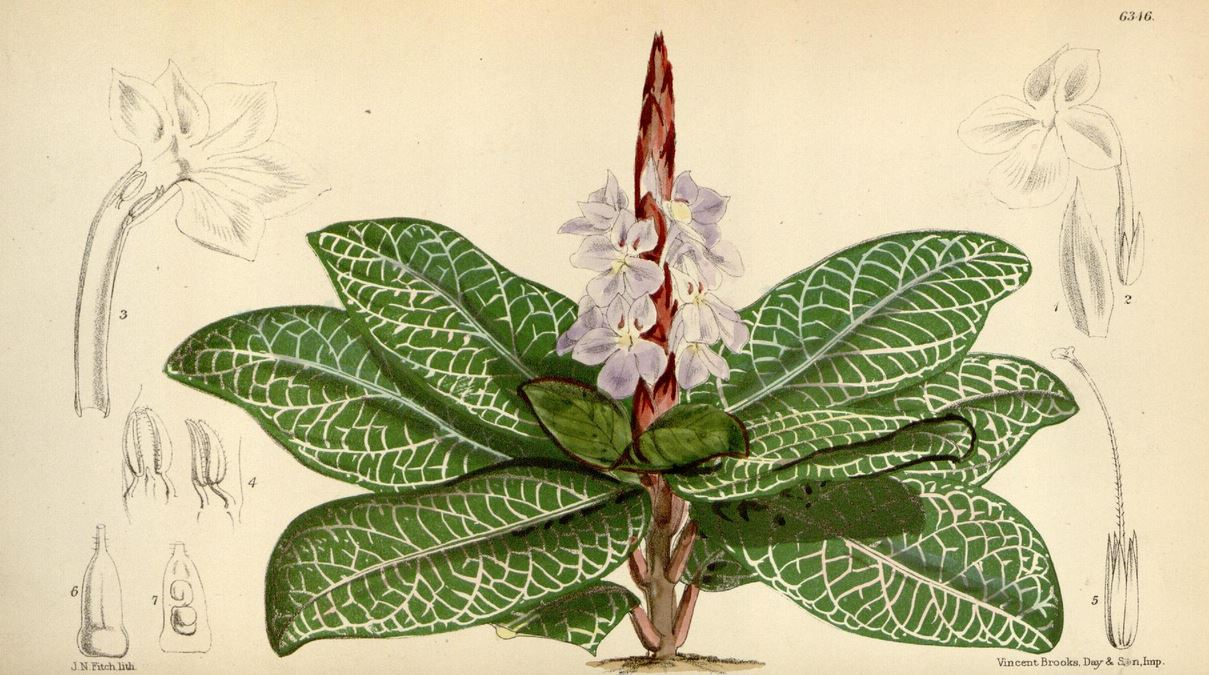

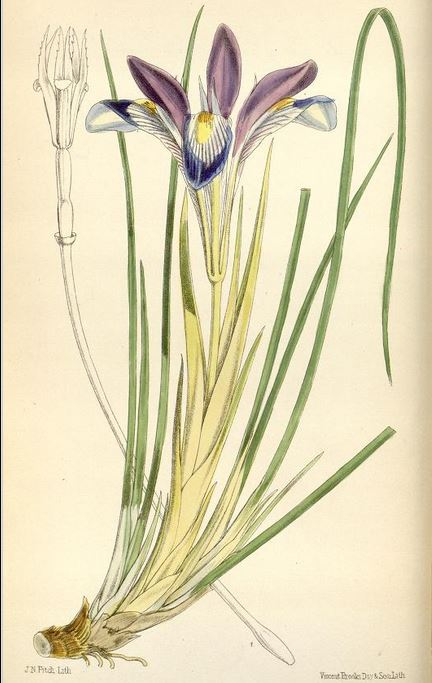

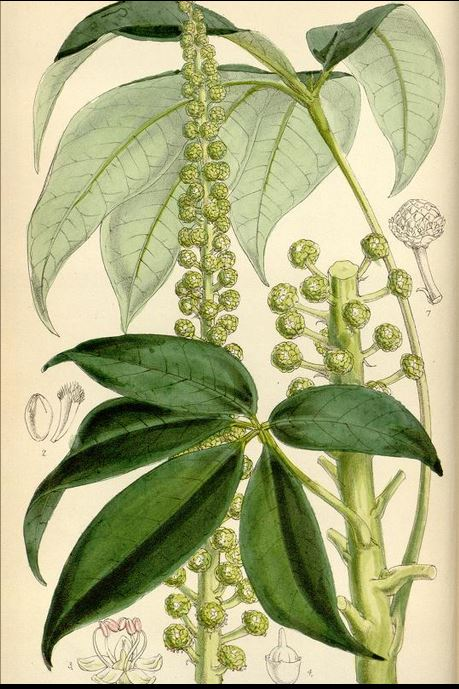

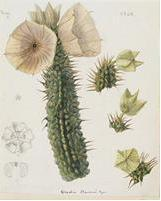
