= Reginald Hawthorn Hooker =

British statistician and meteorologist

Reginald Hawthorn Hooker (12 January 1867 – 2 June 1944) English civil servant, statistician, and meteorologist. Hooker was a pioneer in the application of correlation analysis to economics and agricultural meteorology.

== Biography ==
Reginald Hawthorn Hooker was born at Kew; he was the fourth son of Sir Joseph Dalton Hooker, the distinguished botanist and friend of Charles Darwin and his first wife Frances Harriet Henslow (1825–1874), daughter of John Stevens Henslow. He was educated in Paris and at Trinity College, Cambridge, where he read mathematics (Junior Optime BA 1889, MA 1893). In 1891 he went to the Royal Statistical Society as assistant secretary and sub-editor of its journal. In 1895 he joined the Statistical Branch of the Board of Agriculture; he remained with the Board, later renamed the Ministry of Agriculture, until his retirement in 1927. He married Olive Marion Rücker (1878–1933) in 1911 and they had three sons and a daughter.

Hooker was a pioneer in applying correlation analysis to socio-economic data. He worked very closely with his friend Udny Yule, who had developed some of the basic theory and was interested in the same kind of applications. Yule recalled how Hooker "joined with me in the early days of our acquaintance to form a very select Statistical Dining Club of two members, which met fairly regularly after meetings of the Society." In the preface to the Introduction to the Theory of Statistics Yule gave fulsome thanks to Hooker for his help. In 1907 Hooker published a paper on weather and crops which Ronald Fisher later described as "magnificent". Hooker subsequently wrote a number of papers on meteorology. In 1920 and 1921 he served as president of the Royal Meteorological Society. He was a very effective president, as Dines recalled.

Like his contemporary and fellow civil servant, W. F. Sheppard, Hooker was an out-of-hours statistician. Although his research was connected with food and agriculture, he did not carry them out as part of his official duties. Indeed, Yule commented, "The importance and value of Hooker’s scientific work ... was never, in my opinion, appreciated at its proper worth by the Ministry at the time when he was still in its service." Yule also noted that, when Hooker retired, he chose to live "far away from any thoughts of the Ministry." In his obituary, Dines noted that meteorologists had not followed up Hooker's work on weather and crops. Hooker is chiefly remembered today for his pioneering work on time series analysis in his papers of 1901–5.

== Writings of R. H. Hooker ==
The bibliography in Yule's obituary lists 22 papers of which the following are a sample.

- On the Relation Between Wages and the Numbers Employed in the Coal Mining Industry, Journal of the Royal Statistical Society, Vol. 57, No. 4 (Dec., 1894), pp. 627–642.
- Correlation of the Marriage-Rate with Trade, Journal of the Royal Statistical Society, Vol. 64, No. 3 (Sep., 1901), pp. 485–492. (reprinted in The Foundations of Econometric Analysis edited by David F. Hendry and Mary S. Morgan, Cambridge : Cambridge University Press, 1995.)
- The Suspension of the Berlin Produce Exchange and its Effect upon Corn Prices, Journal of the Royal Statistical Society, Vol. 64, No. 4 (Dec., 1901), pp. 574–613. (reprinted in Classic Futures edited by Lester G. Telser, London : Risk, 2000.)
- On the Correlation of Successive Observations, Journal of the Royal Statistical Society, Vol. 68, No. 4 (Dec., 1905), pp. 696–703.
- (with G. U. Yule) Note on Estimating the Relative Influence of Two Variables upon a Third, Journal of the Royal Statistical Society, Vol. 69, No. 1 (Mar., 1906), pp. 197–200.
- Correlation of the Weather and Crops, Journal of the Royal Statistical Society, Vol. 70, No. 1 (Mar., 1907), pp. 1–51.
- Forecasting the Crops from the Weather, Quarterly Journal of the Royal Meteorological Society, Vol. 47, (1921) pp. 75–99.
- The Weather and the Crops in Eastern England, 1885–1921, Quarterly Journal of the Royal Meteorological Society, Vol. 48, (1922) pp. 115–38.

== Obituaries ==
- G. Udny Yule (1944) Reginald Hawthorn Hooker, M.A., Journal of the Royal Statistical Society, Vol. 107, No. 1, pp. 74–77.
- J. S. Dines (1944) Obituary: Mr. R. H. Hooker, M. A., Quarterly Journal of the Royal Meteorological Society, Vol. 70, pp. 232–233.

== Discussions ==
- J. L. Klein (1997) Statistical Visions in Time, Cambridge: Cambridge University Press.
- M. S. Morgan (1997) Searching for Causal Relations in Economic Statistics, in V. R. McKim & S. P. Turner (eds) Causality in Crisis, Notre Dame Ind: University of Notre Dame Press.
