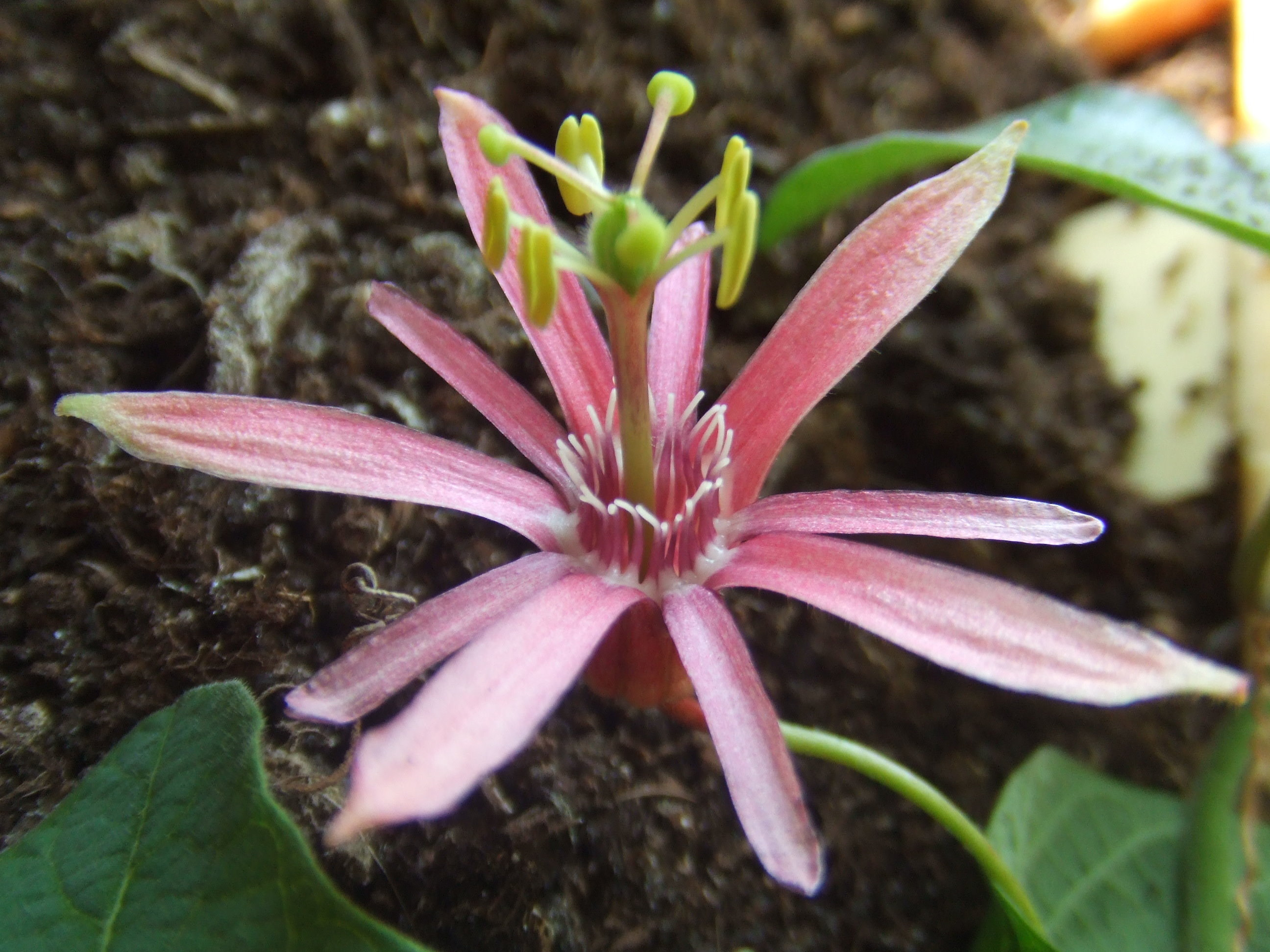
- Passiflora sanguinolenta flower

Scientific classification
- Kingdom: Plantae
- Clade: Tracheophytes
- Clade: Angiosperms
- Clade: Eudicots
- Clade: Rosids
- Order: Malpighiales
- Family: Passifloraceae
- Genus: Passiflora
- Species: P. sanguinolenta

Binomial name
- Passiflora sanguinolenta Mast. & Linden

Synonyms
- Passiflora mastersiana Harms

= Passiflora sanguinolenta =

Species of vine

Passiflora sanguinolenta is a flowering plant in the family Passifloraceae. It is sometimes referred to by the common name blood red passion flower and is native to Ecuador and Peru.

== Other Resources ==
- Species entry on Tropicos.org
