= Martinet (disambiguation) =

A martinet is a type of whip. Martinet is also a French name and may refer to:

== People ==
- André Martinet, French linguist
- Charles Martinet, American actor
- François-Nicolas Martinet, French ornithologist
- Jean Martinet, French drillmaster
- Jean-Louis Martinet, French composer
- Jeanne Martinet, French semiotician
- Lucien Martinet, French rower who competed in the 1900 Summer Olympics
- Louis Martinet, French painter, art gallery owner, and theatre director
- Pierre Martinet, French spy

== Places ==
- Le Martinet, a commune in Languedoc-Roussillon, France
- Martinet, Vendée, a commune in the Pays de Loire, France

== Other ==
- Martinet (Dungeons & Dragons), a fictional character
- The Miles Martinet aircraft
- The SNCAC Martinet aircraft
