= Principle of least effort =

Idea that agents prefer to do what's easiest

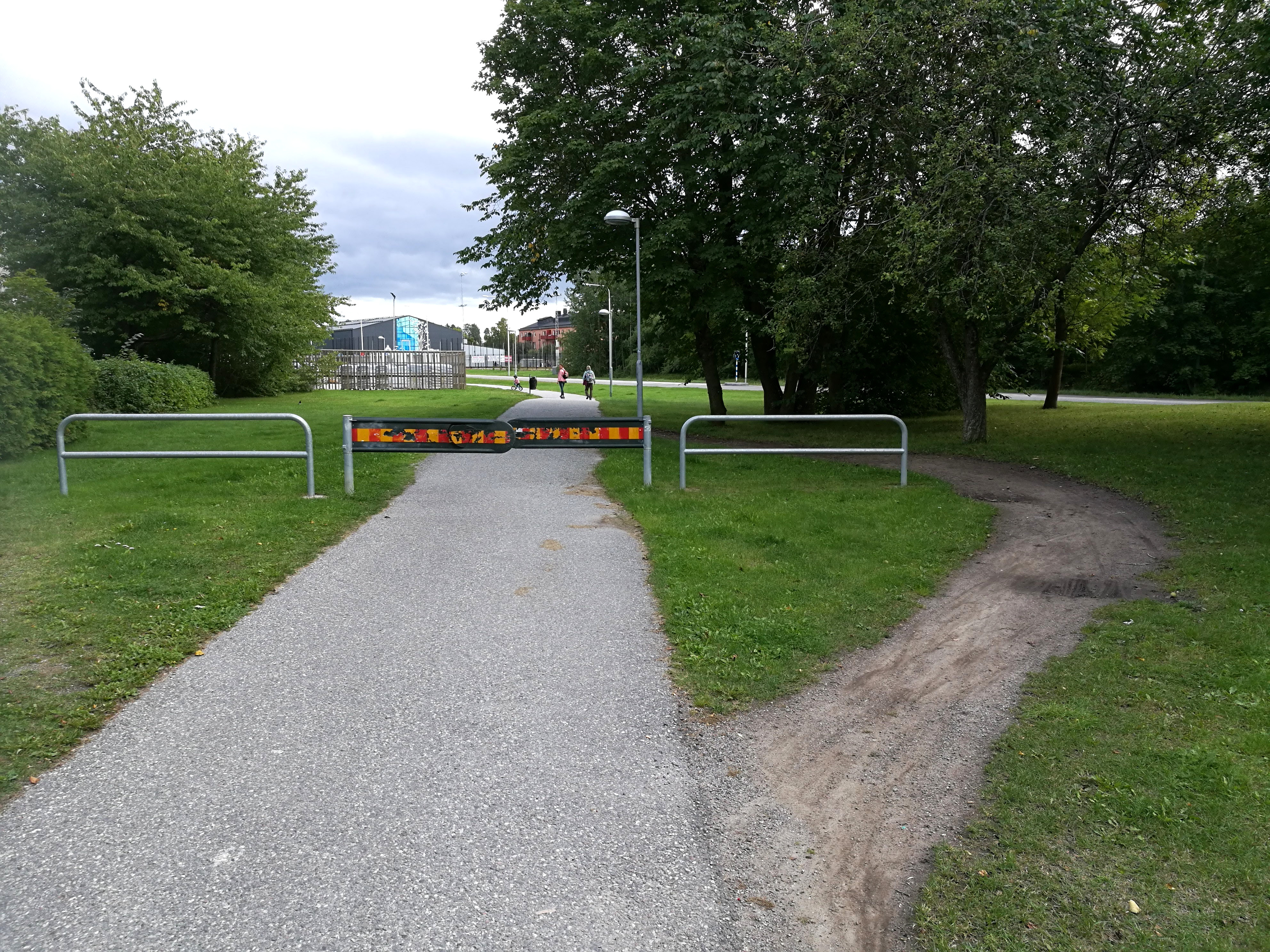
Barriers installed to slow down cyclists have been bypassed by creating a desire path so that they do not have to brake, thus showing a literal example of a workaround and the principle of least effort

The principle of least effort is a broad theory that covers diverse fields from evolutionary biology to webpage design. It postulates that animals, people, and even well-designed machines will naturally choose the path of least resistance or "effort". It is closely related to many other similar principles (see principle of least action or other articles listed below).

This is perhaps best known, or at least documented, among researchers in the field of library and information science. Their principle states that an information-seeking client will tend to use the most convenient search method in the least exacting mode available. Information-seeking behavior stops as soon as minimally acceptable results are found. This theory holds true regardless of the user's proficiency as a searcher, or their level of subject expertise. Also, this theory takes into account the user's previous information-seeking experience. The user will use the tools that are most familiar and easy to use that find results. The principle of least effort is known as a "deterministic description of human behavior".

The principle of least effort applies not only in the library context, but also to any information-seeking activity. For example, one might consult a generalist co-worker down the hall rather than a specialist in another building, so long as the generalist's answers were within the threshold of acceptability.

The principle of least effort is analogous to the path of least resistance.

== History ==
The principle was first articulated by the Italian philosopher Guillaume Ferrero in an article in the Revue philosophique de la France et de l'étranger, 1 January 1894. About fifty years later, this principle was studied by linguist George Kingsley Zipf who wrote Human Behaviour and the Principle of Least Effort: An Introduction to Human Ecology, first published in 1949. He theorised that the distribution of word use was due to tendency to communicate efficiently with least effort and this theory is known as Zipf's law.

Within the context of information seeking, the principle of least effort was studied by Herbert Poole who wrote Theories of the Middle Range in 1985. Librarian Thomas Mann lists the principle of least effort as one of several principles guiding information seeking behavior in his 1987 book, A Guide to Library Research Methods.

Likewise, one of the most common measures of information-seeking behavior, library circulation statistics, also follows the 80-20 rule. This suggests that information-seeking behavior is a manifestation not of a normal distribution curve, but of a power law curve.

== Applications ==
The principle of least effort is especially important when considering design for libraries and research in the context of the modern library. Libraries must take into consideration the user's desire to find information quickly and easily. The principle must be considered when designing individual Online Public Access Catalogs (OPACs) as well as other library tools.

The principle is a guiding force for the push to provide access to electronic media in libraries. The principle of least effort was further explored in a study of library behavior of graduate students by Zao Liu and Zheng Ye (Lan) Lang published in 2004. The study sampled Texas A&M distance learning graduate students to test what library resources they used, and why they used those particular resources. In this study the Internet was used the most, while libraries were the next most used resource for conducting class research. The study found that most students used these resources due to their quickness and ability to access from home. The study found that the principle of least effort was the primary behavior model of most distance learning students. This means that modern libraries, especially academic libraries, need to analyze their electronic databases in order to successfully cater to the needs of the changing realities of information science.

Professional writers employ the principle of least effort during audience analysis. The writer analyzes the reader's environment, previous knowledge, and other similar information which the reader may already know. In technical writing, recursive organization, where parts resemble the organization of the whole, helps readers find their way. Consistency of navigational features is a common concern in software design.

== See also ==
- Systems theory
- Principle of least action
- Principle of least interest
- Fermat's principle (of least time)
- Pareto principle
- The Long Tail
- Parsimony
- Preferential attachment
- Yule-Simon distribution
- Economy (linguistics)
- Constructal law
