= Economy Principle =

Economy principle has multiple meanings:

- Economy Principle (philosophy), another name for Occam's razor
- Economy Principle (linguistics)
