= Lotka's law =

Application of Zipf's law to publications by field

Lotka law for the 15 most populated categories on arXiv (2023-07). It is a log-log plot. The x-axis is the number of publications, and the y-axis is the number of authors with at least that many publications.

Lotka's law, named after Alfred J. Lotka, is one of a variety of special applications of Zipf's law. It describes the frequency of publication by authors in any given field.

== Definition ==
Let $X$ be the number of publications, $Y$ be the percentage of authors with $X$ publications, and $k$ be a constant depending on the specific field. Lotka's law states that $Y \propto X^{-k}$.

In Lotka's original publication, he claimed $k=2$. Subsequent research showed that $k$ varies depending on the discipline.

Equivalently, Lotka's law can be stated as $Y' \propto X^{-(k-1)}$, where $Y'$ is the percentage of authors with at least $X$ publications. Their equivalence can be proved by taking the derivative.

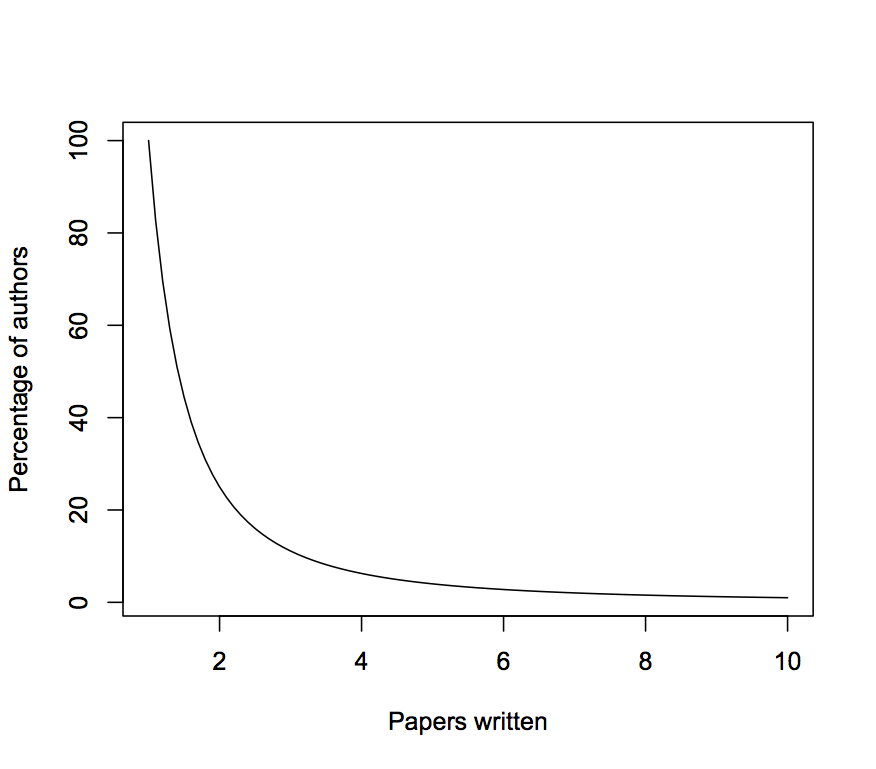
Graphical plot of the Lotka function described in the text, with C=1, n=2

== Example ==
Assume that $k=2$ in a discipline, then as the number of articles published increases, authors producing that many publications become less frequent. There are $1/4$ as many authors publishing two articles within a specified time period as there are single-publication authors, $1/9$ as many publishing three articles, $1/16$ as many publishing four articles, etc.

Thus if we sampled 155 authors, they would have written 294 articles with the following distribution:

Number of articles written	Number of authors writing that number of articles
10	100/10^{2} = 1
9	100/9^{2} ≈ 1 (1.23)
8	100/8^{2} ≈ 2 (1.56)
7	100/7^{2} ≈ 2 (2.04)
6	100/6^{2} ≈ 3 (2.77)
5	100/5^{2} = 4
4	100/4^{2} ≈ 6 (6.25)
3	100/3^{2} ≈ 11 (11.111...)
2	100/2^{2} = 25
1	100

So the 100 least productive authors would write 34% of those articles, with the 55 most productive writing the other 66%.

== Other applications ==
A generalized version of Lotka's Law has been used to model the number of gold disks certified by the Recording Industry Association of America from 1958 to 1989, and was found to be an almost perfect fit to the data.

== Relationship to Riemann Zeta ==
Lotka's law may be described using the Zeta distribution:

$$f(x) =  \frac{1}{\zeta (s)} \cdot \frac{1}{x^s}$$

for $x = 1, 2, 3, 4, \dots$ and where

$$\zeta (s) =  \sum_{x=1}^\infty  \frac{1}{x^s}$$

is the Riemann zeta function. It is the limiting case of Zipf's law where an individual's maximum number of publications is infinite.

== Software ==
- Friedman, A. 2015. "The Power of Lotka’s Law Through the Eyes of R" The Romanian Statistical Review. Published by National Institute of Statistics. ISSN 1018-046X
- B Rousseau and R Rousseau (2000). "LOTKA: A program to fit a power law distribution to observed frequency data". Cybermetrics. 4. ISSN 1137-5019. - Software to fit a Lotka power law distribution to observed frequency data.

== See also ==
- Price's law
- Riemann zeta function
- Zeta distribution
