= Computer chemistry =

Computer chemistry can refer to:

- Computational chemistry
- Mathematical chemistry
- Chemoinformatics
- Computer & Chemistry (journal)
