= Principle of least interest =

Idea in the sociology of relationships

The principle of least interest is the idea in sociology that the person or group that has the least interest in continuing a relationship has the most power over it. In the context of relationship dynamics, it suggests towards which party the balance of power tilts. The principle applies to personal, business, and other types of relationships where more than one party is involved.

== History ==
The term originated in 1938 by the sociologist Willard Waller in his book The Family: A Dynamic Interpretation. Throughout his research Waller found that power in a dating couple is almost never equally distributed between the two participants. One person for any variety of possible reasons will have more power in the relationship. One of the ways Waller proposed for this uneven balance was the Principle of Least Interest. In a relationship with uneven power distribution, one of the partners gets more out of a relationship, be it emotionally, physically, or monetarily than the other. The partner who receives less has less incentive to continue the relationship and therefore at the most extreme can threaten to end the relationship so that the other person bends to their demands. For the person making the demands this is of little consequence to them. For the other party however, it might be a much larger issue. This is the basis for the ideas behind principle of least interest.

The first major study to test the principle came in 1972 in a paper by Kenneth Eslinger, Alfred D Clarke and Russell R Dynes. In the paper the researchers interviewed 113 randomly selected college students that were enrolled in sociology courses to find out if a difference in emotional involvement existed in relationships and whether or not the level of involvement was affected by how the person was raised. The methods of raising children that were considered by the study were: bureaucratically or entrepreneurially. The study confirmed that there was a difference in involvement between how you were raised and how involved in a relationship you were. Furthermore, the study showed a large gap in involvement between males and females, with the lowest female mean score four points higher than the highest male mean score. This showed that males as a group were significantly less interested in maintaining their relationship and could use the principle of least interest for their own benefit.

These studies were further reinforced in 1984 by a study that focused on the balance of power in lesbian relationships. Nearly 40% of those taking part reported an unequal balance of power. Furthermore, those who reported an unequal balance of power reported that they felt the person who was less dependent on the relationship had more power.

In 1994 a study of 413 heterosexual American adults found correlations between the power balance between the partners and the emotional involvement of them to be both negative and significant. The researchers also noted that the perception of being powerless in a relationship grew as the emotional involvements in the relationship grew. 39% of the respondents reported that the woman was more emotionally involved compared to only 21% reporting the man to be more emotionally involved. Building on this study in 2006 a study by Susan Sprecher and Diane Felmlee of 101 heterosexual American dating couples found that the partners who perceived themselves as more emotionally involved also perceived themselves as having less power.

The most recent study on the principle of least interest took place in 2012. In it 30 in-depth interviews with 15 unmarried African-American couples were performed. The study found that the partner less emotionally involved typically made the decisions about how to handle the couple's birth control.

== Sociological perspective ==
The principle of least interest falls primarily in the Conflict viewpoint of sociology. The principle of least interest dictates how power is distributed in a relationship and how it is almost always unequally balanced. This unequal balance of power can lead the weaker person to struggle to get a grasp on some of the power. This struggle leads to a conflict between the one with the power and the one without.

== Outside of relationships ==
While typically the principle of least interest is used in sociology to describe relationships, it has also been used to explain business deals. It can explain why in marketing an excessively aggressive pitch can be less likely to be accepted. Another example is in negotiations, when one party leaves the negotiation in order to make the other party improve their offer.

== See also ==
- Brinkmanship
- Principle of least effort
- Moral hazard
