= Price's law =

Bibliometric hypothesis

Price's law or Price's square root law is a bibliometric hypothesis proposed by Derek J. de Solla Price suggesting that in any scientific field, half of the published research comes from the square root of the total number of authors in that field.

The law specifically states that if n represents the total number of authors in a scientific domain, then √n authors will be responsible for producing approximately 50% of the total publications in that field. For example, if 100 papers are written by 25 authors, then $\sqrt{25}=5$ out of the 25 authors will have contributed 50 papers.

Derek J. de Solla Price introduced this concept in his 1963 book "Little Science, Big Science" as part of his broader research on scientific productivity and information dynamics. The law was intended to describe the uneven distribution of scientific output across researchers.

== Empirical challenges ==
Subsequent research has largely contradicted Price's original hypothesis. Multiple studies across various scientific disciplines have found that the actual distribution of publications is more skewed than Price's law predicted. Most empirical analyses suggest that a much smaller proportion of researchers produce a significantly larger percentage of publications. The related Lotka's law, for example, is a better fit.

== Practical use ==
Despite its empirical limitations, Price's law remains important in various fields, for example to understand scientific productivity patterns, analyze or research output distributions, or highlight the concentration of scientific work among a small number of researchers

== See also ==
- Bibliometrics
- Lotka's law
- Matthew effect
- Pareto principle
