= Jean-Baptiste Estoup =

Jean-Baptiste Estoup (16 January 1868, in Navenne – 17 April 1950, in Paris) was a French stenographer and writer on stenography.

Estoup was General Secretary of the Institut Sténographique de France. In his Gammes sténographiques (3d ed. 1912), he pioneered the investigation of the regularity later known as Zipf's law.
