= Wentian Li =

- Education: Columbia University
- Known for: Bioinformatics, editor of Computational Biology and Chemistry
- Scientific career
- Workplaces: Feinstein Institutes for Medical Research, Northwell Health
- Thesis: Problems in complex systems (1989)

Wentian Li is a bioinformatician. He is co-editor-in-chief of Computational Biology and Chemistry and member of the editorial board of the Journal of Theoretical Biology. Li is an investigator at The Feinstein Institutes for Medical Research.

Li received his BS in Physics from Beijing University in 1982 and PhD in Physics and Complex Systems from Columbia University in 1989.

== Notable Work ==
In 1992 Li published a short paper proving that Zipf's law holds for randomly generated sequences of symbols, when the distribution of strings is ordered by rank.
