= DeLos F. DeTar =

American chemist (1920–2022)

- Born: 1920; Kansas City, Missouri
- Education: University of Illinois Urbana-Champaign; University of Pennsylvania
- Known for: computational chemistry physical organic chemistry

DeLos Fletcher DeTar (1920–2022) was an American chemist known for his work in computational chemistry and physical organic chemistry.

== Early life and education ==
DeTar was born in 1920 in Kansas City, Missouri. He grew up in Elgin, Illinois and attended Elgin High School. After his 1941 graduation from the University of Illinois Urbana-Champaign, where he worked with Carl S. Marvel as an undergraduate, he was accepted to the University of Pennsylvania for graduate work. He completed a Ph.D. in chemistry under the supervision of Marvin Carmack in 1944.

== Career and important contributions ==
After working for a short time with the Dupont Company, he became a lecturer at Cornell University, followed by an eight-year stint at the University of South Carolina (where he helped form their first Ph.D. degree program in chemistry). In 1961 he joined the chemistry department at Florida State University, where he remained until retiring in 1988.

During his career, DeTar wrote or co-authored 498 peer-reviewed publications in the areas of physical organic chemistry and computational chemistry between 1941 and 2007. His most cited papers were focused on reaction mechanisms and the properties of conformationally flexible molecules. In 1976, he became the founding editor of the journal Computers and Chemistry (now known as Computational Biology and Chemistry).

Although DeTar retired his faculty position and was given the title of Professor Emeritus in 1988, he was prolific in retirement and subsequently published 95 more papers; his last was published in 2007, in the Journal of Physical Chemistry A.

== Awards and honors ==
DeTar was elected a fellow of the American Association for the Advancement of Science in 1983. He also was recognized with the Florida Award by the Florida section of the American Chemical Society in 1987.

== Personal life ==
DeTar married Francis Patty Livesay in 1943. Together they had four children (Carleton, Caroline, Marvin, and Martha). Carleton was a professor of physics at the University of Utah, and published at least one article together with his father. The DeTars were founding members of the Unitarian Universalist Association in Columbia, South Carolina and became active members of the Tallahassee congregation. Patty died in 2003 after sixty years of marriage; DeTar then married Karlene Losey Sabin, who died in 2012.
