= Economy (linguistics) =

Functional explanation of linguistic form

The economy principle in linguistics, also known as linguistic economy, is a functional explanation of linguistic form. It suggests that the organization of phonology, morphology, lexicon and syntax is fundamentally based on a compromise between simplicity and clarity, two desirable but to some extent incompatible qualities. The more distinctive elements that a language has, for example phonemes or functional markers, the more it will promote hearer-easiness. This, however, occurs on the expense of the speaker, who must make a greater effort to convey a message. An economic solution yields good communicative value without excessive time and energy costs.

The word 'economy' derives from Greek oikòs ('house') and nomòs (from némein, 'to deliver'). The notion of good household management is transferred metaphorically from a social to a linguistic level where it represents a force maintaining systemic equilibrium. The same principle—a compromise between gain and cost—also applies to biological systems. However, functional linguistics does not consider itself to be a part of evolutionary biology, but both as belonging to systems theory, and both as being governed by the logic of trade-off. In linguistics, the economy principle suggests that language change cannot make languages exceedingly difficult to produce or process, predicting that the constant changes that are natural to language, despite appearing to have a deteriorating effect, ultimately do not make languages less suited for intercommunication.

== Definitions ==
The standard concept of economy, or, the "classical definition", was published by André Martinet in his Économie des changements phonétiques (1955). Martinet studied the manifestations of economy in phonology and syntax and defined it as the unstable balance between the needs of communication—which are always changing—and natural human inertia, two essential forces contributing to the optimization of the linguistic system.

Previous definitions included the principle of least effort as discussed by Joseph Vendryes (1939) and George Kingsley Zipf (1949). Two contradicting principles of 'economy' were first recognized by Henry Sweet (1888). By contrast, William Dwight Whitney (1875) had discussed linguistic economy before him, but only as relates to the single principle of parsimony. Georg von der Gabelentz (1901) did not use the term but identified two conflicting desiderata in grammar: comfort of the speaker, and clarity, which favors the addressee. Other terms for economy include competing motivations, the homeostatic principle, and the mechanical principle (William Labov). Another similar concept is Martin Haspelmath's form–frequency correspondence, which argues that more frequent forms are unmarked and therefore shorter than less frequent forms, which are marked and longer. These premises create "a balance between parsimony and clarity", promoting efficiency of communication in terms of production and processing.

=== Other uses ===
The word economy has been used in different ways in linguistics and sometimes only refers to parsimony (or notational parsimony, e.g., Louis Hjelmslev). Grammatical efficiency (John A. Hawkins) is another single-principle concept relating to sentence processing; and economy in generative grammar refers simultaneously to notational parsimony and syntactic processing. In John Haiman's competing motivations of economy and iconicity, economy alone is the single principle of parsimony and, thus, distinct from Martinet's economy.

== Empirical evidence ==
A review of studies carried out in diachronic and sociolinguistics found that, while language change is frequently the matter of the deletion of word endings, for example—which often contain grammatical elements—a disambiguation across the linguistic levels is also taking place. Despite being critical of functionalism, Labov considered these two opposing forces as indispensable to explain meaning-preservation in linguistic change. He named three subtypes of meaning-preservation.

- Avoidance of homonymy at the lexical-phonological level.
- A tendency to increase transparency of derivation; and,
- Regularization of paradigms at the morphosyntactic level.

However, Labov points out that meaning-preservation does not necessarily employ push-chains and pull-chains (as it did in the great vowel shift, for instance) and that functional decay is commonplace in language change. Much of the disambiguation occurs indirectly as a reaction to an already occurred change that has increased ambiguity. Children, when learning their language, perform a reanalysis of it based on their experiences of misunderstanding and are inclined to reject the old form that is homonymous with the new form. According to historical linguist Anthony Kroch,

"If the progress of an earlier change, like the loss of case marking, leads to a greater tendency for the older form to be misunderstood, no matter how small the tendency, there will be a gradual shift, generation after generation, toward the newer form."

This explains, for example, why the loss of grammatical cases did not make English more ambiguous.

== Criticism ==
In the context of a long-lasting descriptivism versus prescriptivism debate, there has been much skepticism of logical and functional arguments, the latter of which are defined as arguments utilizing prescriptive norms “to avoid ambiguity, misunderstanding, redundancy, etc.”. The problem, according to sociolinguists James Milroy and Lesley Milroy, is that non-linguists participating in the social construction of the linguistic norm are not sufficiently informed about the discriminatory aspects of standardization based on such purportedly objective criteria. The evaluation of what is acceptable in language should therefore be left to the professionals, who employ research-based criteria. It is widely accepted among academic linguists that descriptive linguistics is the scientific enterprise that guides educational authorities to the correct policies, resulting in greater social equality.

In theoretical linguistics, Labov is critical of the idea that functional change is based on the speech community's desire to improve their language. Therefore, he proposes renaming the force of maintaining meaning as a "mechanical" principle, reflecting the subconscious nature of language change.

William Croft argues that the whole concept of the functionality of the language system, including economy, is mistaken because language is an autonomous function of the mind and immune to the external factors of communication. According to Croft, the time span of linguistic change is longer than the life of an individual, so he or she cannot be responsible for it. Conversely to Labov, Croft proposes maintaining the term functional explanation but redefining it as an argument against the idea that "form follows function".

== See also ==
- Brevity law
- Functional linguistics
- Diachronic linguistics
- Theory of language
