= John Yule (botanist) =

Scottish physician

Dr John Yule MD FRSE FRCPE MWS (1762–1827) was an 18th/19th century Scottish physician remembered as a botanist. He specialised in conifers and was the first to academically differentiate larch, spruce and fir.

== Life ==
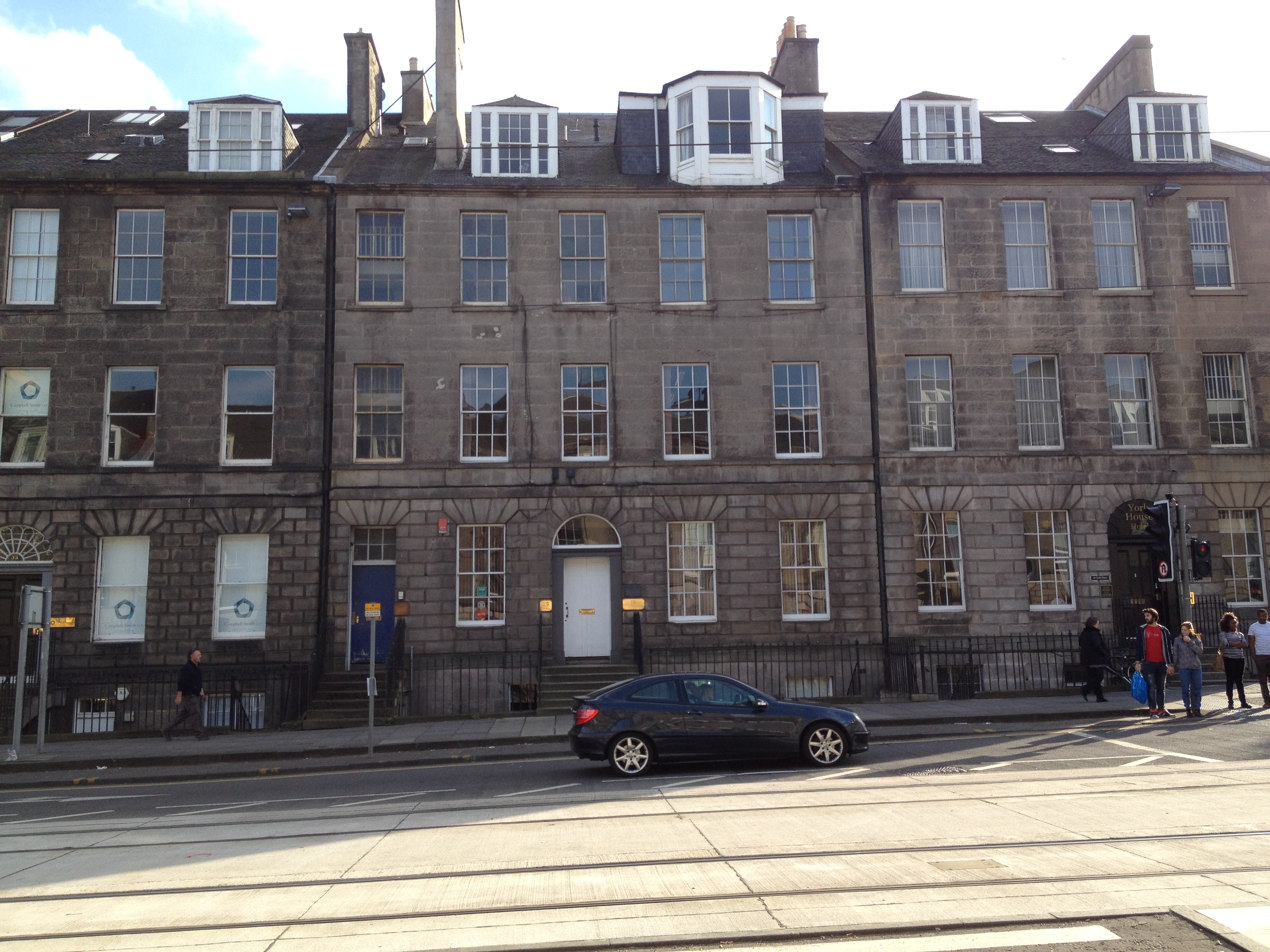
23 York Place, Edinburgh (centre)

He was born in 1762 the son of Elizabeth Rose and George Yule, who were tenant farmers at Gibslees close by Fenton Tower near Dirleton in Haddingtonshire, where his family had been resident for centuries. He was baptised at Dirleton on 27 Sep 1762.

He studied medicine at the University of Edinburgh gaining his doctorate (MD) in 1785. After qualifying he worked in Sheffield for several years before returning to Edinburgh around 1800. He was one of the earliest corresponding members of the Society of Antiquaries of Scotland during his time in Sheffield.

In 1798 he was elected a member of the Harveian Society of Edinburgh. In 1801 he was living on Nicolson Street in Edinburgh's South side.

In 1815 he was elected a Fellow of the Royal Society of Edinburgh. His proposers were Sir George Steuart Mackenzie, Thomas Allan, and Alexander Christison. He was then living at 23 York Place.

He died at home 23 York Place on 23 February 1827, and was buried in the churchyard of the parish church at Dirleton.

== Publications ==
- The Aspect of the Proper Pines (1820)

== Family ==
Relatives of John Yule include his nephew, the orientalist Henry Yule, and his great-nephew, the statistician Udny Yule.
