= Henry Yule =

Scottish Orientalist and geographer (1820–1889)

Colonel Sir Henry Yule KCSI CB FRSGS
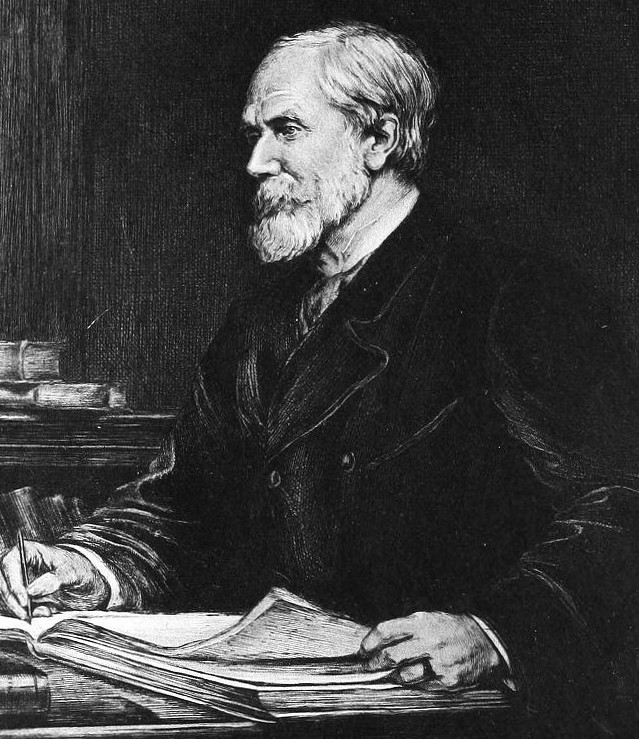
- Born: 1 May 1820; Inveresk, East Lothian, Scotland
- Died: 30 December 1889 (aged 69); Earl's Court, London, England
- Education: Addiscombe Military Seminary
- Occupations: Orientalist, geographer
- Notable work: Hobson-Jobson (1886)
- Awards: Companion of the Order of the Bath (1863); Royal Geographical Society's Founder's Medal (1872); Knight Commander of the Order of the Star of India (1889)

Colonel Sir Henry Yule (1 May 1820 – 30 December 1889) was a Scottish Orientalist and geographer. He published many travel books, including translations of the works of Marco Polo and of the Mirabilia Descripta by the 14th-century Dominican Friar Jordanus. He was also the compiler of a dictionary of Anglo-Indian terms, the Hobson-Jobson, with Arthur Coke Burnell.

== Early life ==
Henry Yule was born at Inveresk near Edinburgh in Scotland on 1 May 1820. He was the youngest son of Major William Yule (1764–1839) and his wife Elizabeth Paterson (died circa 1827). William Yule had served as an officer in the Bengal army of the East India Company and had retired in 1806. William's uncle was the botanist John Yule FRSE.

Elizabeth died before Henry was eight and William moved to Edinburgh with his sons, where Henry attended the Royal High School. In 1833, he was sent to be coached by the Reverend Henry Hamilton at his rectory in the village of Wath near Ripon in North Yorkshire. When Hamilton moved to Cambridge in the following year Yule was transferred to the care of the Reverend James Challis, at Papworth Everard near Cambridge. The other resident pupils were John Neale and Harvey Goodwin. (Neale co-founded the Society of Saint Margaret, an order of women in the Church of England dedicated to nursing the sick, while Goodwin became Bishop of Carlisle.) Yule's stay at Papworth Everard ended in 1826 when Challis was appointed Plumian Professor of Astronomy and moved to the Observatory in Cambridge.

After a brief period at University College London, Yule entered the East India Military College at Addiscombe near Croydon (1837–8), followed by the Royal Engineers Establishment at Chatham, Kent. He obtained his commission in December 1838, and joined the Bengal Engineers in 1840.

Both of Henry's brothers worked in India. The eldest, George Udny Yule (1813–1886), worked in the Bengal civil service. The other brother, Robert (1817–1857), died near Delhi during the Indian Rebellion. The statistician Udny Yule was the son of George and thus the nephew of Henry.

Henry was interested in Arabic and Persian literature and collected early manuscripts. These were later donated by his sons to the British Museum. He translated the Apothegms of Ali the son of Abu Talib (referring to Ali, the successor to Mohammed, the prophet of Islam; the obscure English word "apothegm" refers to short pithy sayings, see hadith.)

== India ==
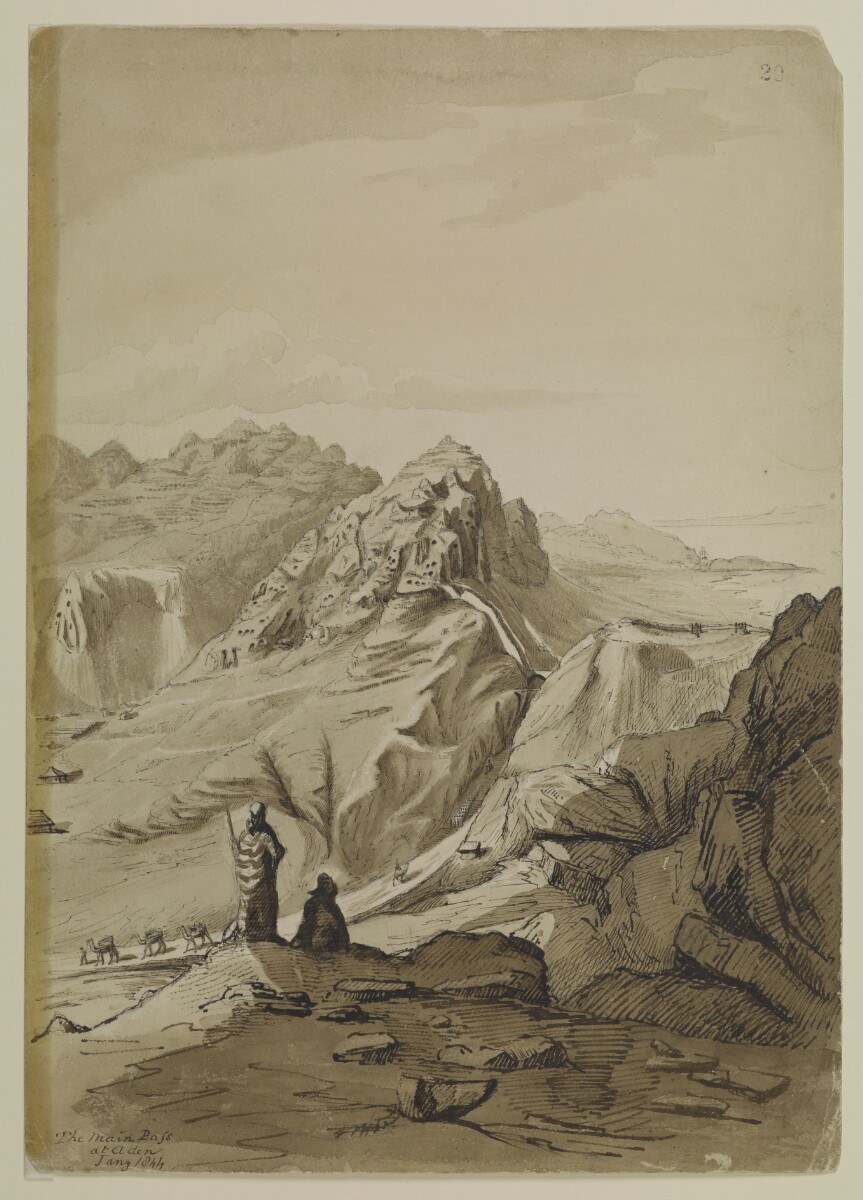
The main pass, Aden by Yule, drawn in January 1844 during his return journey to India

Yule arrived in Calcutta at the end of 1840. His first posting was in the Khasi Hills, an area to the northeast of Bengal in the modern state of Meghalaya. His mission was to establish a practical method of transporting coal to the plains. In this he was unsuccessful but he became fascinated by the region and wrote an account of its people, including the first written description of their living root bridges. In 1842 he was transferred to a team of engineers led by Captain (later General) William Baker charged with the construction of irrigation canals. Their headquarters were at Karnal, 130 km (81 mi) to the north of Delhi.

He returned to England in 1843 and married his cousin Anna Maria (died 1875), daughter of Major-General Martin White of the Bengal Infantry (died 1856). In November 1843 she accompanied him back to India but returned owing to ill health. He was appointed to a committee charged with investigating the relationship between irrigation by the proposed Ganges Canal and its impact on public health in the area. He served in both the Sikh wars (1845–1846 and 1848–1849). In 1849 he took three years of extended leave and returned to live in Edinburgh with his wife. He lectured at the Scottish Naval and Military Academy and wrote a volume on fortifications (1851).

A daughter, Amy, was born in 1852 and shortly after her birth, Yule returned to Bengal. He worked in Arakan and Burma and was put in charge of a new railway system. This was interrupted by a posting as a secretary to Colonel Arthur Phayre's mission to Ava, Burma, in 1855. In 1858 he published his account of this journey, Narrative of the Mission to the Court of Ava with illustrations. The 1857 rebellion made his life difficult, and although Yule was close to the governor generals Lord Dalhousie and Lord Canning, he lost interest in his work.

== Retirement in Europe ==
Yule retired in 1862, and Canning's death in that year made it difficult for him to find any official appointment in London. In 1863 he was created a Companion of the Order of the Bath through the influence of Sir Roderick Murchison. He devoted his leisure to the medieval history and geography of Central Asia. His wife became unwell, and they crossed Europe to settle in Palermo, Sicily. He made use of the richly stocked public libraries there during this period. He published Cathay and the Way Thither (1866), and the Book of Marco Polo (1871), for which he received the Founder's Medal of the Royal Geographical Society the following year. After his wife's death in 1875, Yule returned to England, where he was appointed to the Council of India. Yule remarried in 1877, his new wife Mary Wilhelmina (died 26 April 1881) the daughter of a Bengal civil servant, Fulwar Skipwith.

Yule was a member, and from 1877 to 1889 President, of the Hakluyt Society. He was also vice-president of the Royal Geographical Society (1887–9), and would have become a president but for a protest that he led along with Henry Hyndman against Henry Morton Stanley. The Society wanted to welcome Stanley but Yule stood against the violent methods used in Africa. One of his heroes, on the other hand, was Garnet Wolseley, 1st Viscount Wolseley.

For the Hakluyt Society, Yule edited the Mirabilia Descripta (1863), a translation of the travels of the 14th century Friar Jordanus, and The Diary of William Hedges (3 vols, 1887–89). The latter contains a biography of Governor Pitt, grandfather of William Pitt, 1st Earl of Chatham. He contributed introductions to Nikolay Przhevalsky's Mongolia (1876) and Captain William Gill's The River of Golden Sand (1880). He wrote biographical notes for the Royal Engineers' Journal, and many geographical entries in the Encyclopædia Britannica.

Yule's most popular work, compiled with Arthur C. Burnell, was the Hobson-Jobson (1886), a historical dictionary of Anglo-Indian words and phrases which continues to provide an insight into the language used in British India.

Yule died at his home at 3 Penywern Road, Earls Court, London, on 30 December 1889 aged 69, and is buried at Tunbridge Wells.

== Awards ==
Yule was awarded an honorary doctorate (LL.D.) from Edinburgh University in 1884 and served as royal commissioner for the Colonial and Indian Exhibition of 1886. He was created Knight Commander of the Order of the Star of India in 1889. In 1889, he was made a Fellow of the Royal Scottish Geographical Society (FRSGS).

== Selected publications ==
For a full list see Cordier & Yule (1903).

- Yule, Henry (1842). "Notes on the iron of the Khasia Hills, for the Museum of Economic Geography". Journal of the Asiatic Society of Bengal. 11 Part 2, Jul–Dec (129): 853–857.
- Yule, Henry (1844). "Notes on the Khasia Hills, and people". Journal of the Asiatic Society of Bengal. 14 Part 2, Jul–Dec (152): 612–631.
- Yule, Henry (1851). Fortification for Officers of the Army and Students of Military History. Edinburgh: William Blackwood & Sons.
- Yule, Henry (1858). A Narrative of the Mission sent by the Governor-General of India to the Court of Ava in 1855, with Notices of the Country, Government, and People. London: Smith, Elder & Co.
- Yule, Henry, ed. and trans. (1863). Mirabilia Descripta: the wonders of the East. London: Hakluyt Society.
- Yule, Henry, ed. (1866). Cathay and the Way Thither: being a collection of medieval notices of China. London: Hakluyt Society. (2 volumes). Scans from Google: Volume 1, Volume 2. Scans from the Digital Silk Road Project: Volume 1, Volume 2
- Yule, Henry, ed. (1871). The Book of Ser Marco Polo. London: John Murray. Volume 1, Volume 2.
- Yule, Henry, ed. (1887–1889). The Diary of William Hedges, Esq. (afterwards Sir William Hedges), during his Agency in Bengal: as well as on his voyage out and return overland (1681–1697). London: Hakluyt Society. Volume 1; Volume 2; Volume 3 William Hedges was an administrator of the East India Company
- Yule, Henry; Burnell, A. C. (1903) [1886]. Hobson-Jobson: A glossary of colloquial Anglo-Indian words and phrases, and of kindred terms, etymological, historical, geographical and discursive. William Crooke ed. London: J. Murray. (Searchable database)

Editions revised by Henri Cordier

- Yule, Henry; Cordier, Henri, eds. (1903). The Book of Ser Marco Polo (3rd ed.). London: John Murray. (2 volumes). Volume 1; Volume 2. Scans from the Digital Silk Road Project: Volume 1 Volume 2.
- Yule, Henry; Cordier, Henri, eds. (1915). Cathay and the Way Thither: being a collection of medieval notices of China (2nd ed.). London: Hakluyt Society. (4 volumes). Volume 1; Volume 2; Volume 3; Volume 4.

Contributions

- Yule, Henry (1872). "The geography and history of the upper waters of the Oxus". In Wood, John (ed.). A Journey to the Source of the River Oxus (2nd ed.). London: Murray. pp. xxi–xci.
- Przhevalskii, Nikolai Mikhailovich (1876). Mongolia, the Tangut Country, and the Solitudes of Northern Tibet, being a Narrative of Three Years' Travel in Eastern High Asia. Morgan, E. Delmar (translator), Yule, Henry (Introduction and Notes ). London: S. Low, Marston, Searle, & Rivington. (2 volumes). Volume 1, Volume 2. The travels of Nikolay Przhevalsky.

== Sources ==
- Baker, W. E.; Dempster, T. E.; Yule, H. (1868). The Prevalence of Organic Disease of the Spleen as a Test for Detecting Malarious Localities in Hot Climates: being the report of a committee assembled by general orders Commander-in-Chief, dated the 16th September 1854. Calcutta: Office of the Superintendent of Government Printing.
- Cordier, H.; Yule, A. F. (1903). "A bibliography of Sir Henry Yule's writings". In Yule, Henry (ed.). The Book of Ser Marco Polo, the Venetian concerning the Kingdoms and Marvels of the East (3rd ed.). London: John Murray. pp. lxxv–lxxxii.
- Driver, Felix (2004). "Yule, Sir Henry (1820–1889)". Oxford Dictionary of National Biography (online ed.). Oxford University Press. doi:10.1093/ref:odnb/30291. (Subscription, Wikipedia Library access or UK public library membership required.)
- Vibart, H. M. (1894). Addiscombe: its heroes and men of note. London: Archibald Constable. pp. 487–490. OL 23336661M.
- Yule, Amy Frances (1903). "Memoir of Sir Henry Yule". In Yule, Henry; Cordier, Henri (eds.). The book of Ser Marco Polo, the Venetian concerning the kingdoms and marvels of the East (3rd ed.). London: John Murray. pp. xxvii–lxxi.
