= Little Science, Big Science =

Book by Derek J. de Solla Price

- Author: Derek J. De Solla Price
- Language: English
- Genre: Non-fiction
- Publisher: Columbia University Press
- Publication date: 1963
- Publication place: United States

Little Science, Big Science is a book of collected lectures given by Derek J. De Solla Price, first published in 1963. The book presents the 1962 Brookhaven National Laboratory Pegram Lectures, a series of lectures dedicated to discussing science and its place in society. Price's goal in the lectures is to outline what it may look like for science to be analysed scientifically, by applying methods of measuring, hypothesizing, and deriving to science itself. With this goal in mind, he sets out to define quasi-mathematically how the shape and size of science has shifted from "small science" to "big science" in a historical and sociological way. Price presents a quantification of science as a measurable entity via an analogy to thermodynamics, conceptualizing science like a gas with individual molecules possessing individual velocities and interactions, a total volume, and general properties or laws.

== Prologue to a Science of Science ==
Price begins the lectures by setting forth a demarcation in science centered around the modern period. He describes the phenomenon that, at the time of the lectures, 80 to 90 percent of important scientific work had occurred in one normal human life span. With this facet in mind, he sets out to describe the development of the term "Big Science," as coined by Alvin M. Weinberg in 1961. As a general directive, he seeks to show that the transition from "Little Science" to "Big Science," specifically the socio-economic and methodological changes to science in the 20th century, have been mostly gradual. To illustrate this point, he presents empirical statistical evidence from various aspects and fields of science, all of which show that the mode of growth of science is exponential, growing at compound interest. This assertion Price claims is the "fundamental law of any analysis of science," stating that it even holds accurately over long time periods. With this fundamental law in mind, he states that for general measures the size of science in manpower or number of publications doubles in size every 10 to 15 years. If this rate of expansion is considered broadly, then from the 1600s until now such size measures of science have increased by a factor of 10^{6}. From this observation, Price moves to describe the "coefficient of immediacy:" the number of scientists alive compared to the number of scientists who have ever been, a ratio or percentage he states as 7:8 and 87.5% respectively. This measure serves to show numerically how the majority of important science has taken place within the average human life span at the time of the lecture presentation. As a result of the consistent exponential growth rate and immediacy of science, the statement that the majority of scientists throughout history are alive at any given moment must be consistent throughout history as well, meaning that in 1700 the majority of all scientists ever were alive, true also for 1800 and 1900 and so on. As a result of this facet, Price states that science has been constantly exploding into the population, increasing its size at a rate faster than the increase of total humans able to conduct it.

However, Price asserts that this exponential growth rate cannot simply explain the transition from "Little Science" to "Big Science," as the constant growth would not make the modern period under question any more likely to produce "Big Science" than any other. He conjectures that two statistical phenomena hold true for science generally, that individual metrics of science may grow at rates different from that of the exponential growth, and that the exponential growth rate may be starting to diminish. In response to his second point, he claims that the normal exponential growth may give way to a logistic growth rate, growing exponentially until it reaches a maximum size and then ceasing to grow. The possibility that science follows a rate of growth modeled by a logistic curve is suggested further by the fact that if science had continued to grow at an exponential rate in 1962, then by now there would be more scientists than people. With his claim that the growth rate actually observes a logistic curve, he provides a second basic law of the analysis of science, namely that the exponential growth rates previously mentioned must be in fact logistic. If this claim is correct, then the exponential growth rate previously observed must break down at a point in the future, and Price implies as a conclusion to this section that the onset of this breakdown may be associated with an upper bound to the size of science brought on by "Big Science."

== Galton Revisited ==
In this chapter, Price suggests various ideas and methods about conducting a science of science, or scientometrics, by first narrating some peculiar contributions to statistics made by Francis Galton. His overall goal is to further the possibility of applying scientific methods to science itself by suggesting various metrics and measures of the size, growth rate, and distribution of science. He focuses on Galton's work concerning the distribution of high achieving scientists and statesmen in the upper echelons of British society, specifically Hereditary Genius and English Men of Science. These works are reviewed with the goal of understanding a basic metric for the number of people or papers in science that reach different levels of quality, an idea basic in Price's formulation of scientometrics. Further, he suggests that understanding such a metric would allow predictions to be made of science and scientists when changes associated with Big Science arrive. Galton's original approach was to estimate the distribution of high achieving practitioners of science among the eminent parts of British society, and Price takes this as a starting step in grasping a scientific metric of the productivity of science. In analyzing Galton's work and the work of another statistics researcher, Alfred J. Lotka, Price suggests that there may be a rough inverse-square law of productivity. Price moves next to define a quantity he calls someone's "solidness" s, as the logarithm of the total papers published in one scientist's life. Keeping in mind the previous productivity law, for each unit increase in a scientist's solidness, the total number of scientists of that solidness decreases at a constant rate. With these two observations, among others, Price asserts that the foundations for an econometric-like study of science have been suggested, with the analysis of time series suggesting exponential or logistic growth and the distribution law of scientific productivity comprising them. He concludes by suggesting that these distributions and analyses contain errors relating to the non-uniform distribution of scientists across populations, noting that they tend to congregate in certain fields, institutions, countries, and journals. In keeping with his gas analogy, he maintains that just as one cannot measure the exact positions and velocities of gas molecules, one cannot pinpoint the exact productivity or contribution levels of individual scientists within science.

== Invisible Colleges and the Affluent Scientific Commuter ==
This chapter serves multiple purposes but overall achieves the same goal as the previous, providing a further conception of the productivity measure in science. This conclusion is reached through defining historically, sociologically, and from a communications perspective what a scientific paper is for, specifically what the purpose of this form of scientific communication is. To begin this analysis, he begins by looking at the history of the scientific paper, tracing its original purpose to discovering what was of interest within scientific practice. With the emergence of this scientific social practice, seen not as a means of publishing new knowledge but of communication between practitioners, the process of situating papers within the general body of literature came in to play. Specifically, each scientific paper is built from the foundation created by all previous papers, and with this facet exists a possibility of quantifying this foundation, the citation of references. With the idea that scientific papers were a social device of scientific communication, Price suggests that the driving force behind their emergent usage was the ability to assert and claim intellectual property within science. The possibility of communicating priority in disputes over scientific discoveries promoted the scientific paper as the best means of communication, leaving the information dissemination quality of papers as incidental in their overall purpose. With the quantification of scientific productivity by citation number and rate, there arrives a metric in science that gives the scientific importance of an individual's work or journal as its total usage within scientific practice, its total citations or references in other papers or journals. With this in mind, Price observes the fact that the total number of scientific references at a specific date across science is proportional to the total literature available within science at that date.

Moving from the ability of scientific papers to facilitate communication and interactions between scientists, Price outlines an idea that allows further maximization of interactions between scientists. His term for this organizational method is the "invisible college," specifically the circuit of institutions, research centers, journals, and conferences that allow intermingling and interactions within specific fields of science. Groups of scientists naturally form as a result of collaborations between individuals focusing on similar problems, but the ability for researchers to move around the globe in order to achieve interpersonal relationships with their fellow researchers is what Price suggests maximizes the group size able to keep up regular productive interactions. Thus Price defines the sociological structure of scientific practice communicating through published papers.

== Political Strategy for Big Scientists ==
The final section of the lectures focuses on a larger-picture analysis of science and the monetary trends within it. As a general first statement, Price proposes that the cost of science has been increasing proportional to the square of the number of scientists. He points out that the cost of research in terms of the GDP did not increase in the years preceding World War II, yet afterward began increasing at the rate previously mentioned. As research amounts increase, the current and necessary number of researchers increases, promoting the inducement of scientists with higher salaries and better facilities in turn increasing the overall costs of science. Price suggests that it is this feedback loop that is a potential decelerator for the growth of science, and the main difference between Little Science and Big Science. What follows is his analysis of the "explosion of science" within non-developed countries, specifically Japan. He shows through this analysis that the United States' lack of experience of this explosion of science within the 20th century up to this point is due to the saturation of society with the activities of science, nearing costs not maintainable by the country. In countries where science has not yet reached an exponential growth curve, this saturation is not present, which allows the growth rate to set out at an exponential pace.

The final conceptual measure that Price offers is the idea of the "mavericity" of a scientist, or the likelihood that an individual will test new and unique combinations of theories and experiments unexpected in the current literature. The reactions and interactions within science to this mavericity also characterizes Big Science over Little Science, where the former serves to limit and restrain the most maverick investigators due to collaborative work and specific directed goals for scientific research. Thus the emergence of Big Science not only influences the growth rate, connectedness, and significance of science, but also the individual facets of the scientific pursuit.
