= Jeanne Martinet =

French semiotician (1920–2018)

Jeanne Martinet (March 24, 1920 – November 6, 2018) was a French semiotician and a proprietor of a semiotics school. Her husband was the linguist André Martinet (1908–1999). In 1973, in Paris, Martinet published the book Clefs pour la sémiologie, which has been translated into numerous languages. In 1993, she co-authored, with her husband, the volume Mémoires d'un linguiste.

Martinet was born in March 1920.

Although her husband was Research Director of the International Auxiliary Language Association (IALA) from 1946 to 1948, she became involved with Interlingua only in 1997, when a group of interviewers including Alix Potet spoke with the couple in their home. Jeanne Martinet participated in the Jubilee Interlingua Conference in Poland in 2001, the 8th Nordic Meeting in Sweden in 2002, the 16th International Interlingua Conference in Bulgaria in 2003, the 9th Nordic Meeting in Sweden in 2004, and the 17th International Interlingua Conference in Sweden in 2005.

In 2002, she was elected President of the Union Interlinguiste de France. The same year, she traveled to Guadeloupe to deliver the presentation "Créole et interlingua" at the conference of the International Society of Functional Linguistics. In 2005, she presented "L'interlingua et la linguistique fonctionnelle" to the society in Helsinki, Finland. Martinet died in November 2018 at the age of 98.
