= Computational Biology and Chemistry =

- Discipline: Computational biology and chemistry
- Language: English
- Edited by: Wentian Li, Donald Hamelberg

Publication details
- Former names: Computers & Chemistry
- History: 1976–present
- Publisher: Elsevier
- Frequency: 7/year
- Impact factor: 3.1 (2024)

Standard abbreviations
- ISO 4: Comput. Biol. Chem.

Indexing
- CODEN: CBCOCH
- ISSN: 1476-9271
- LCCN: 2003252370
- OCLC no.: 643939876

Links
- Journal homepage; Online access

Computational Biology and Chemistry is a peer-reviewed scientific journal published by Elsevier covering all areas of computational life sciences. The current editors-in-chief are Wentian Li (The Feinstein Institutes for Medical Research) and Donald Hamelberg (Georgia State University). The journal was established in 1976 as Computers & Chemistry, with DeLos F. DeTar (Florida State University) as its first editor. It obtained its current title in 2003 under the editorship of Andrzej K Konopka and James Crabble (University of Bedfordshire).

== Abstracting and indexing ==
The journal is abstracted and indexed in:

- BIOSIS
- Cambridge Scientific Abstracts
- Chemical Abstracts
- Current Contents
- EMBiology
- Engineering Index
- Inspec
- MEDLINE
- MathSciNet
- PASCAL
- Science Citation Index
- Scopus

According to ScienceDirect, the journal had a 2024 impact factor of 3.1 and a CiteScore of 4.3. It was ranked 52nd out of 102 journals in the category "Computer Science, Interdisciplinary Applications".
