= André Martinet =

French linguist (1908–1999)

- Born: 12 April 1908; Saint-Alban-des-Villards, French Third Republic
- Died: 16 July 1999 (aged 91); Châtenay-Malabry, France
- Known for: Work on linguistic economy and double articulation
- Scientific career
- Fields: linguistics
- Institutions: École pratique des hautes études; Columbia University; University of Paris

André Martinet (French: [ɑ̃.dʁe maʁ.ti.nɛ]; 12 April 1908 – 16 July 1999) was a French linguist, influential due to his work on structural linguistics. In linguistic theory, Martinet is known especially for his studies on linguistic economy and double articulation.

== Life and work ==
Martinet passed his agrégation in English and received his doctorate after submitting, as is traditional in France, two theses: La gémination consonantique d'origine expressive dans les langues germaniques and La phonologie du mot en danois. From 1938 to 1946 he served as a director of studies of the École pratique des hautes études (EPHE). After World War II he moved to New York City, where he remained until 1955.

In New York, he directed the International Auxiliary Language Association up to the end of 1948 and taught at Columbia University, where he served as chair of the department from 1947 to 1955. Also, he became editor of Word, a linguistics journal. In 1955, he returned to his position at EPHE and took up a chair in general linguistics at the Sorbonne, and then at Paris V. He continued to be active professionally by serving as president of the European Linguistic Society and founding both the Society for Functional Linguistics and the journal La Linguistique.

The Prague School of linguistics was one of Martinet's main influences, and he is known for pioneering a functionalist approach to syntax, which led to a violent polemic with Noam Chomsky. He wrote over twenty books on topics ranging from historical linguistics (Économie des changements phonétiques, 1955) to general linguistic theory. His most widely known work, Elements of General Linguistics (1960) has been translated into 17 languages and has influenced a generation of students, both in France and abroad.

Other works include General Syntax (1985), The Function and Dynamics of Language (1989), and an intellectual autobiography entitled Memories of a Linguist and the Life of Language.

== Personal life ==
Martinet was married twice:

- To Karen Martinet (née Mikkelsen Sørensen)
- To Jeanne Martinet (née Allard).

== Publications ==
- La gémination consonantique d'origine expressive dans les langues germaniques, Copenhague, Munksgaard, 1937.
- La phonologie du mot en danois, Paris, Klincksieck, 1937.
- La prononciation du français contemporain, Paris, Droz, 1945.
- Économie des changements phonétiques, Berne, Francke, 1955.
- La description phonologique avec application au parler francoprovençal d'Hauteville (Savoie), coll. « Publication romanes et françaises », Genève, Librairie Droz, 1956.
- Éléments de linguistique générale, Paris, Armand Colin, 1960.
- Langue et fonction, 1962.
- La linguistique synchronique, Paris, Presses universitaires de France, 1965.
- Le français sans fard, coll. « Sup », Paris, PUF, 1969.
- André Martinet, Langue et Fonction, Paris : Denoël, 1969, ©1962.
- Studies in Functional Syntax, München, Wilhelm Fink Verlag, 1975.
- Évolution des langues et reconstruction, Paris, PUF, 1975.
- Syntaxe générale, 1985.
- Des steppes aux océans, Paris, Payot, 1986.
- Fonction et dynamique des langues, Paris, Armand Colin, 1989.
- Mémoires d'un linguiste, vivre les langues, Paris, Quai Voltaire, 1993 (with G. Kassai and J. Martinet).

== See also ==
- Double articulation
