= Udny Yule =

British statistician and geneticist

George Udny Yule
- Born: 18 February 1871; Morham, Scotland
- Died: 26 June 1951 (aged 80); Cambridge, England
- Education: University College London
- Known for: Yule distribution Yule's Y Yule's coefficient Yule–Simpson effect Yule–Walker equations Preferential attachment Simple birth process
- Awards: Guy Medal (Gold, 1911)
- Scientific career
- Fields: Statistics, Genetics
- Workplaces: University College London, University of Cambridge

George Udny Yule, CBE, FRS (18 February 1871 – 26 June 1951), usually known as Udny Yule, was a British statistician, particularly known for the Yule distribution and proposing the preferential attachment model for random graphs.

== Personal life ==
Yule was born at Beech Hill, a house in Morham near Haddington, Scotland and died in Cambridge, England. He came from a Scottish family composed of army officers, civil servants, scholars, and administrators. His father, Sir George Udny Yule (1813–1886) was a brother of the noted orientalist Sir Henry Yule (1820–1889). His great-uncle was the botanist John Yule.

In 1899, Yule married May Winifred Cummings. The marriage was annulled in 1912, producing no children.

== Education and teaching ==
Udny Yule was educated at Winchester College and at the age of 16 at University College London where he read engineering. After a year in Bonn doing research in experimental physics under Heinrich Rudolf Hertz, Yule returned to University College in 1893 to work as a demonstrator for Karl Pearson, one of his former teachers. Pearson was beginning to work in statistics and Yule followed him into this new field. Yule progressed to an assistant professorship but he left in 1899 to a better-paid position as secretary to an examination board, working under Philip Magnus at the City and Guilds Institute.

In 1902 Yule became Newmarch lecturer in statistics at University College, a position he held together with his post at the City and Guilds Institute. He continued to publish articles and also wrote an influential textbook, Introduction to the Theory of Statistics (1911), based on his lectures.

In 1912 Yule moved to Cambridge University to a newly created Lectureship in Statistics and he remained in Cambridge for the rest of his life. During the First World War Yule worked for the army and then for the Ministry of Food. A heart attack in 1931 left him semi-invalid and led to his early retirement. His flow of publications almost ceased, but in the 1940s he found new interests, one of which led to a book, The Statistical Study of Literary Vocabulary.

== Scholarship ==
Yule was a prolific writer, the highlight of his publications being perhaps the textbook Introduction to the Theory of Statistics, which went through fourteen editions and was published in several languages. He was active in the Royal Statistical Society, was awarded its Guy Medal in Gold in 1911, and served as its president in 1924–26.

Yule's first paper on statistics appeared in 1895: "On the Correlation of Total Pauperism with Proportion of Out-relief". Yule was interested in applying statistical techniques to social problems and he quickly became a member of the Royal Statistical Society. For many years the only members interested in mathematical statistics were Yule, Edgeworth and Bowley. In 1897–99 Yule wrote important papers on correlation and regression. After 1900 he worked on a parallel theory of association. His approach to association was quite different from Pearson's and relations between them deteriorated. Yule had broad interests and his collaborators included the agricultural meteorologist R. H. Hooker, the medical statistician Major Greenwood and the agricultural scientist Sir Frank Engledow. Yule's sympathy towards the newly rediscovered Mendelian theory of genetics led to several papers.

In the 1920s Yule wrote three influential papers on time series analysis, "On the time-correlation problem" (1921), a critique of the variate difference method, an investigation of a form of spurious correlation (1926) and "On a Method of Investigating Periodicities in Disturbed Series, with Special Reference to Wolfer's Sunspot Numbers" (1927), which used an autoregressive model to model the sunspot time series instead of the established periodogram method of Schuster.

== Yule distribution ==
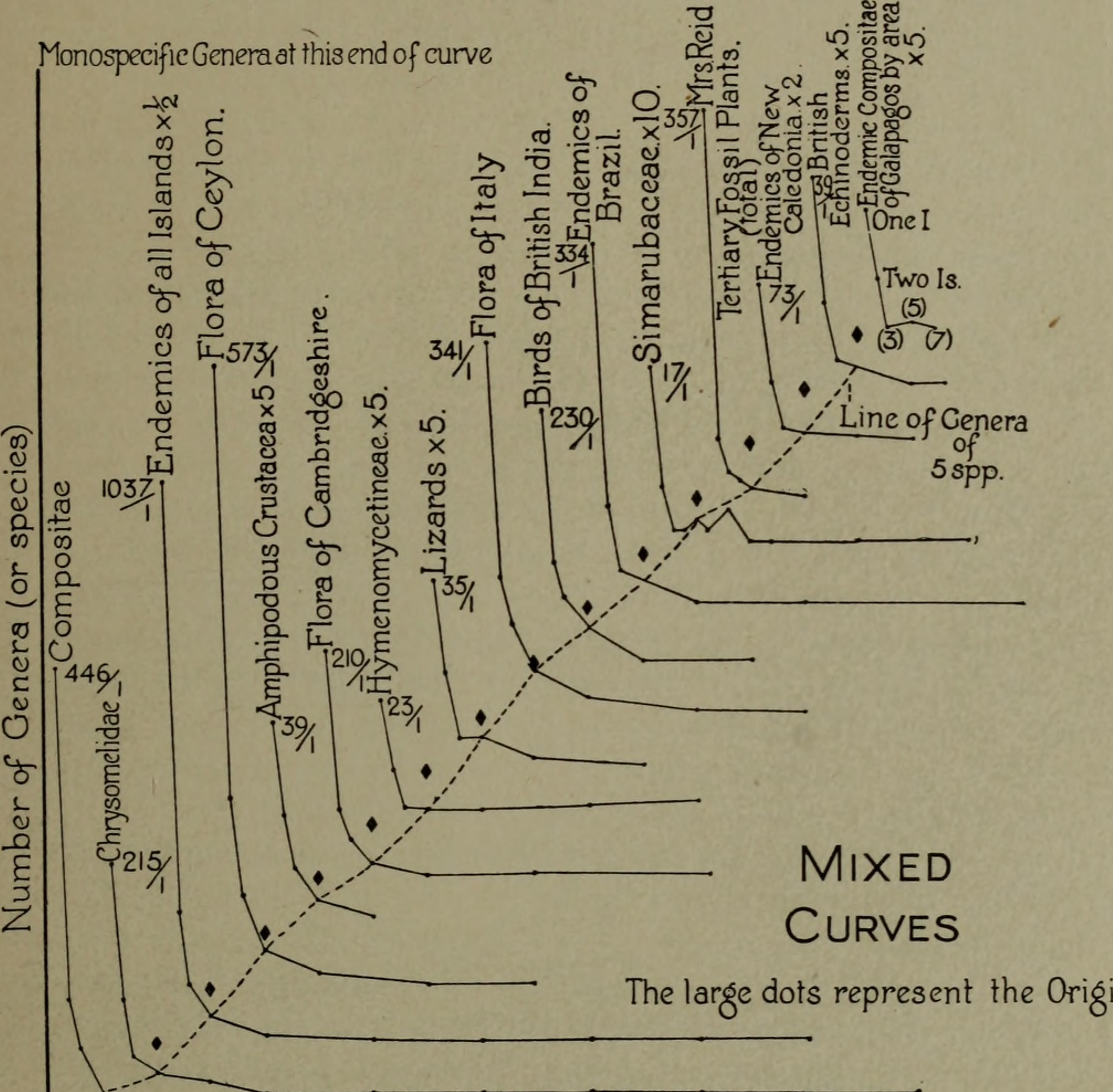
Figure from page 241 of Age and Area, by J. C. Willis. When plotted on a log-log plot, each of these curves become a straight line, indicating a power-law.

In 1922, J. C. Willis published Age and Area, based on botanical field work in Ceylon, where he studied the distributional patterns of the Ceylonese vascular plants in great detail. He compiled a table of the number of existent species in each genus of flowering plants and the same for the Rubiaceae, and for the Chrysomelid beetles.

Let $y(x)$ be the number of genera with $x$ existent species. When $y(x)$ is plotted on a log-log plot, each of these follows a straight line. This shows that $y(x) \propto x^a$ for some $a$. That is, the distribution has a power-law tail. The figures are found in Willis and Yule's Nature article, or Willis's monograph page 241 and 242.

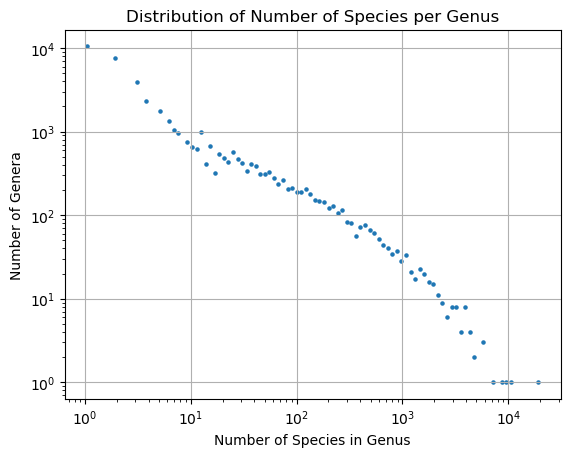
A modern reproduction of the Yule diagram, using all genera of plants in the World Flora Online Plant List.

In 1925 Yule published the paper "A Mathematical Theory of Evolution, based on the Conclusions of Dr. J. C. Willis, F.R.S.", where he proposed a stochastic process that reproduces the power-law tail. This was later called the Yule process but is now better known as preferential attachment. Herbert A. Simon dubbed the resulting distribution the Yule distribution in his honour.

== Assessment ==
Frank Yates culminated his 1952 obituary of Yule by saying:

“To summarize we may, I think, justly conclude that though Yule did not fully develop any completely new branches of statistical theory, he took the first steps in many directions which were later to prove fruitful lines for further progress… He can indeed rightly claim to be one of the pioneers of modern statistics”.

Yule made important contributions to the theory and practice of correlation, regression, and association, as well as to time series analysis. He pioneered the use of preferential attachment stochastic processes to explain the origin of power law distribution. The Yule distribution, a discrete power law, is named after him.

Although Yule taught at Cambridge for twenty years, he had little impact on the development of statistics there. M. S. Bartlett recalled him as a "mentor" but his famous association with Maurice Kendall, who revised the Introduction to the Theory of Statistics, only came about after Kendall had graduated.

== Selected works ==
- Yule, G. U. (1896). "On the Significance of Bravais' Formulae for Regression, &c., in the Case of Skew Correlation". Proceedings of the Royal Society of London. 60 (359–367): 477–489. Bibcode:1896RSPS...60..477U. doi:10.1098/rspl.1896.0075.
- Yule, G. U. (1900). "On the Association of Attributes in Statistics: With Illustrations from the Material of the Childhood Society, &c". Philosophical Transactions of the Royal Society A: Mathematical, Physical and Engineering Sciences. 194 (252–261): 257–319. Bibcode:1900RSPTA.194..257Y. doi:10.1098/rsta.1900.0019.
- Yule, G. U.; Pearson, K. (1901). "On the Theory of Consistence of Logical Class-Frequencies, and Its Geometrical Representation". Philosophical Transactions of the Royal Society A: Mathematical, Physical and Engineering Sciences. 197 (287–299): 91. Bibcode:1901RSPTA.197...91Y. doi:10.1098/rsta.1901.0015.
- Yule, G. U. (1902). "Mendel's Laws and their probable relations to inter-racial heredity". New Phytologist. 1 (10): 226–227. doi:10.1111/j.1469-8137.1902.tb07336.x.
- Yule, G. U. (1907). "On the Theory of Correlation for any Number of Variables, Treated by a New System of Notation". Proceedings of the Royal Society A: Mathematical, Physical and Engineering Sciences. 79 (529): 182–193. Bibcode:1907RSPSA..79..182Y. doi:10.1098/rspa.1907.0028. hdl:2027/coo.31924081088423.
- Yule, G. Udny (1911). An Introduction to the Theory of Statistics. London: Charles Griffin. Eighth Edition, 1927
- Yule, G. U. (1927). "On a Method of Investigating Periodicities in Disturbed Series, with Special Reference to Wolfer's Sunspot Numbers". Philosophical Transactions of the Royal Society A: Mathematical, Physical and Engineering Sciences. 226 (636–646): 267–298. Bibcode:1927RSPTA.226..267Y. doi:10.1098/rsta.1927.0007.
