= George Kingsley Zipf =

American linguist (1902–1950)

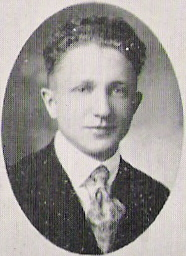
- 1917 photograph from the 1919 Annual of the Freeport High School, Freeport, Illinois
- Born: January 7, 1902; Freeport, Illinois
- Died: September 25, 1950 (aged 48); Newton, Massachusetts
- Education: Harvard College
- Known for: Zipf's law
- Spouse: Joyce Waters Brown Zipf
- Children: 4
- Scientific career
- Fields: Statistics, linguistics

George Kingsley Zipf (/ˈzɪf/ ZIF; January 7, 1902 – September 25, 1950) was an American linguist and philologist who studied statistical occurrences in different languages.

Zipf earned his bachelor's, master's, and doctoral degrees from Harvard University, and also studied at the University of Bonn and the University of Berlin.

He was chairman of the German department and university lecturer (meaning he could teach any subject he chose) at Harvard University. He worked with Chinese and demographics, and much of his effort can explain properties of the Internet, distribution of income within nations, and many other collections of data.

== Zipf's law ==
He is the eponym of Zipf's law, which states that while only a few words are used very often, many or most are used rarely,

$$P_n \sim 1/n^a$$

where P_{n} is the frequency of a word ranked n^{th} and the exponent a is almost 1. This means that the second item occurs approximately 1/2 as often as the first, and the third item 1/3 as often as the first, and so on. Zipf's discovery of this law in 1935 was one of the first academic studies of word frequency.

Although he originally intended it as a model for linguistics, Zipf later generalized his law to other disciplines. In particular, he observed that the rank vs. frequency distribution of individual incomes in a unified nation approximates this law, and in his 1941 book National Unity and Disunity, he theorized that breaks in this "normal curve of income distribution" portend social pressure for change or revolution.

== Mathematics ==
Zipf did not like mathematics. In his 1932 publication, the author speaks with disdain about mathematical involvement in linguistics, a.o. ibidem, p. 21:

... let me say here for the sake of any mathematician who may plan to formulate the ensuing data more exactly, the ability of the highly intense positive to become the highly intense negative, in my opinion, introduces the devil into the formula in the form of $\ \sqrt{ -i\; } ~.$

The only mathematical expression Zipf used looks like ab^{2} = constant, which he "borrowed" from Alfred J. Lotka's 1926 publication.

== See also ==
- Zipf–Mandelbrot law

== Bibliography ==
- Zipf, George Kingsley (1932): Selected Studies of the Principle of Relative Frequency in Language. Cambridge, Mass.
- (1935): The Psycho-Biology of Language. Cambridge, Mass.
- (1941): National unity and disunity
- (1946): The P1 P2/D Hypothesis: On the Intercity Movement of Persons. American Sociological Review, vol. 11, Dec, p. 677
- (1949): Human behavior and the principle of least effort
