= Karsa =

Karsa may refer to:

- Karsa (League of Legends player) (born 1997), Taiwanese professional eSports player
- Karsa, Kenya, a basalt geological formation, archaeological site, and watering hole on Lake Turkana
- Karsa River, in western Ethiopia
- Karsa, India, a village in Nilokheri tehsil, Karnal, Haryana
- Karsa Orlong, a character in the Malazan Book of the Fallen epic fantasy series by Steven Erikson
- Cash (currency) or karsa, an obsolete Indian currency
- Karsha pana, an Ancient Indian coin

== See also ==
- Kärsa (disambiguation)
- Kasu (disambiguation)
