= List of English words of Hindi or Urdu origin =

This is a list of English-language words of Hindi and Urdu origin, two distinguished registers of the Hindustani language (Hindi-Urdu). Many of the Hindi and Urdu equivalents have originated from Sanskrit; see List of English words of Sanskrit origin. Many loanwords are of Persian origin; see List of English words of Persian origin, with some of the latter being in turn of Arabic or Turkic origin. In some cases, words have entered the English language by multiple routes - occasionally ending up with different meanings, spellings, or pronunciations, just as with words with European etymologies. Many entered English during the British Raj in colonial India. These borrowings, dating back to the colonial period, are often labelled as "Anglo-Indian".

== A ==
Avatar
From Hindi, inherited from Sanskrit अवतार (avatāra), "to cross down", referring to the descent of a deity from heaven.

Aloo
from Hindi, Urdu, and Sanskrit ālū.

== B ==
Bandana
from bāndhnā (باندھنا/बांधना) to tie.
Bangle
from bāngṛī बांगड़ी, a type of bracelet.: Pashto: Bangři بنګړي
Blighty
"Britain" (as a term of endearment among British troops stationed in Colonial India): from Hindi-Urdu vilāyatī (विलायती, ولايتى) "foreign", ultimately from Arabo-Persian/Pashto ولايتي "provincial, regional".
Bungalow
from बंगला bangla and Urdu بنگلہ bangla, literally, "(house) in the Bengal style".

== C ==
Charpoy
from Hindi: चार/Urdu: چار, romanized: cār, lit. 'four' and पाई/پائی, pāʼī, 'legged, foot'.
Chaat
from Hindustani cāṭ.
Cheetah
from cītā, چیتا, चीता, meaning "variegated".
Chhatri
from Hindustani چھتری / छतरी (chatrī, “umbrella, canopy”).
Chit
from چٹھی चिट्ठी chitthi, a letter or note.
Chutney
from 'chaṭnī', چٹنی, चटनी, ultimately derived from the full-infinitive word 'chāṭnā', چاٹنا, चाटना, meaning 'to lick'.
Cot
from khāṭ, खाट, a bed.
Chowkat
from chokath, چوکھٹ / चौखट, a door frame.
Cummerbund
ultimately from Persian via Hindi-Urdu कमरबन्द/کمربند, kamarband, – from kamar 'waist, loins' and -bandi 'band'.
Cushy
from Hindi-Urdu ख़ुशी/خوشی, k͟hushī, 'pleasure', from Persian خوش ḵuš. Some sources prefer an origin from "cushion".

== D ==
Dacoit
from Daku, meaning a member of a class of criminals who engage in organised robbery and murder. Hence also dacoity (banditry)
Dekko
(UK slang for 'a look') from دیکھو देखो Dekho, the imperative 'look', (دیکھو देखो) meaning look at or study something.
Dinghy
from Dinghi, small boat, wherry-boat
Dungaree
Heavy denim fabric, also referring to trousers made thereof, from Hindi डूंगरी (ḍūṅgrī, “coarse calico”), first worn by labourers in the Dongri area of Mumbai (Bombay).

== G ==
Ganja
Hindi term for cannabis. Popularized by Jamaica after Indian indentured labourers introduced the plant to the island during the 19th century.
Garam masala
from Hindi गरम मसाला and Urdu گرم مصالحہ garam masālā, literally "hot ( = spicy) mixture", from Persian گرم garm 'warm, hot' and Arabic مصالح maṣāliḥ 'benefits, requirements, ingredients'.
Gavial
from Hindustani ghaṛiyāl,گھڑیال / घड़ियाल, ultimately derived from the Sanskrit word घण्टिक.
Guru
from Hindi guru "teacher, priest," from Sanskrit गुरु guru "one to be honored, teacher," literally "heavy, weighty."
Gymkhana
A term which originally referred to a place where sporting events take place and referred to any of various meets at which contests were held to test the skill of the competitors. In English-speaking countries, a gymkhana refers to a multi-game equestrian event performed to display the training and talents of horses and their rider [-khānā from Pers. khānāh خانه "house, dwelling"]

== J ==
Jaconet
modification of Sanskrit jagannaath, from Jagannath Puri, India, where such cloth was first made.
Jodhpurs
Full-length trousers, worn for horseback riding, that are close-fitting below the knee, flared and roomy at the thigh, and have reinforced patches on the inside of the leg. Named after Jodhpur, where similar garments are worn by Indian men as part of everyday dress.
Juggernaut
from Jagannath (Sanskrit: जगन्नाथ jagannātha, Odia: ଜଗନ୍ନାଥ jagannātha), a form of Vishnu particularly worshipped at the Jagannath Temple, Puri, Odisha where during Rath Yatra festival thousands of devotees pull three temple carts some 14m (45 feet) tall, weighing hundreds of tons through the streets. These carts seat three statues of the deities, meant to be two brothers and their sister for a 'stroll' outside after the ritual worship session. They are fed by thousands and thousands of worshipers with holy food, as if the icons were living. Early European visitors witnessed these festivals and returned with—possibly apocryphal—reports of religious fanatics committing suicide by throwing themselves under the wheels of the carts. So the word became a metaphor for something immense and unstoppable because of institutional or physical inertia; or impending catastrophe that is foreseeable yet virtually unavoidable because of such inertia.
Jungle
from the Sanskrit word जङ्गल jaṅgala, and later jangal in Hindi as जंगल and Urdu as جنگل. Jaṅgala means "uncultivated land" which refers to the wilderness or forest.

== K ==
Khaki
from ख़ाकी khākī "of dust colour, dusty, grey", cf. Hindi ख़ाकी - Urdu خاکی [ultimately from Persian].
Karma
from Sanskrit, the result of a person's actions as well as the actions themselves. It is a term about the cycle of cause and effect.
Kedgeree
from Hindi खिचड़ी, Kedgeree is thought to have originated with the Indian rice-and-bean or rice-and-lentil dish khichri, traced back to 1340 or earlier.

== L ==
Loot
from Loot لوٹ लूट, meaning 'steal'. Robbery

== M ==
Multan
from Multan, Pakistan: A kind of rug prevalent there.
Mogul
from Hindi and Urdu: An acknowledged leader in a field, from the Mughal rulers of India like Akbar the Great, and Shah Jahan, the builder of the Taj Mahal.
Maharaja
from Hindi and Sanskrit: A great king.
Mantra
from Hindi and Sanskrit: a word or phrase used in meditation.
Masala
from Urdu, to refer to flavoured spices of Indian origin.

== N ==
Nirvana
(in Jainism, Hinduism, Sikhism, and Buddhism) a transcendent state in which there is neither suffering, desire, nor sense of self, and the subject is released from the effects of karma and the cycle of death and rebirth. It represents the final goal of Jainism, Hinduism, Sikhism, and Buddhism.

== P ==
Pashmina
from Hindi पश्मीना, Urdu پشمينه, ultimately from Persian پشمينه.
Punch
from Hindi and Urdu panch پانچ, meaning "five". The drink was originally made with five ingredients: alcohol, sugar, lemon, water, and tea or spices. The original drink was named paantsch.
Pundit
from पण्डित Pandit, meaning a learned scholar or Priest.
Pukka
(UK slang: "genuine") from Pakkā पक्का, پکا, cooked, ripe, solid.
Purdah
from Hindi-Urdu पर्दा, پردہ Pardah (ultimately from Persian) meaning 'the pre-election period'.
Pyjamas
from Hindi and Urdu, پاجامہ / पाजामा (paijaamaa), meaning "leg garment", coined from Persian پاى "foot, leg" and جامه "garment" .

== R ==
Raita
from Hindi and Urdu रायता رائتہ rayta. yogurt based dish, some add sliced/chopped/diced, cucumbers, onions, tomatoes, pineapples, pomegranate or other salads to complement rice or roti meals.
Roti
from Hindi and Urdu रॊटी روٹی roti "bread"; akin to Prakrit रॊट्ट rotta "rice flour", Sanskrit रोटिका rotika "kind of bread".

== S ==
Sepoy
Sepoy is derived from the Persian word sepāhī (سپاہی) meaning "infantry soldier" and was designated as a rank in the Mughal Army. The title and rank were implemented by the East India Company and later the British Raj. The term continues to be used for noncommissioned ranks in the Indian, Pakistani and Nepalese militaries.

Shampoo
Derived from Hindustani chāmpo (चाँपो [tʃãːpoː]) (verb imperative, meaning "rub!"), dating to 1762.

== T ==
Teapoy
from charpoy चारपाई,چارپائی Teen payi (तीन पाय) in Hindi-Urdu, meaning "three legged" or "coffee table".
Thug
from Thagi ठग,ٹھگ Thag in Hindi-Urdu, meaning "thief or con man".
Tickety-boo
possibly from Hindi ठीक है, बाबू (ṭhīk hai, bābū), meaning "it's all right, sir".
Toddy (also Hot toddy)
from Tāṛī ताड़ी, juice of the palmyra palm.
Typhoon
from Urdu طوفان toofaan. A cyclonic storm.

== V ==
Veranda
from Hindustani baramdaa برآمدہ / बरामदा, but ultimately from Portuguese.

== Y ==
Yaar
A colloquial South Asian word, it has been defined as a noun to refer to a ‘familiar form of address: friend, mate’. It is originally a loanword from Persian یار (yār). The first known use of yaar in English was in 1963.

== Z ==
Zamindar

A landowner, especially one who leases his land to tenant farmers. Via Urdu from Persian zamīndār, from zamīn ‘land’ + -dār ‘holder’.

== See also ==
- Glossary of the British Raj
- Indian English
- Hobson-Jobson
- List of English words of Sanskrit origin
- Lists of English words of international origin
