= Katantra =

Treatise on Sanskrit grammar

The Katantra (Sanskrit: कातन्त्र; IAST: Kātantra) is a treatise on Sanskrit grammar (Vyakarana) attributed to Sharvavarman living at the time of the Satavahana dynasty.

It is a simplified and abridged version of Pāṇini's Aṣṭādhyāyī and divided into the chapters Sandhi, Nāmni Catuṣṭaya and Ākhyāta.

The terms Kālāpa, Kālāpaka and Kālāpa-vyākaraṇasūtra refer to either the Katantra or a different version of it.

Arthur Coke Burnell compared the arrangement of the Katantra to those of the Aindra school and the Tolkāppiyam.
