= Kakkakuyil =

2001 film by Priyadarshan

- DVD Cover
- Directed by: Priyadarshan
- Screenplay by: Priyadarshan
- Story by: Murali Nagavally
- Produced by: Lissy
- Starring: Mohanlal; Mukesh
- Cinematography: S. Kumar
- Edited by: N. Gopalakrishnan
- Music by: M G Sreekumar credited as Deepan Chatterjee
- Production company: Kalyani Film Society
- Distributed by: Swargachitra
- Release date: 14 April 2001
- Running time: 175 minutes
- Country: India
- Language: Malayalam

Kakkakuyil (transl. Asian koel) is a 2001 Indian Malayalam-language heist comedy film written and directed by Priyadarshan and produced by Lissy. It stars Mohanlal and Mukesh. The film features songs composed by M.G Sreekumar (credited as Deepan Chatterji) and background score by S. P. Venkatesh. Kakkakuyil was released on 14 April 2001. It was remade in Telugu as Tappu Chesi Pappu Koodu (2002) and in Tamil as London (2005). The plot of the movie is based on the 1988 English movie A Fish Called Wanda with the added subplot of the two lead actors seeking shelter in the house of an old blind couple while pretending to be a single person having been borrowed from the Marathi play Ghar Ghar.

== Plot ==
An unemployed man named Sivaraman comes to Mumbai to find a job. Unfortunately, he loses all his certificates and money, but happens to find Govindan Kutty, an old buddy from his native place in Kerala, who is also jobless and wandering in Mumbai. They try to get a visa from a travel agency, but find no way to gather the large sums demanded for a visa. Govindan Kutty persuades Sivaraman to participate in a bank robbery planned by Thomas Mathews and his gang, including his stammering brother Tyootty and lover Elina.

They join the gang, but the plan puts them in more trouble as the robbery ends in vain when they hit Pothuval. Elina secretly informs the police about the robbery and also that the entire plan was carried out by Thomas, so that she could steal the entire share of the money for herself. However, before getting arrested, Thomas hides the money, and the place is kept secret except to his lawyer Nambeeshan. Elina pretends to be in love with Nambeeshan to find the place where the money is hidden.

Meanwhile, to find a safe cover, Sivaraman and Govindan Kutty plan to impersonate Kunjunni, the grandson of a rich but blind elderly couple, Thampuran and Sethu. They haven't seen their grandchild since his childhood as he currently resides in the United States, and the couple have an estranged relation with their relatives who do not live with them. Sivaraman and Govindan Kutty end up disguising with the body of Govindan Kutty and the voice of Sivaraman to make up for Kunjunni in front of the blind couple.

Pothuval, who knows Govindan Kutty before and who served as a former servant and house-caretaker to the blind couple, makes several attempts to make Thampuran learn the truth, but all of them fail knowingly or unknowingly, much to the luck of Sivaraman and Govindan Kutty. While successfully carrying on, they are interrupted by Radhika Menon, who disguises herself as the lover of Kunjunni. She calls on all the estranged relatives of the couple by mocking them. The relatives arrive in the absence of Sivaraman. Finding no way-out, Govindan Kutty pretends to have fainted unconscious and is hospitalised. Sivaraman comes to his rescue and says that he is Dr. Gopalakrishnan, a friend of Kunjunni from the United States. Sivaraman and Govindan Kutty get angry at Radhika and they insult her in a comical argument.

After many successful and comical escapades during their drama, Govindan Kutty tries to steal the Lord Krishna statue so that he can fetch a huge amount of money by selling it, for which he places a teapoy in the staircase to injure the blind elderly lady which keeps all others out of the house for sometime. Sivaraman engages in a fight with Govindan Kutty when he tries to leave with the statue he had stolen. Thampuran accuses his relatives for the accident and asks all his relatives to leave immediately after learning that they were greedy for his wealth. While Thampuran was reprimanding the relatives, Sivaraman and Govindan Kutty learn that the elderly couple had become blind in a car accident decades ago, in which their son and daughter-in-law (Kunjunni's parents) had died. Sivaraman and Govindan Kutty become desperate as the date for the visa payment nears. Radhika gives them the money for the visa and asks them to leave the house. Sivaraman and Govindan Kutty accept the money and leave the house.

Upon leaving, they discover that the visa agency was a fake. Having lost all their resources, Govindan Kutty plans to start a new business with the money they have. Feeling remorseful for cheating off Thampuran and Sethu, Sivaraman disagrees to take the money, which drove an angry Govindan Kutty to leave him while taking the money. Meanwhile, a sorrowful Pothuval and Radkiha informed Thampuran that the actual Kunjunni tragically died in a construction-site accident in America. Radhika also revealed to Thampuran that she is Kunjunni's actual lover Revathy, and that she came to initially inform the truth, but joined in with Sivaraman and Govindan Kutty after seeing that their drama has kept Thampuran and Sethu happy and cheerful. Upon hearing the truth, Sivaraman returns to confesses all his actions to Thampuran, who asks him to continue the drama in front of Sethu, as Thampuran fears that she will die in shock if she learns the tragic truth. Sethu comes and calls Kunjunni, but she gets no replies, though she finally meets up with Govindan Kutty, who has returned in remorse. Thampuran then forgives both Sivaraman and Govindan Kutty by hugging them. And, while going back, Radhika promises Thampuran that she will return again. Thampuran, Sivaraman, and Govindan Kutty have a funny moment together.

In the closing scene it is shown that Thomas and Tyootty have started a new humbug. Nambeeshan has gone back to his native place and has started farming and his ex-wife marries a younger man. Pothuval starts an anti-alcohol society, and the future plans of Elina remain unknown.

== Cast ==
- Mohanlal as Sivaraman / Kunjunni's sound (Fake)
- Mukesh as Govindan Kutty / Kunjunni's body (Fake)
- Nedumudi Venu as 'Thampuran', Kunjunni's blind grandfather
- Innocent as Pothuval
- Jagathy Sreekumar as Advocate Nambeeshan
- Cochin Haneefa as Thomas Mathews
- Jagadish as Tyootty Mathews
- Kaviyoor Ponnamma as Sethulakshmi Bai 'Thampuratti', Kunjunni's blind grandmother
- Arzoo Govitrikar as Radhika Menon / Revathy, Kunjunni's lover
- Sucheta Khanna as Elina
- Sukumari as Savitri, Nambeeshan's wife
- Shalu Menon as Shalini, Devooty's daughter
- Augustine as Rama Varma, Kunjunni's uncle
- Poornima Anand as Thampuran's and Thampuratti's daughter
- Suchitra Murali as Madhavan's daughter
- Manka Mahesh as Devooty, Thampuran's and Thampuratti's daughter
- T. P. Madhavan as D.Y.S.P Madhava Varma, Thampuran's younger brother
- James Stalin as Ramettan, Devooty's husband
- Ajayan Adoor as Doctor Rajan
- Ambalapuzha Raju (Sarathchandra Babu) as Shop Owner
- Vallathol Unnikrishnan as Thampuran's son-in-law
- Yamuna Rani as Sivaraman's mother
- Shanoor Sana as Sivaraman's sister
- Suniel Shetty as Kunjunni, cameo in the song "Aararum Kandillenno"
- Shweta Menon as Dancer in the song Alare Govinda
- Ramya Krishnan as Dancer in the song Megharagam Nerukil

== Production ==
Jyothika was selected as lead actress but was later replaced due to further commitments.

== Soundtrack ==
Kakkakuyil

Soundtrack album by Deepan Chatterjee
- Released: 1 January 2001
- Genre: Popular music
- Length: 39.31
- Label: East Coast Audio Entertainments
- Producer: Lissy

The hit songs in the film were composed by M G Sreekumar (credited in the movie as Deepan Chatterjee) with lyrics by Gireesh Puthenchery. S. P. Venkatesh composed the background music. The soundtrack album was released on 1 January 2001 by East Coast Audio Entertainments.

Kakkakuyil (Original Motion Picture Soundtrack)
No.	Title	Singer(s)	Length
1.	"Aararum Kandillenno"	M. G. Sreekumar, Sujatha Mohan	4:12
2.	"Padam Vanamali"	M. G. Sreekumar, K. S. Chithra, Kalyani Menon	5:21
3.	"Ponnumani Kannanunni" (Female Vocals)	Sujatha Mohan	5:57
4.	"Megharagam Nerukil" (Male Vocals)	M. G. Sreekumar	4:41
5.	"Unnikanna Vayo"	Kalyani Menon	0:43
6.	"Kakkakuyile Karuke Kuruke"	M. G. Sreekumar	4:33
7.	"Megharagam Nerukil" (Female Vocals)	K. S. Chithra	4:41
8.	"Ponnumani Kannanunni" (Male Vocals)	M. G. Sreekumar	5:56
9.	"Alare Govinda"	M. G. Sreekumar, Nikhil Menon, Sangeetha Sajith	5:25
