= Blighty =

British slang term for Britain or England

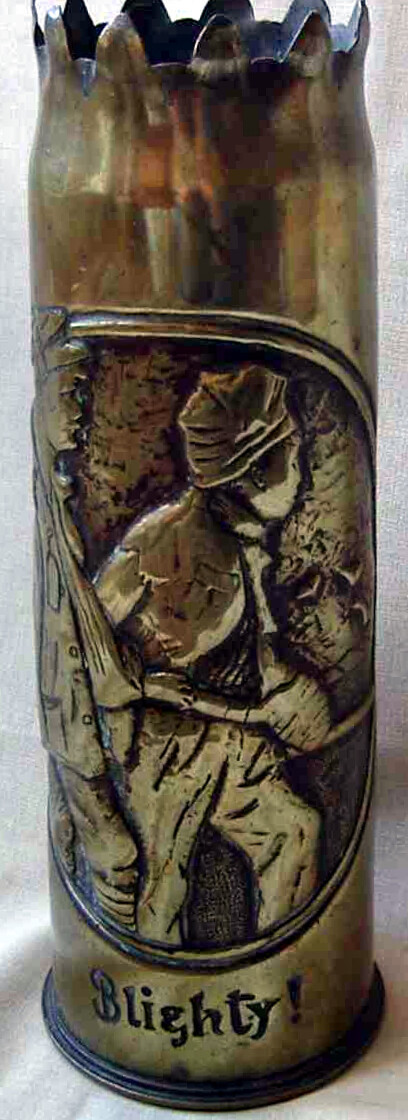
A World War I example of trench art: a shell case engraved with a picture of two wounded Tommies nearing the White Cliffs of Dover with the inscription "Blighty!"

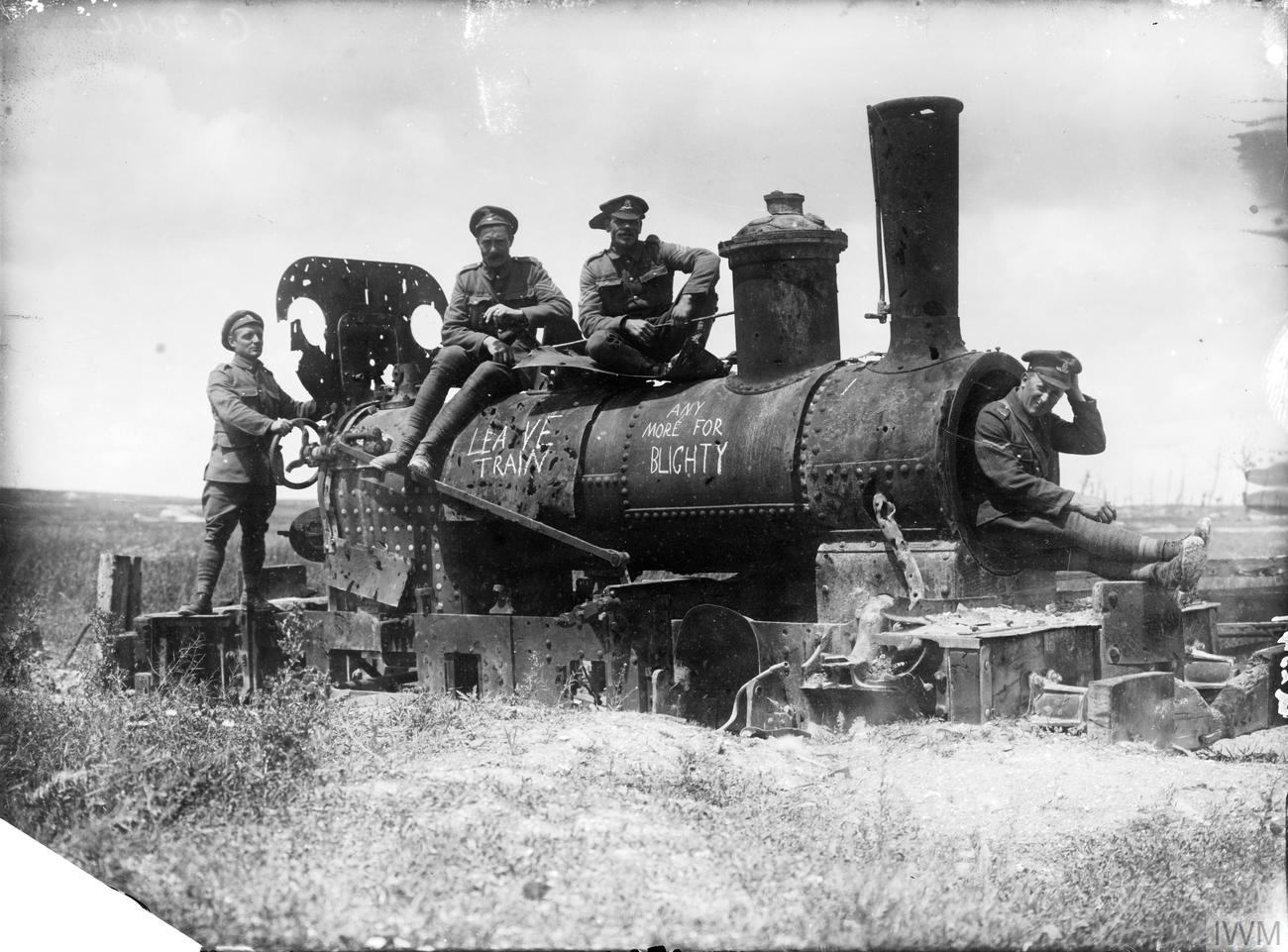
British troops posing with the wreckage of a German light railway engine, with the humorous scribbling on the engine "Leave train any more for blighty" (22 June 1917)

"Blighty" is a British English slang term for Great Britain, or often specifically England. Though it was used throughout the 1800s in the Indian subcontinent to mean an English or British visitor, it was first used during the Boer War in the specific meaning of homeland for the English or the British. From World War I and afterward, that use of the term became widespread.

== Etymology ==
The word derives from the Persian-derived Bengali word bilētī (or even from regional Hindustani language (i.e., Eastern Hindi) with the use of b replacing v/w), meaning 'foreign', which more specifically came to mean 'European', and 'British'/'English' during the time of the British Raj. The Bengali word bilētī is itself a loan of Indian Persian wilāyatī (ولایاتی), from wilāyat (ولایت) usually to mean 'Iran' and later 'the West', 'Europe' or 'Britain'/'England', ultimately from Arabic wilāyah (ولاية) meaning 'state, province'.

The term subsequently gained an ironic connotation in its closeness to the English word blight, which means "epidemic."

== Context ==
Blighty is commonly used as a term of endearment by the expatriate British community or those on holiday to refer to home. In Hobson-Jobson, an 1886 historical dictionary of Anglo-Indian words, Henry Yule and Arthur Coke Burnell explained that the word came to be used in British India for several things the British had brought into the country, such as the tomato and soda water.

During the First World War, "Dear Old Blighty" was a common sentimental reference, suggesting a longing for home by soldiers in the trenches. The term was particularly used by World War I poets such as Wilfred Owen and Siegfried Sassoon. During that war, a "Blighty wound" – a wound serious enough to require recuperation away from the trenches but not serious enough to kill or maim the victim – was hoped for by many, and sometimes self-inflicted.

== Usage ==
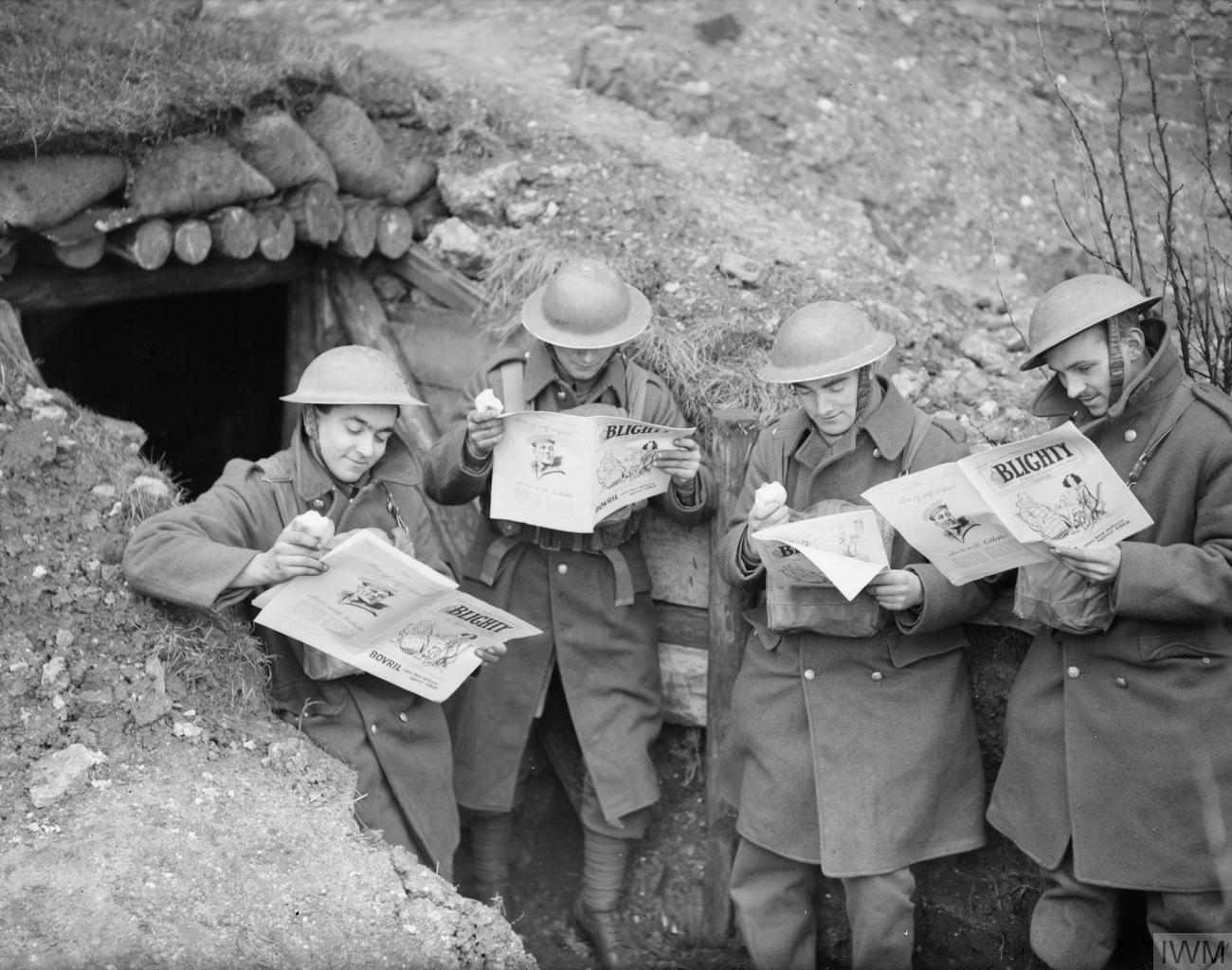
British soldiers reading copies of Blighty magazine outside their dugout in France, December 1939.

An early example of the usage of a derivative of the Arabic wilāyah being used to refer to Britain is after diplomat I'tisam-ud-Din returned from Britain back to the Mughal Empire. The locals nicknamed him Bilayet Munshi due to him being the first South Asian (c. 1765) to travel to what was known as the Bilayet.

Blighty, a humorous weekly magazine, was issued free to British troops during the First World War. It contained short stories, poems, cartoons, paintings, and drawings, with contributions from men on active service. It was distributed by the War Office, the Admiralty and the Red Cross, and subsidised through donations and sales to the general public. The magazine was revived in 1939 and continued until 1958.

In his First World War autobiography Good-Bye to All That (1929), the writer Robert Graves attributes the term Blitey to the Hindustani word for "home." He writes: "The men are pessimistic but cheerful. They all talk about getting a 'cushy' one to send them back to 'Blitey'."

The music hall artiste Vesta Tilley had a hit in 1916 with the song "I'm Glad I've Got a Bit of a Blighty One" (1916), in which she played a soldier delighted to have been wounded and in hospital. "When I think about my dugout," she sang, "where I dare not stick my mug out. ... I'm glad I've got a bit of a blighty one". Another music hall hit was "Take Me Back to Dear Old Blighty" (1917). The song is sung by Cicely Courtneidge in the 1962 film The L-Shaped Room. The term was also referenced in the song "All American Alien Boy" by Ian Hunter ("I'm just a whitey from Blighty"), from the 1976 album of the same name. Folksinger Ian Robb's album Rose and Crown features a topical parody of the traditional song "Maggie May", about the Falklands War. The song contains the lines: "When I get back to Blighty, I'll give thanks to The Almighty / Whether Maggie's little war is lost or won".

"Little Blighty on the Down" was a satirical radio comedy series broadcast on BBC Radio 4 between 1988 and 1992. It was a parody of contemporary life in Britain (specifically during the premiership of Margaret Thatcher), as reflected in the fictional small village of "Little Blighty".

UKTV operated a digital television channel called Blighty that opened in February 2009 and closed on 5 July 2013. The subscription channel, which concentrated on British-made programming, was replaced by a Freeview channel called Drama.
