= Aintiram =

Aintiram may refer to:

- The Aindra school of grammar
- A text on Vastu attributed to Mamuni Mayan written in old Tamil.
