= Kärsa =

Kärsa may refer to:

- Kärsa, Lääne-Viru County, village in Väike-Maarja Parish, Lääne-Viru County, Estonia
- Kärsa, Põlva County, village in Põlva Parish, Põlva County, Estonia

== See also ==
- Karsa (disambiguation)
