= Nigel Hankin =

Anglo-Indian soldier (1920–2007)

Nigel Bathurst Hankin
- Born: 14 March 1920; Bexhill, Sussex - United Kingdom
- Died: 30 November 2007 (aged 87); Delhi, India
- Occupations: Author of Hanklyn-Janklin, Soldier during British Raj, one of many Delhi, India British High Commission Hangers on.

Nigel Bathurst Hankin (1920–2007) was brought up by his grandmother in Bexhill, Sussex. He was sent to Burma during late World War II but the war ended around the time he reached Bombay, India (now Mumbai, India). He liked the bustle of the Indian Subcontinent (Delhi, India in particular) and lived there for the rest of his life.

One of his early formative experiences was watching the crowds at the funeral for Mohandas Karamchand Gandhi while he still wore the uniform of the newly defunct British Raj just after the formal Partition of India. His subsequent activities in India included running a mobile cinema. Later he worked for the British High Commission and during his tenure there he helped newcomers to India interpret the local mores and lingo. In 1992 he wrote a dictionary of Indian English, Hanklyn-Janklin, as a take off of the Hobson-Jobson Anglo-Indian dictionary from a century before.

Hankin never married, had no children and kept English traits such as eating an "English Breakfast" that included cornflakes. He gave tours of Delhi, including hidden bazaars and Coronation Park. He died aged 87.
