= Little Blighty on the Down =

UK radio program

- Genre: Comedy drama
- Running time: 30 minutes
- Country of origin: United Kingdom
- Language: English
- Home station: BBC Radio 4
- Starring: Jo Kendall; John Baddeley; Jonathan Kydd
- Written by: John O'Farrell; Mark Burton; Mike Coleman
- Produced by: David Tyler - S1; Lissa Evans - S2-5
- Original release: 2 September 1988 – 31 December 1992
- No. of series: 5
- No. of episodes: 28 (including 3 Christmas editions)
- Audio format: Stereophonic sound

Little Blighty on the Down is a satirical radio comedy series broadcast on BBC Radio 4 between 1988 and 1992, billed as "A satirical soap opera telling the everyday story of a country folk." It was a parody of contemporary life in Britain as seen in the small village of Little Blighty on the Down. Blighty is an old affectionate nickname for Britain; a down is a chalk hill, such as in England's South Downs. The village's name is thus suggestive of a Britain which is "little" rather than "great" in terms of importance or governance, and which shouldn't be described as being "on the up".

== Content ==
Comedian Jo Kendall stars as Mrs Hilda Roberts, domineering leader of the Parish Council, who engages in rather one-sided battles with her tongue-tied rival, Working men's club president Mr Blandish. Mrs Roberts is a clear parody of then-Prime Minister Margaret Thatcher, in her name (Thatcher's maiden name was Roberts and middle name was Hilda), in her political style, and in Kendall's performance (an exaggerated version of Thatcher's manner of speaking).

Each of the weekly half-hour episodes lampoons a particular political theme, e.g. party politics, the environment, health care, privatisations, the Cold War, the European Union, the criminal justice system, glasnost and perestroika, South Africa under apartheid. Current events would be used for some plot elements, e.g. the release of Nelson Mandela, the election of Solidarity in Poland, or the England football team versus West Germany.

Roberts's ruling party on the council are the Rotarians, in other words they are from the powerful and privileged sections of society but see themselves as being benevolent politicians, and are a satire on the Conservative Party. The series regularly lampooned Thatcher's perceived domineering attitude towards her Cabinet, through Mrs Roberts's heavy-handed management of her fellow councillors, accompanied by withering one-liners at their expense (delivered in Jo Kendall's foghorn-like vocal imitation of "Mrs T").

Their main opponents, at the Working Men's Club (a microcosm of the British Labour Party) are working-class folk whose ambitions to take power from the Rotarians are constantly frustrated by their own indecisiveness and internal fighting. Labour mud-slinging and party figures such as Tony Benn and Neil Kinnock are sent up.

The wider world and the UK's relations with it made appearances in the shape of Little Blighty's neighbours. To the west across a river lies the business-dominated city of Nukem, and to the east the city of Megaton, run by a dictatorial bureaucracy.

Nearer to Blighty is the richer, bratwurst-eating, BMW-driving town of Greater Krauton, hopefully soon to be united with their Megaton-like neighbours the Lesser Krauts. The Rotarians note Greater Krauton has virtues that they desire, like efficient transport, nice hospitals, and . . . more money!

The resource-laden, out-of-town supermarket Oppresto's (its name a parody of actual contemporary supermarket chain Presto), with its slavedriving managers like Mr F.W., downtrodden workforce, and rebellious trade union shop steward Mr Freeman, presents a moral dilemma for the Blightish. Is it morally right to benefit by trading with such an exploitative operation?

At home the Blighty Bugle with its fearless reporter and nervous editor, and the local aristocratic Lady, with her mansion and relatives, would stand in for the real-world Press and British royal family.

== Theme tune ==
The theme tune, played at the beginning and end of all episodes, is an instrumental version of the Second World War patriotic song, "There'll Always Be an England".

== Episode list ==
Series	Episode	Title	First broadcast	Additional episode information (from programmes)
1	1		2 September 1988	Mrs Hilda Roberts has been the domineering leader of the Little Blighty Parish Council for nine years. The Cock and Bull pub is the centre of village life. Mr Brownnose organises the Community Re-employment Action Plan (CRAP). The otters are dying in the polluted River Blight. Cast: John Bluthal, Andrew Sachs, Jo Kendall, Nick Hancock, Bernadine Corrigan, Daniel Strauss
1	2		9 September 1988	Mr Blandish heads the Workingmens' Club as an alternative to the Rotarians. Sparks takes over all the jobs in the village, but his livelihood is then threatened by the CRAP. Cast: John Bluthal, Andrew Sachs, Jo Kendall, Nick Hancock, Bernadine Corrigan, Daniel Strauss
1	3		16 September 1988	Little Blighty's policing comes under scrutiny, especially its violent and gun crime. As the regional Sports Day at Market Crassley looms, friendly rivalry becomes sinister espionage. And there's a new doctor at the surgery. Cast: John Bluthal, Jo Kendall, John Baddeley, Nick Hancock, Bernadine Corrigan, Daniel Strauss
2	1		21 July 1989	To counter the unpopularity of her village toll tax, Mrs Roberts wants to sell off more Council property, including the local rail assets, where she and the transport officer, Mr Prang, are foiled by an obstinate worker. Cast: Jo Kendall, Michael Troughton, John Baddeley, Bernadine Corrigan, Daniel Strauss, Jonathan Kydd
2	2		28 July 1989	Mrs Roberts wants a major change to the Rotarians to improve their unpopularity: the councillors thinks she's resigning, but she's sacking them. Is there anything in Little Blighty that she won't put out to private tender? The parish council are worried. Cast: Jo Kendall, Michael Troughton, John Baddeley, Bernadine Corrigan, Daniel Strauss, Jonathan Kydd
2	3		4 August 1989	The Oppresto supermarket deals with a boycott by stealing the cricket team mid-match. John Barnum is appointed the tourism officer. The wine club faces shrinking membership. Cast: Jo Kendall, Michael Troughton, John Baddeley, Jon Glover, Bernadine Corrigan, Daniel Strauss
2	4		11 August 1989	The silly season finds the Blighty Bugle short of stories, so their cub reporter investigates pollution in the river and the overloaded doctor's surgery, but Mrs Roberts uses her soft power to get the editor to spike the stories in case they reflect badly on the Rotarians. Cast: Jo Kendall, Michael Troughton, John Baddeley, Bernadine Corrigan, Daniel Strauss, Jonathan Kydd
2	5		18 August 1989	Mrs Roberts finds it hard to break off from running the village to go on holiday. The village's corrupt police officer PC Mason is uncovered by ... himself. Nature warden Mr Nice finds that the principle of the 'polluter pays' is popular with the electorate, but not with Mrs Roberts when she returns. Cast: Jo Kendall, Michael Troughton, John Baddeley, Bernadine Corrigan, Daniel Strauss, Brian Bove
2	Special	The Blighty Chronicles	29 December 1989	Mrs Roberts oversees the annual Blighty pageant, this year on its rich history, featuring contributions from Mr Stubbs on the Bronze Age, Mr Brownnose on the Normans, Dr Figures on the Black Death, and the Workingmen's Club on Robin Hood. However, Mrs Roberts's finale leads to disaster. Cast: Jo Kendall, Michael Troughton, John Baddeley, Bernadine Corrigan, Daniel Strauss, Jonathan Kydd
3	1		6 July 1990	Mrs Roberts wonders how to become more popular. Dr Figures revamps the health centre. Mr Freeman is released from captivity at Oppresto's and tours the area. The Little Blighty Subbuteo football team loses, causing a riot. Cast: Jo Kendall, Michael Troughton, John Baddeley, Bernadine Corrigan, Daniel Strauss, Jasper Jacob
3	2		13 July 1990	The editor of the Blighty Bugle gets a call from Deep Throat, an informant at the Parish council. Interviews are held for the new vicar. Megaton council is having financial difficulties. Arthur Pitts, the local coal merchant, is under suspicion about money from them he can't account for. Cast: Jo Kendall, Michael Troughton, John Baddeley, Bernadine Corrigan, Daniel Strauss, Jasper Jacob
3	3		20 July 1990	Prompted by the merger of neighbouring villages Greater Krauton and Lesser Krauton, council member Mr Stubbs makes a series of offensive remarks. Mrs Roberts refuses to sack her old friend until he becomes too popular. Cast: Jo Kendall, Michael Troughton, John Baddeley, Bernadine Corrigan, Daniel Strauss, Jonathan Kydd
3	4		27 July 1990	The council is broke, so Mr John Barnum, the treasurer, is instructed to raffle off the unsellable electrical substation. Mrs Roberts decides to massively increase Lady Spenny's payments from the council. The new vicar takes up his post. Cast: Jo Kendall, Michael Troughton, John Baddeley, Bernadine Corrigan, Jonathan Kydd, Daniel Strauss
3	5		3 August 1990	Mrs Roberts experiences the poor state of local trains first hand when she travels to Nukem to sell off the village to raise money. She sends Mr McGoohey to present the prizes at St Hilda's school, Mr Barnum to the market to placate the stallholders incensed by the raise in rates, and Sir Dudley to investigate the local corn circles. Cast: Jo Kendall, Michael Troughton, John Baddeley, Bernadine Corrigan, Daniel Strauss, Jonathan Kydd
4	1		5 July 1991	Mr Barnum persuades Mrs Roberts to vacate the Council Office after he takes over as leader of the Rotarians. There is a proliferation of Working Men's Clubs. Mr Blandish goes canvassing in the Messyside ward. Mr Barnum devises the Villagers' Charter. Cast: John Baddeley, Bernadine Corrigan, Jo Kendall, Jonathan Kydd, Daniel Strauss, Michael Troughton
4	2		12 July 1991	The Treasurer has put all the Council's money in a shady local bank. The council has to cut the annual donation to the plethora of local scout groups, which is widely unpopular. Cast: John Baddeley, Bernadine Corrigan, Jo Kendall, Jonathan Kydd, Daniel Strauss, Michael Troughton
4	3		19 July 1991	Mr & Mrs Barnum host a formal visit from Megaton council, with which Little Blighty has a special relationship, and uses it as an opportunity to launch his 126-point plan. Mrs Roberts hangs around on the fringes, and gives her memoirs to the Blighty Bugle. The Workingmen's Club re-introduces the ducking stool. Cast: John Baddeley, Bernadine Corrigan, Jo Kendall, Jonathan Kydd, Daniel Strauss, Michael Troughton
4	4		26 July 1991	Mr Barnum gets into a fight with Mr Blandish over being called a liar. He then stages a grand announcement of his Villagers' Charter, including making a radio advert that is shockingly honest. Cast: John Baddeley, Bernadine Corrigan, Jo Kendall, Jonathan Kydd, Daniel Strauss, Michael Troughton
4	5		2 August 1991	Viscount Tarquin Spenny and his wife Jane have marital difficulties. Mr Hedges from Nukem visits Mr Blotchley in Megaton to negotiate a treaty. After a long internal struggle, Mr Barnum outs himself as grey at the local music festival. Cast: John Baddeley, Bernadine Corrigan, Jo Kendall, Jonathan Kydd, Daniel Strauss, Michael Troughton
4	Special	It's A Wonderful Blight	26 December 1991	Mr Barnham's guardian angel shows the parish council leader what life in Little Blighty would be like if he had never been born.
5	1		10 July 1992	The parish council try to rent out their new office development, Turkey Wharf. But the news that it is unsuccessful comes too late, as the council have spent the profits twice over, on a public health campaign and on subsidising dentistry. Meanwhile, Mrs Roberts makes a rap record. Cast: Jo Kendall, John Baddeley, Bernadine Corrigan, Daniel Strauss, Jonathan Kydd, Alistair McGowan
5	2		17 July 1992	Mr Blandish is replaced at the Workingmen's Club by Fred Bloggs, and the leader of Nukem's council is being re-elected, but with more razzamatazz. The council's finances are tight, so the staff get a minimal pay rise, but the councillors' expenses continue to be overly generous. Cast: Jo Kendall, John Baddeley, Michael Troughton, Bernadine Corrigan, Daniel Strauss, Jonathan Kydd
5	3		24 July 1992	Councillor David Merrick's affair with a singer/actress is uncovered by the Blighty Bugle, whose editor Les Avanotherone is short on material. WPC Token finds that being a woman holds back her career in the police. Cast: Jo Kendall, John Baddeley, Michael Troughton, Bernadine Corrigan, Daniel Strauss, Jonathan Kydd
5	4		31 July 1992	Mr Ebenezer Birch is appointed head of the school, and introduces a two-stream education system. Hippy travellers start their annual occupation of farmer Giles's farm fields. Nukem take virtually all the medals at the Drug-U-Like district sports day. Cast: Jo Kendall, John Baddeley, Michael Troughton, Bernadine Corrigan, Daniel Strauss, Jonathan Kydd
5	5		7 August 1992	The Spennys have a cash flow problem and call in a debt, with cascading effects through the village, its bank and its property market. Meanwhile, the council has sold off all its assets, bar the prison. Cast: Jo Kendall, John Baddeley, Michael Troughton, Bernadine Corrigan, Daniel Strauss, Simon Godley
5	Special	Dead of Blight	31 December 1992	Lord and Lady Spenney invite the local dignitaries to dinner, where the guests recount tales of horror.
