= Leave (military) =

Extended period of leave from military service or imprisonment to return home

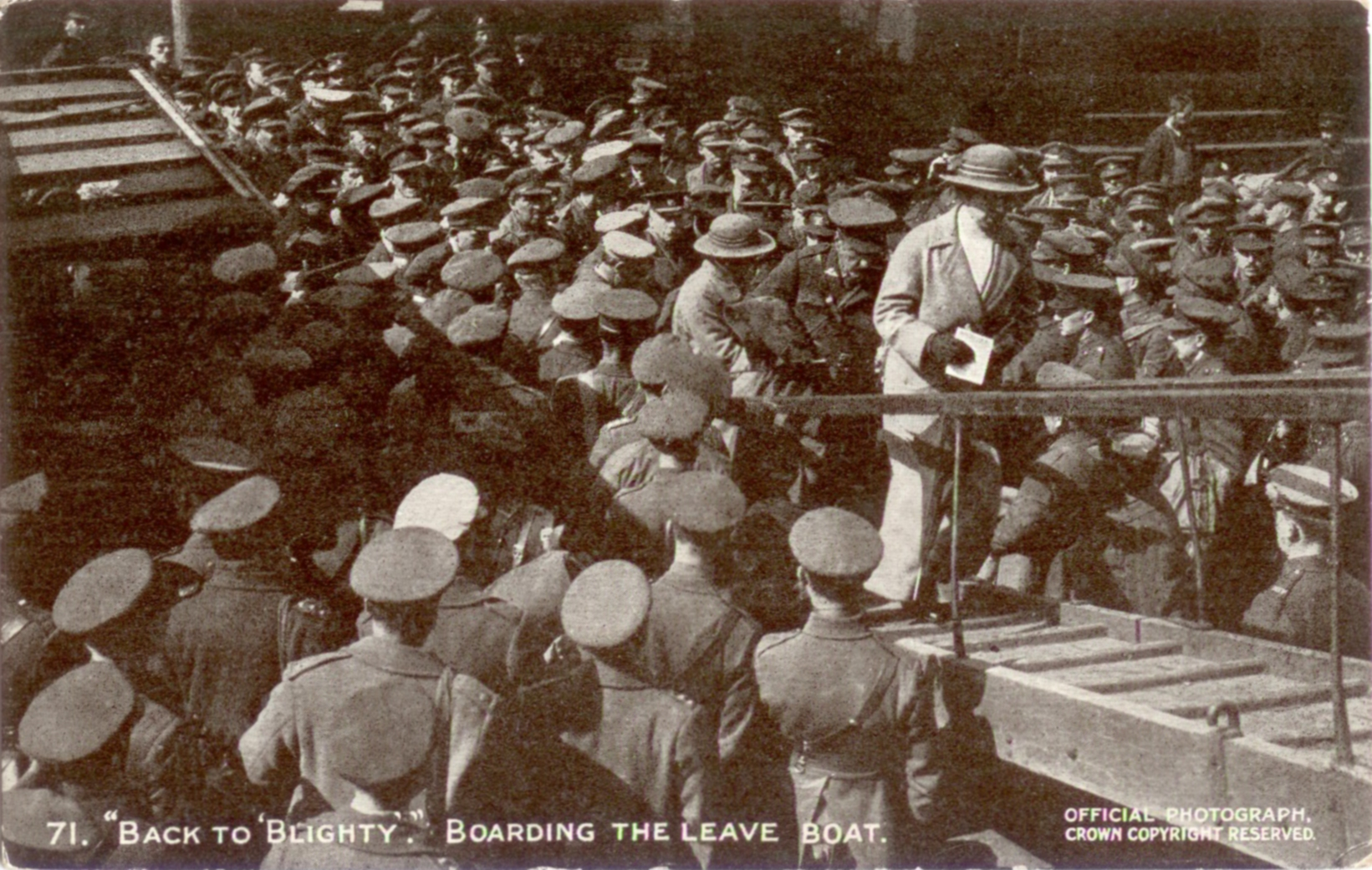
Soldiers boarding a leave boat during World War I

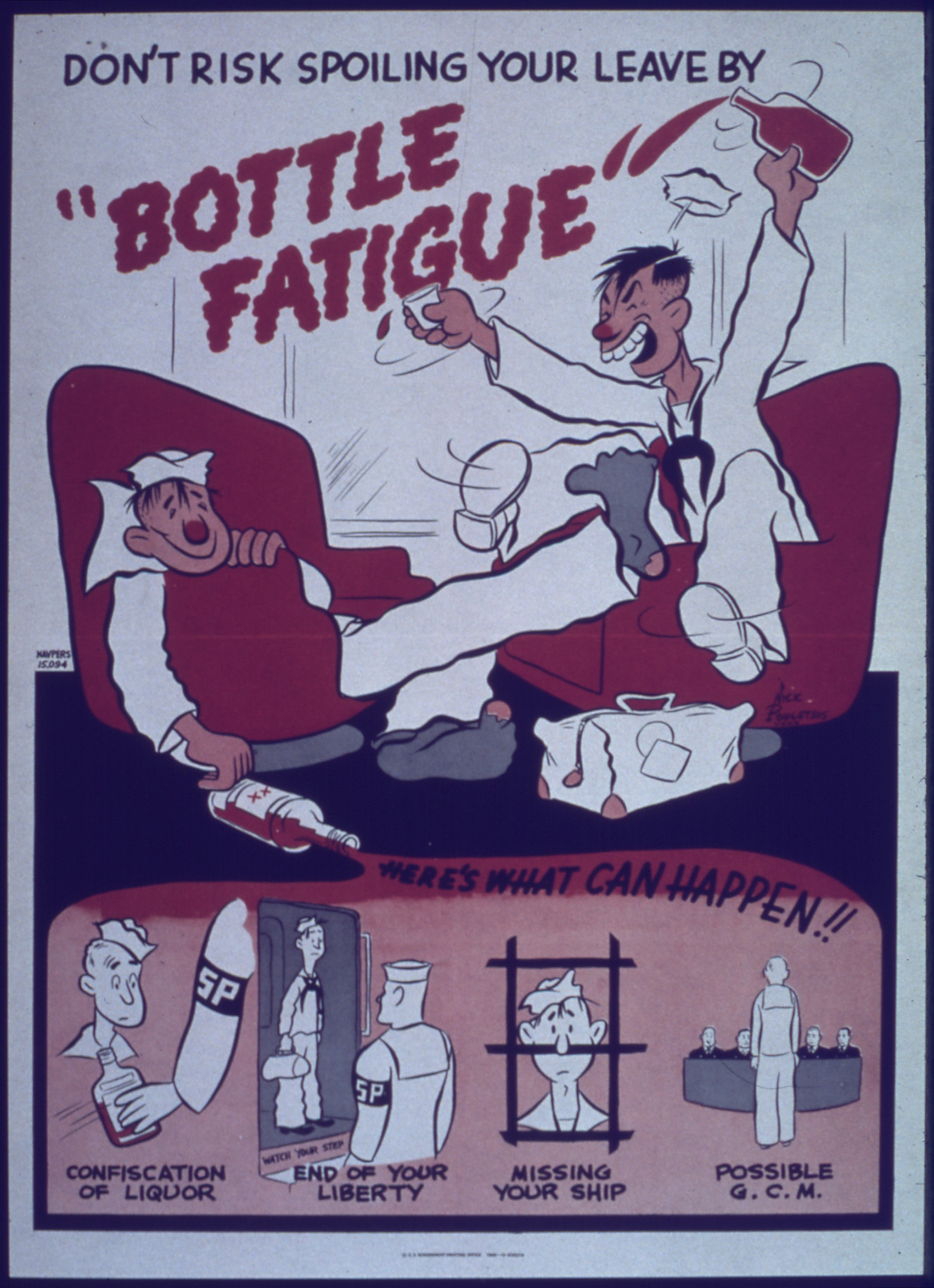
Don't Risk Spoiling Your Leave by Bottle Fatigue

In military forces, leave is a permission to be away from one's unit, either for a specified or unspecified period of time.

The term AWOL, standing for absent without leave, is a term for desertion used in the armed forces of many English-speaking countries.

Various militaries have specific rules that regulate leaves. British troops in World War I received leave for "Blighty" every 15 months.

"Block leave" is the time allotted to be spent with families independently of their units and where they must not report to their units while on rotation from their tours.

A furlough is an extended period of leave from front line service in order to return home. For example, during World War II New Zealand soldiers who had served overseas for long periods (usually three or more years) were granted a "furlough" for a visit home. These soldiers on leave were called "furlough men"

== See also ==
- Leave (U.S. military)
