= Cash (currency) =

One of several historical units of currency used in Asia

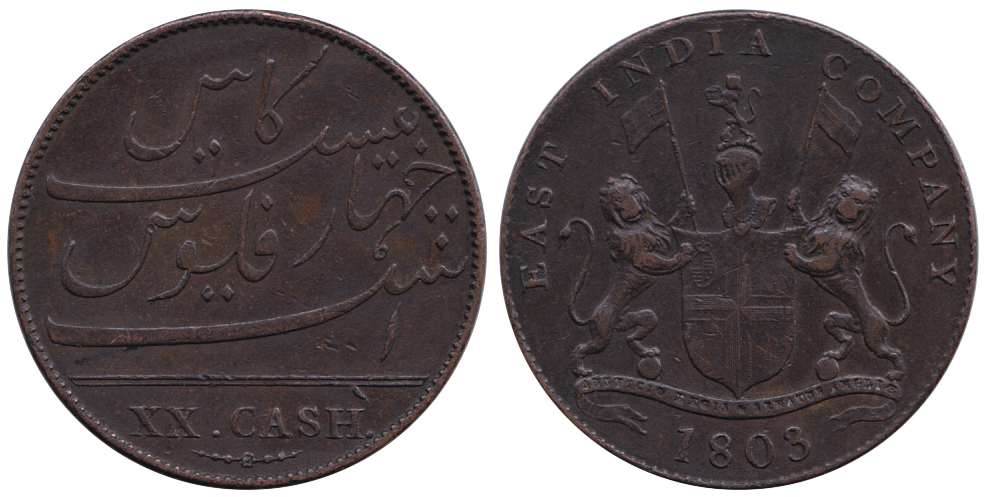
Pice (20 cash coin) from the East India Company's Madras Presidency (1803)

Cash is a name for several historical currencies used in Asia. It is applied to units used in China, Vietnam, and of Madras and Princely state of Travancore in British India. It is also occasionally used to refer to the Korean mun and the Japanese mon.

== Etymology ==
Tamil kācu/kāsu, Skr. karsha 'a weight of silver or gold equal to 1/400 of a tulā' (Williams). The early Portuguese writers represented the native word by cas, casse, caxa, the Fr. by cas, the Eng. by cass: the existing Pg. caixa and Eng. cash are due to a natural confusion with CASH n.1. From an early date the Portuguese applied caixa (probably on the same analogy) to the small money of other foreign nations, such as that of Maritime Southeast Asia, and especially the Chinese, which was also naturally made into cash in English. (Yule)" The English word "cash," meaning "tangible currency," is an older word from Middle French caisse.

== Chinese cash ==
In China, cash - not to be confused with the type of copper coin - refers to a unit used for centuries for copper coinage and banknote equivalents known as wén (文). Being the first country to implement paper based currency, in 1023 the 交子 paper money currency occur to adapt the economical climate change of globalization brought by fair trade via Silk Road, although metal coins were still in circulation. After the introduction of a unified currency system in 1889, cash continued to be used as a subunit of the yuan with 1000 cash being equal to one yuan. Coins continued to be denominated in cash until the 1920s nationally and for a time thereafter regionally.

== Vietnamese cash ==
Cash (văn) was a currency unit for copper coinage in Vietnam until the introduction of the French Indochina piastre in 1885 when it became a sub unit of the piastre usually known as a sapèque.

== Madras cash ==
Cash was a currency unit of Madras Province during the period of British rule in India. Specifically, it was a subunit of the fanam, rupee, and pagoda.

- 80 cash = 1 fanam
- 12 fanams = 1 rupee
- 42 fanams = 1 pagoda

Copper coins of 20 cash were called pice, 10 cash were called dodees, and 5 cash were called half dodees.

== Travancore cash ==
Travancore cash was similar to the Madras cash yet differed in the value compared to the rupee.

- 16 cash = 1 chakram
- 4 chakram = 1 fanam
- 7 fanam = 1 rupee

thus, 1 rupee = 448 cash.

== See also ==
- Cash (Chinese coin)
- List of English words of Sanskrit origin
- List of English words of Dravidian origin
