= Kasu =

Kasu may refer to:

- Kasu Brahmananda Reddy, former Chief Minister of Andhra Pradesh
  - Kasu Brahmananda Reddy National Park, national park in Hyderabad
- Kasu Krishna Reddy, minister in Andhra Pradesh
- Tonderai Kasu, Zimbabwean politician
- KASU, public radio station owned by Arkansas State University, Jonesboro, Arkansas
- Kaduna State University in Nigeria

== See also ==
- Cash (currency) or kasu, an obsolete Indian currency
