= Karsa, Kenya =

Karsa
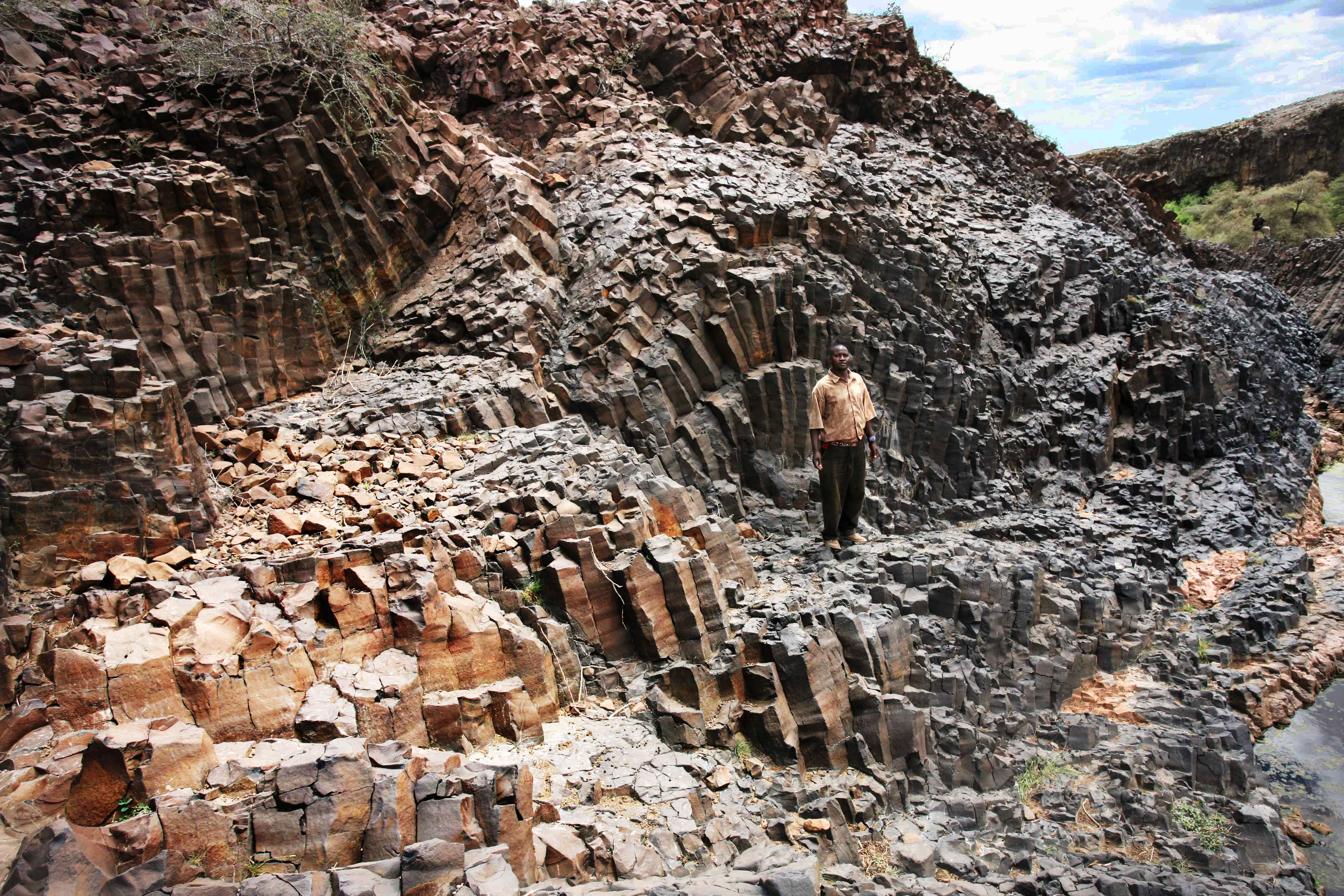
- Pliocene columnar basalt at Karsa watering hole, in Turkana, Kenya.
- Interactive map of Karsa
- Location: Marsabit, Turkana County, Kenya

Karsa, Kenya
- Location within Kenya
- Coordinates: 03°10′38″N 36°32′33″E

Karsa is a basalt geological formation, archaeological site, and watering hole in Turkana County, Kenya, on the southeast margin of Lake Turkana. Karsa volcanic flows lie at the base of important sedimentary formations in the Turkana Basin and are an example of columnar jointed basalt.

== Geology ==
Karsa is located in Turkana county, in Northern Kenya, east of Lake Turkana's Allia Bay, and south of Sibilot and Koobi Fora. The site is a part of the volcanic highlands at the foot of the Sibilot volcanic system, and is dominated by large, angular boulders that are derived from lava outcrops. Older volcanic, Karsa basalts date to 14 million years ago, during the Miocene, and are weathered in a spheroidal pattern. Two younger basalt flows date to 4.35 and 3.97 million years ago, during the Pliocene, and are jointed in a columnar pattern. Karsa basalts underlie the Koobi Fora formation, and just overlie a thin sedimentary sequence that includes molluscs.

== History ==
Karsa is a watering hole used by local wildlife in an otherwise barren landscape, and is an archaeological site where Late Stone Age microliths have been found. Karsa's location is advantageous for occupation because of its provision of water and elevated position overlooking the region.

In the 20th century, the Gabbra nomadic people used the Karsa formation as a watering hole for their animals, especially in times of water scarcity. Karsa was sometimes the target of flock raids. In the first half of the 20th century, Karsa stationed the British empire's King's African Rifles, and during the Second World War, became site of a police outpost for the Kenyan and British governments.

After the war, grazing controls were implemented at Karsa and in surrounding areas.

== See also ==
- Lake Turkana
- Mount Kulal
- Chalbi desert
- Marsabit
