= List of English words of Sanskrit origin =

This is a list of English words of Sanskrit origin. Most of these words were not directly borrowed from Sanskrit. The meaning of some words has changed slightly after being borrowed.

Both languages belong to the Indo-European language family and have numerous cognate terms; some examples are "mortal", "mother", "father" and the names of the numbers 1-10. However, this list is strictly of the words which are taken from Sanskrit.

== A ==
Ambarella
through Sinhala: ඇඹරැල්ලා æmbarællā ultimately from Sanskrit: अम्बरेल्ला, a kind of tree.
Aniline
through German: Anilin, French: Aniline and Portuguese: Anil from Arabic النيل al-nili and Persian نیلا nila, ultimately from Sanskrit नीली nili.
Aryan
from Sanskrit आर्य ārya, “which means noble; arya also means health. Noun of Arya is Aryana healthy, noble one” though it originally stems from the Proto-Indo-Iranian autonym *áryas. First attested in English in 1839, it was likely coined as a loan from earlier scholars in Europe writing in German and French who in turn borrowed directly from Sanskrit.

Ashwagandha
from ashva, for "horse", and gandha, for "smell", as the root has an Earthy horse-like musk.
Atoll
through Dhivehi : އަތޮޅު possibly from Sanskrit अन्तला antalā, interior, though there are other theories.
Aubergine
via Arabic بَاتِنْجَان bātinjān and Persian بادنجان bâdenjân ultimately from Sanskrit वातिगगम vātigagama, meaning eggplant or aubergine.
Avatar
from Sanskrit अवतार avatāra, which means "descent", an avatar refers to the human incarnation of God during times of distress on earth. Thus, Krishna and Rāma were both avatars of Vishnu, who also manifested himself as an avatar many other times, ten of which are considered the most significant.

== B ==
Bandana
from Sanskrit बन्धन bandhana, "a bond".
Banyan
from Hindi baniyaa ultimately from Sanskrit वणिज्‌ vaṇij, which means "a merchant".
Basmati
Type of long grain rice, highly valued for its smell and texture. Through Hindi बासमती ultimately from Sanskrit वास vāsa.
Bahuvrihi
from Sanskrit बहुव्रीहि Bahuvrihi, a composite word, meaning 'much rice'.
Bidi
through Hindi बीड़ी ultimately from Sanskrit वितिक vitika.
Bhakti
from Sanskrit भक्ति bhakti, portion or more importantly, devotion.
Brinjal
from Portuguese bringella or beringela, from Persian بادنجان badingān, probably from Sanskrit vātiṅgaṇa.
Buddha
from Sanskrit बुद्ध buddha, which means "awakened, enlightened", refers to Siddhartha Gautama, founder of Buddhism. Also refers to one who is enlightened in accordance with the teachings of Buddha or a likeness of Buddha.

== C ==
Candy
Middle English candi, crystallized cane sugar, short for sugre-candi, partial translation of Old French sucre candi, ultimately from Arabic sukkar qandī : sukkar, sugar + qandī, consisting of sugar lumps (from qand, lump of crystallized sugar, from an Indic source akin to Pali kaṇḍa-, from Sanskrit खाण्डक khaṇḍakaḥ, from khaṇḍaḥ, piece, fragment, perhaps of Munda origin).
Carmine and Crimson
From Arabic word Kirmiz (evolved in French later), from Sanskrit कृमि kṛmi meaning "bacteria".
Cashmere
1680s, "shawl made of cashmere wool", from the old spelling of Kashmir, Himalayan kingdom where wool was obtained from long-haired goats.
Chakram
from Sanskrit चक्रं Cakram, a circular throwing weapon, sharp edged discus. Chakram is derivative of word 'Chakra' which means Spiral or Circle
Cheetah
which is from Sanskrit चित्रस chitra-s "uniquely marked".
Chintz
from Hindi chint, from Sanskrit chitra-s "clear, bright".
Chukar
via Hindi चकोर cakor and Urdu چکور chukar ultimately from Sanskrit चकोर cakorah.
Chukker
from Hindi चक्कर and Urdu چکر chakkar, from Sanskrit चक्र cakra, "a circle, a wheel".
Citipati
from Sanskrit चिति पति citi-pati, which means "a funeral pyre lord".
Cot
from Hindi खाट khaat "a couch", which is from Sanskrit खट्वा khatva.
Copra
from Portuguese copra (16c.), from koppara (cognate with Hindi khopra) "mature coconut usually used for extraction of coconut oil"; related to Hindi khopri "skull", from Sanskrit kharparah "skull".
Cowrie
from Hindi कौड़ी kauri and Urdu کمتدب kauri, from Marathi कवडी kavadi, which is ultimately from Sanskrit कपर्द kaparda.
Crimson
from Old Spanish cremesin, via Medieval Latin cremesinus from Persian قرمز qirmiz "a kermes", which is ultimately from Sanskrit कृमिज krmija literally: "red dye produced by a worm".
Crocus
from Greek κρόκος krokos, via Semitic languages (e.g. Hebrew כרכום karkōm, Aramaic ܟܘܪܟܡܐ kurkama, Persian كركم kurkum, which mean saffron or saffron yellow); ultimately from Sanskrit कुङ्कुमं kunkumam.

== D ==
Dal
through Hindi दाल dāl ultimately from Sanskrit दल dala, meaning cotyledon of a pea pod, a type of Indian food; also refers to lentils.
Das
from Sanskrit दास daasa, a slave or servant. See also Dasa.
Datura
through Latin and Hindi: धतूरा dhatūra "jimson weed" ultimately from Sanskrit धत्तूरा dhattūrā, a kind of flowering plant.
Deodar
through Hindi देओदार deodār ultimately from Sanskrit देवदारु devadāru, a kind of tree.
Deva
from Sanskrit देव deva, which means "a god", akin to Latin deus, "god".
Devi
from Sanskrit देवी devi, which means "a goddess".
Dharma
from Sanskrit: धर्म dharma; akin to Latin: firmus, meaning "conformity to one's duty and nature" and "divine law" also "Religion".
Dhoti
via Hindi dhotī (Hindi: धोती) ultimately from Sanskrit dhautī (Sanskrit: धौती) which means 'to wash', a traditional male garment used in India. Material tied around the waist that covers most of the legs.
Dinghy
from Hindi दिन्गी dingi "a tiny boat", probably from Sanskrit द्रोण drona.
Dvandva
is a Sanskrit technical term literally meaning "a pair".

== G ==
Ganja
via Hindi गांजा (gaanja or "hemp"), ultimately from Sanskrit गञ्जा (gañjā or "hemp").
Gharry
via Hindi word gādī (Hindi: गाड़ी) which is ultimately derived from Sanskrit word garta (Sanskrit: गर्त) which means 'chariot'.
Ginger
from Old English gingifer, gingiber, from Late Latin gingiber, from Latin zingiberi, from Greek zingiberis, from Prakrit (Middle Indic) singabera, from Sanskrit श्रङ्गवेर śrngavera, from śrnga "horn" + vera- "body", although, it may have derived instead from Tamil word Inchi (இஞ்சி).
Gondwana
from two Sanskrit words, goṇḍa (Devanagari: गोण्ड) which means 'Gondi people or mountaineers' and vana (Devanagari: वन) which means 'forest'.
Guar
through Hindi गार ultimately from Sanskrit गोपाली gopālī, an annual legume.
Gunny
via Persian گونی "Gooni" a burlap sack and Hindi गोनी, ultimately from Sanskrit गोणी goni "sack".
Gurkha
via Nepalese गोर्खा ultimately from Sanskrit गोरक्ष goraksa, "a cowherd". Gurka derives from népali word Gorkha, followers of Saint Gorakhnath.
Guru
via Hindi गुरु ultimately from Sanskrit गुरु guru, which means "a teacher".

== J ==
Jackal
from Turkish çakal, from Persian شغال shaghal, from Middle Indic shagal, ultimately from Sanskrit शृगाल srgala "the howler".
Jaggery
via Portuguese jágara, jagre and Malayalam ഛക്കര chakkara, ultimately from Sanskrit शर्करा śarkarā.
Java
originally a kind of coffee grown on Java and nearby islands of modern Indonesia. By early 20c. it meant coffee generally. The island name is shortened from Sanskrit Yavadvipa "Island of Barley", from yava "barley" + dvipa "island".
Juggernaut
through Odia ଜଗନ୍ନାଥ Jagannatha ultimately from Sanskrit जगन्नाथ jagat-natha-s, which means "lord of the world".
Jungle
through Hindi जंगल jangal "a desert, forest"; also Persian جنگل jangal meaning forest; ultimately from Sanskrit जङ्गल jangala, which means "arid".
Jute
from Sanskrit जुत juta-s, which means "twisted hair".

== K ==
Karma

from Sanskrit कर्मन् (karman); which means "action".

Kedgeree

probably from Sanskrit कृशर (krśara).

Kermes

via French Kermès and Persian قرمز (qermez); perhaps ultimately from Sanskrit कृमिज (kṛmija); meaning "worm-made".

== L ==
Lac
through Urdu لاکھ, Persian لاک and Hindi लाख lakh from Prakrit लक्ख lakkha, ultimately from Sanskrit {lang|sa|लाक्षा}} lākṣā, meaning lac.
Lacquer
through French laque and Portuguese laca from Arabic لك lakk, लाख in Hindi, via Prakrit ultimately from Sanskrit लक्ष lakṣa.
Langur
through Hindi लुट lut probably ultimately from Sanskrit लङ्गूल langūla.
Lilac
via Arabic للك lilak from Persian نیلک nilak meaning "bluish", ultimately from Sanskrit नील nila, which means "dark blue".
Loot
ultimately from Sanskrit लुण्टा luṇṭā or लुण्ठति luṇṭhati meaning "he steals" through Hindi लूट lūṭ, which means "a booty, stolen thing".

== M ==
Maharajah
through Hindi महाराजा ultimately from Sanskrit महाराजा mahā-rājā, which means "a great king".
Maharani
through Hindi महारानी finally from Sanskrit महाराज्ञी mahārājnī, which means "consort of a maharajah".
Maharishi
from Sanskrit महर्षि maha-rishi, which means "a great sage".
Mahatma
from Sanskrit महात्मा mahatma, which means "a great breath, soul".
Mahayana
from Sanskrit महायान maha-yana, which means "a great vehicle".
Mahout
via Hindi माहुत (variant of महावत) ultimately from Sanskrit महामात्रः mahāmātrah.
Mandala
from Sanskrit मण्डल mandala, which means "a disc, circle".
Mandarin
via Portuguese mandarim, Dutch mandarijn, Malay mantri or menteri, and Hindi मंत्री mantri "a councillor" ultimately from Sanskrit मन्त्रिन् mantri, which means "an advisor".
Mantra
from Sanskrit मन्त्र mantra-s which means "a holy message or text".
Maya
from Sanskrit माया māyā, a religious term related with illusion.
Moksha
from Sanskrit मोक्ष moksha, liberation from the cycle of death and rebirth.
Mugger
via Hindi मगर and Urdu مگر magar ultimately from Sanskrit मकर makara ("sea creature"), like a crocodile, which attacks stealthily.
Mung bean
through Hindi मुग mū̃g and Pali/Prakrit मुग्ग mugga ultimately from Sanskrit मुद्ग mudga, a kind of bean.
Musk
via Middle English muske, Middle French Musc, Late Latin Muscus and Late Greek μόσχος moskhos from Persian موشک mushk, ultimately from Sanskrit मुस्क muska meaning "a testicle", from a diminutive of मुस mus ("mouse").
Mynah
through Hindi मैना maina ultimately from Sanskrit मदन madana-s, which means "love".

== N ==
Nainsook
through Hindi नैनसुख nainsukh ultimately from Sanskrit नयनसुख nayana-sukha, meaning "pleasing to the eyes".
Nard
through Old French narde and Latin nardus from Greek νάρδος nardos, perhaps ultimately from Sanskrit नलद nalada.
Narghile
through French Narguilé and Persian نارگيله nārghīleh ultimately from Sanskrit नारिकेल nārikela.
Nark
probably from Romany nak "a nose", via Hindi नाक nak ultimately from Sanskrit नक्र‌ nakra.
Neem
through Hindi नीम nīm ultimately from Sanskrit निम्ब nimba, a kind of tree.
Nilgai
through Hindi नीलगाय nīlgāy lit., blue cow ultimately from Sanskrit नीलगौ nīla-gau, an ox-like animal.
Nirvana
from Sanskrit निर्वाण nirvāṇa which means "ascendance, higher state of being, transcendence, state of bliss" literally means "extinction, disappearance".

== O ==
Opal
through French opalle from Latin opalus from Greek ὀπάλλιος opallios, probably ultimately from Sanskrit उपल upala.
Orange
through Old French orenge, Medieval Latin orenge and Italian arancia from Arabic نارنج naranj, via Persian نارنگ narang and Sanskrit नारङ्ग naranga-s meaning "an orange tree", derived from proto-Dravidian.

== P ==
Pal
1788, from Romany (English Gypsy) pal "brother, comrade", variant of continental Romany pral, plal, phral, probably from Sanskrit bhrata "brother"
Palanquin
via Odia word pālankī (Odia:ପାଲଙ୍କି) which is ultimately derived from Sanskrit पल्यङ्क palyanka which means 'bed' or 'couch'.
Parcheesi
1800, from Hindi pachisi, from pachis "twenty-five" (highest throw of the dice), from Sanskrit panca "five"
Pepper
Old English pipor, from an early West Germanic borrowing of Latin piper "pepper", from Greek piperi, probably (via Persian) from Middle Indic pippari, from Sanskrit pippali "long pepper".
Pandit
via Sanskrit पण्डित paṇḍita, meaning "learned one or maestro". Modern Interpretation is a person who offers to mass media their opinion or commentary on a particular subject area.

== R ==
Raita
ultimately from Sanskrit राजिका rājikā via Hindi रायता rāytā, a south Asian condiment and side dish made of yogurt and vegetables.
Raj
through Hindi राज and Pali/Prakrit रज्ज rajja ultimately from Sanskrit राज्य rājya, which means "a king" or "kingdom". Raj means kingdom or domain of a ruler.
Rajah
through Hindi राज from Sanskrit राजन् rājān, which means "a king".
Ramtil
through Hindi ultimately from Sanskrit रामतिल rāmatila, which means "a dark sesame".
Rani
through Hindi रानी ultimately from Sanskrit राज्ञी rājnī, a queen, a consort of a rajah.
Rice
via Old French ris and Italian riso from Latin oriza, which is from Greek ὄρυζα oryza, through an Indo-Iranian tongue finally from Sanskrit व्रीहि vrihi "rice", ultimately derived from proto-Dravidian arisi.
Rupee
through Hindi रुपया rupiyā ultimately from Sanskrit रूप्यक rūpyaka, an Indian silver coin.

== S ==
Saccharide
via Latin Saccharon and Greek σάκχαρον from Pali सक्खर sakkharā, ultimately from Sanskrit शर्करा sarkarā.
Sambal
through Afrikaans, Indonesian and Tamil சம்பல் campāl ultimately from Sanskrit सम्बार sambhārei.
Sambar
through Hindi ultimately from Sanskrit शंबरः śambarah, a kind of Asian deer.
Sandalwood
via Middle English sandell, Old French sandale, Medieval Latin sandalum, Medieval Greek σανδάλιον sandalion (diminutive of σάνδαλον sandalon) and Arabic and Persian صندل; ultimately from Sanskrit चन्दन candana meaning "wood for burning incense".
Sapphire
via Old French saphir, Latin sapphirus and Greek σάπφειρος sappheiros from a Semitic tongue (cf. Hebrew: ספיר sapir); possibly the ultimate origin is Sanskrit शनिप्रिय sanipriya which literally means "sacred to Saturn (Shani)".
Sari
through Hindi साड़ी sari and Prakrit सदि sadi, finally from Sanskrit सति sati "garment".
Shampoo
via Anglo-Indian shampoo and Hindi चाँपो champo from Sanskrit चपयति capayati, which means "kneads".
Shawl
from Persian شال shal, finally from Sanskrit शाटी śāṭī, which means "a strip of cloth".
Singapore
via Malay Singapura ultimately from Sanskrit सिंहपुर simhapura, literally "the lion city".
Sri Lanka
from Sanskrit: श्री लंका which means "venerable island". It is said that Shree or Lakshmi, the Goddess of wealth, resides there.
Sugar
through Old French sucre, Italian zucchero, Medieval Latin succarum, Arabic: سكر sukkar and Persian: شکر shakar ultimately from Sanskrit शर्करा śarkara which means "ground or candied sugar" (originally "grit" or "gravel").
Sunn
via Hindi: सुन्न ultimately from Sanskrit: सन sāna, a kind of Asian plant.
Swami
through Hindi स्वामी swami ultimately from Sanskrit स्वामी svami, which means "a master".
Swastika
from Sanskrit स्वस्तिक svastika, a religious symbol associated rituals and divination. Swastika means "one associated with well-being, a lucky charm".

== T ==
Taka
via Maithili and Bengali : টাকা from Sanskrit टङ्क tanka.
Talipot
through Hindi, Indonesian and Malay talipat from Sanskrit तालपत्र tālapatra, a kind of palm.
Tank
a word originally brought by the Portuguese from India, from a Hindi source, such as Gujarati tankh "cistern, underground reservoir for water", Marathi tanken, or tanka "reservoir of water, tank". Perhaps ultimately from Sanskrit tadaga "pond, lake pool", and reinforced in later sense of "large artificial container for liquid".
Tendu
via Hindi ultimately from Sanskrit तैन्दुक tainduka.
Teapoy
via Hindi तिपाई tipāi and Urdu تپائي tipāʼī,which originated as a Sanskrit compound: त्रि (trí, "three") and पाद (pā́da, "foot").
Thug
through Marathi ठग thag probably ultimately from Sanskrit स्थग sthaga, which means "a scoundrel".
Til
from Sanskrit तिलः tilah, a kind of plant.
Toddy
through Hindi तरी tari ultimately from Sanskrit तल tala-s, a Dravidian origin is also probable.
Toon
through Hindi तुन tūn ultimately from Sanskrit तुन्न tunna, a kind of tree.
Tope
through Hindi टॉप ṭop probably from Prakrit थुपो thūpo, finally from Sanskrit स्तूप stūpa.
Tutty
through Middle English tutie, Old French, Medieval Latin tūtia, Arabic توتي tūtiyā, and Persian توتیا ultimately from Sanskrit तुत्थ tuttha meaning "blue vitriol", a Dravidian origin is also probable.

== V ==
Vina

ultimately from Sanskrit वीणा(vīṇā) through Hindi वीणा(vīṇā); referring to a kind of musical instrument.

== W ==
Wanderoo

through වන්ඩෙරූ (vanḍerū) finally from Sanskrit वानर(vānara), meaning a kind of monkey.

== Y ==
Yoga

through Sanskrit योग(yoga-s), which means "yoke, union".

Yogi

through Hindi योगी(yogi) from Sanskrit योगी(yogi); meaning one who practices yoga or ascetic.

== Z ==
Zen

through Japanese 禅 and Chinese 禪 Chán ultimately from Pali झान(jhāna) and Sanskrit ध्यान (dhyana), which means "a meditation".

== See also ==
- Greater India
- Hobson-Jobson
- Indianization
- Indo-European vocabulary
- Indian English
- List of Hindu deities
- Lists of English words by country or language of origin
- Sanskritization
