= Kerchief =

Cloth tied around the head or neck; bandana

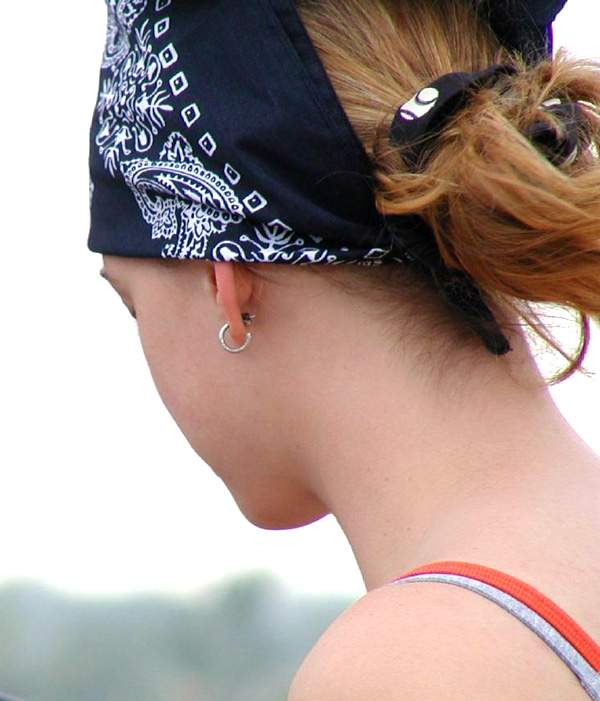
A woman wearing a blue bandana on her head

A kerchief (from the Old French couvre-chef, "cover head"), also known as a bandana or bandanna, is a triangular or square piece of cloth tied around the head, face, or neck for protective or decorative purposes. The popularity of head kerchiefs may vary by culture or religion, often being used as a Christian headcovering by men and women of the Anabaptist, Eastern Orthodox, and Plymouth Brethren denominations, as well as by some Orthodox Jewish and Muslim men and women and is also considered a hat.

== Types ==
=== Bandana ===
A bandana or bandanna (from Hindi and Urdu, ultimately from Sanskrit बन्धन or bandhana, "a bond") is a type of large, usually colourful kerchief, originating from the Indian subcontinent, often worn on the head or around the neck of a person. Bandanas are frequently printed in a paisley pattern and are most often used to hold hair back, either as a fashionable head accessory or for practical purposes. It is also used to tie around the neck to prevent sunburn, and around the mouth and nose to protect against dust inhalation or to hide the wearer's identity.

The word bandana stems from the Hindi words 'bāndhnū', or "tie-dyeing", and 'bāndhnā', "to tie". These stem from Sanskrit roots 'badhnāti', "he ties", and Sanskrit 'bandhana' (बन्धन), "a bond". In the 18th and 19th centuries bandanas were frequently known as bandannoes.

Bandanas originated in India as brightly colored handkerchiefs of silk and cotton, with white spots on colored grounds, chiefly red and blue, known as Bandhani. The silk styles were made of the finest-quality yarns and were popular. Bandana prints for clothing were first produced in Glasgow from cotton yarns, and are now made in many qualities. The term, at present, generally means a fabric in printed styles, whether silk, silk and cotton, or all cotton.

The bandana gained popularity in the US during the late 1700s because snuff users preferred colored and patterned silk handkerchiefs over white ones, as the former hid tobacco stains better when they blew their noses. In the late 18th and early 19th centuries, bandanas began to appear with political and military advertisements printed on them. Such printed bandanas were common in the early and mid-1900s during World War I and World War II. Decorative bandanas were also common gear, particularly as neckwear, for cowboys, and so for country and western entertainers such as Roy Rogers and, later, Willie Nelson. The latter singer began wearing bandanas when he moved from Nashville back to Austin, Texas, "just in time to catch the hippie wave cresting at counterculture center the Armadillo World Headquarters".

Around the same time, bandanas also became popular with motorcyclists, particularly with Harley-Davidson riders and bikers. In the 1970s paisley bandanas also became popular amongst gangs in California, most notably with two well-known rival gangs, the Bloods, who wore red bandanas, and the Crips, who wore blue ones.

Green bandanas have become a symbol of the abortion-rights movement.

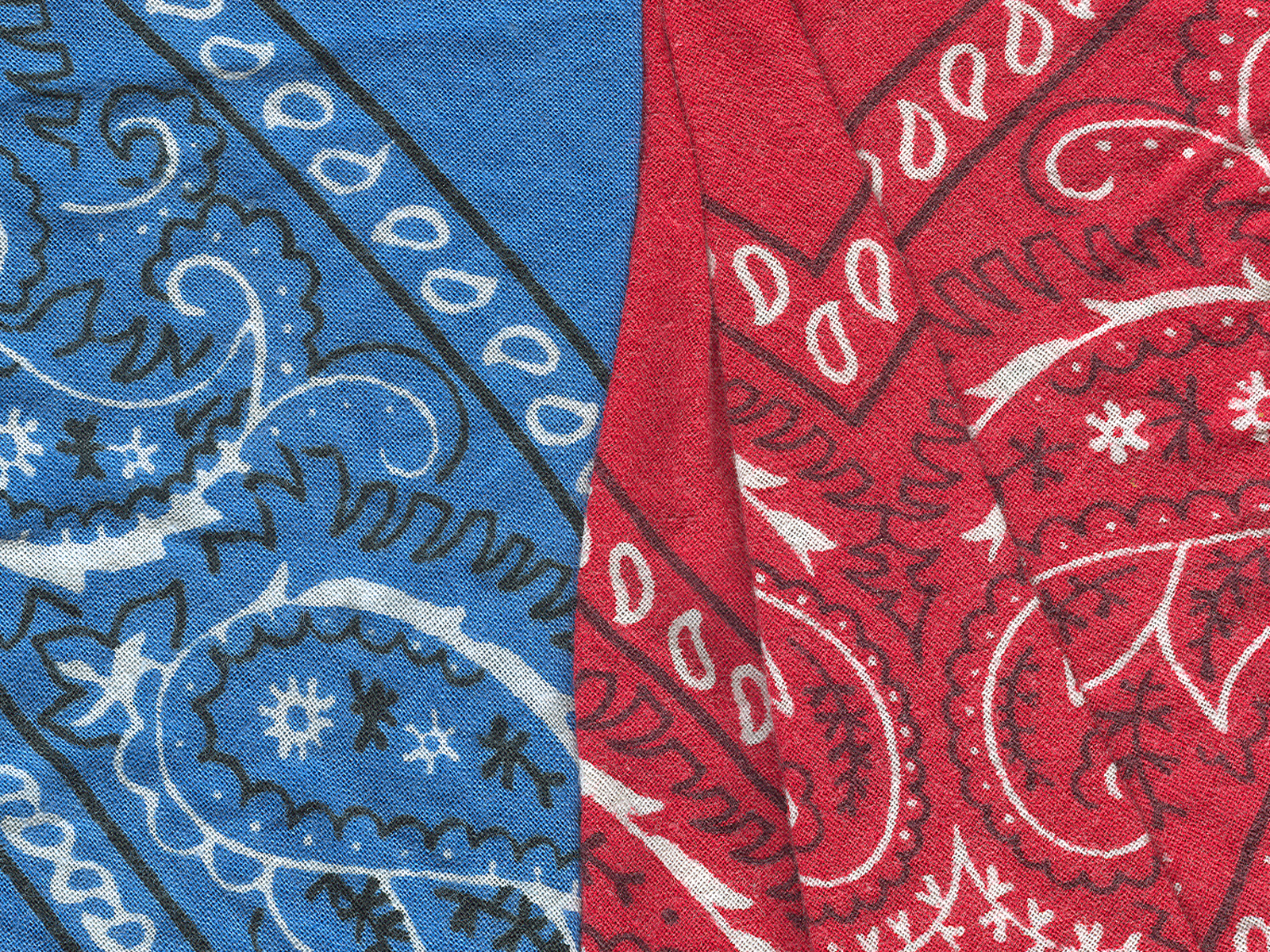
Red and blue bandanas in traditional paisley patterns

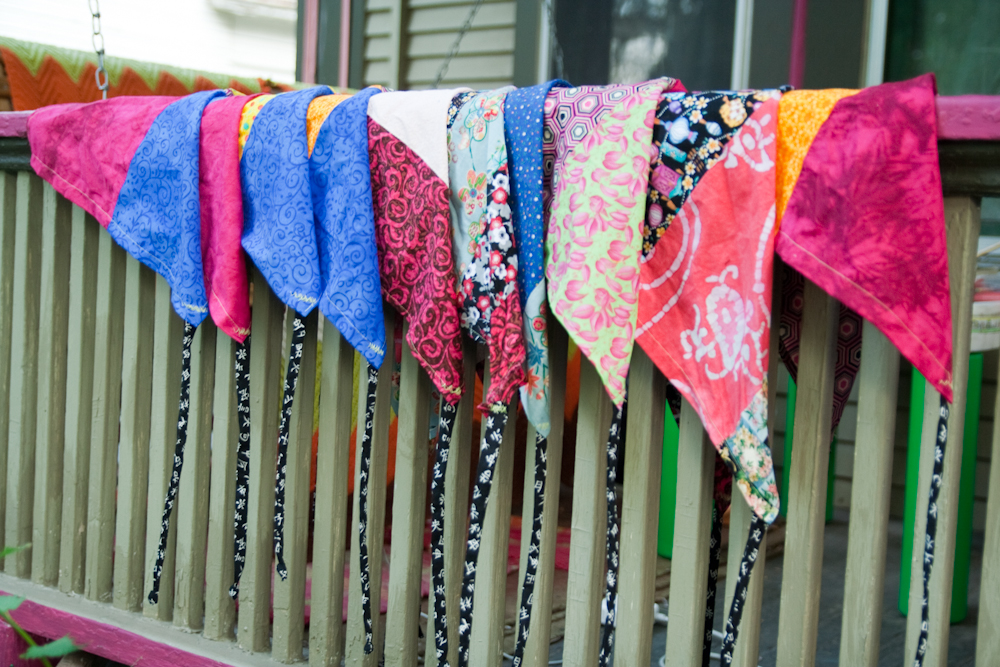
Bandanas are produced in a variety of colors and designs.

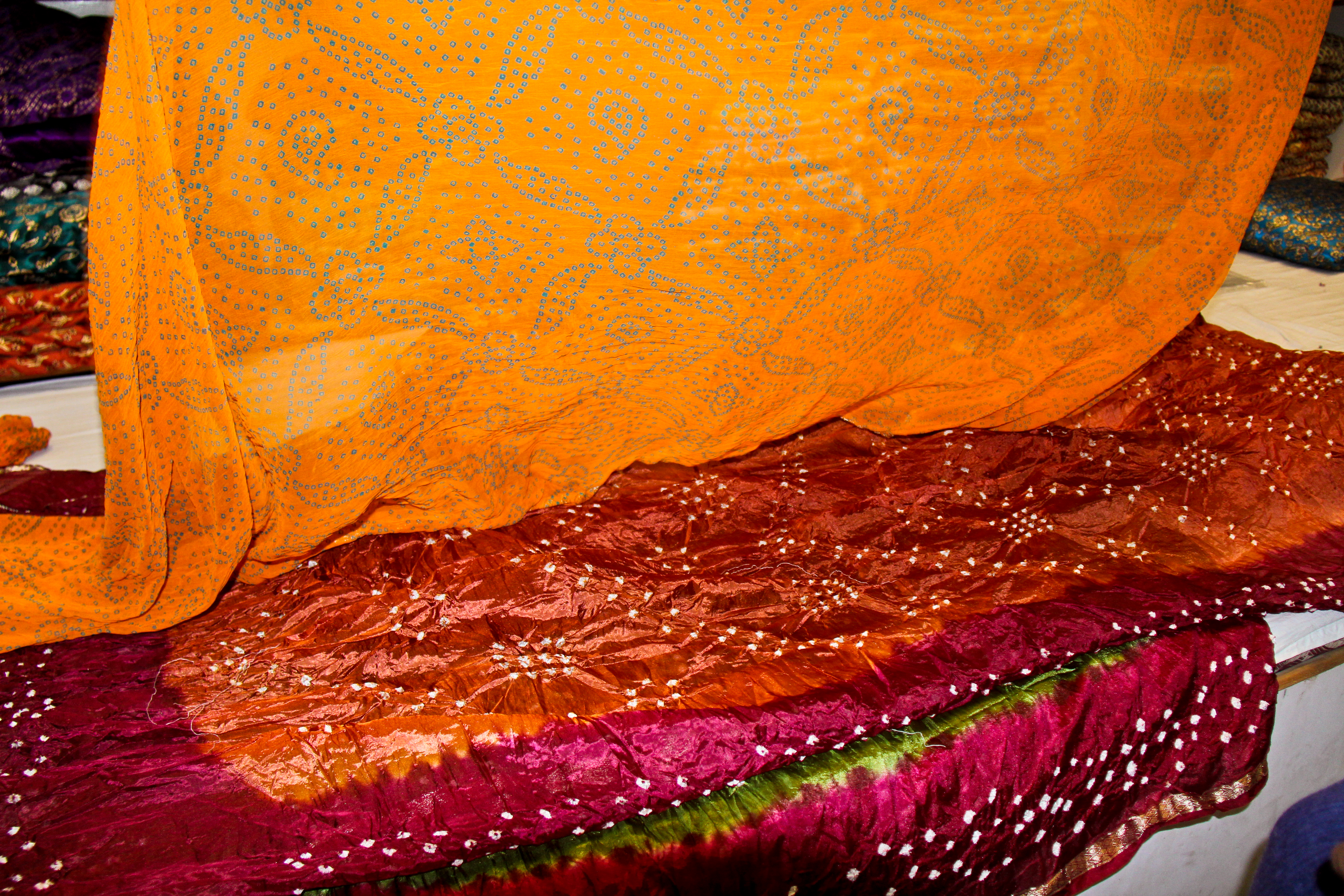
Bandhani

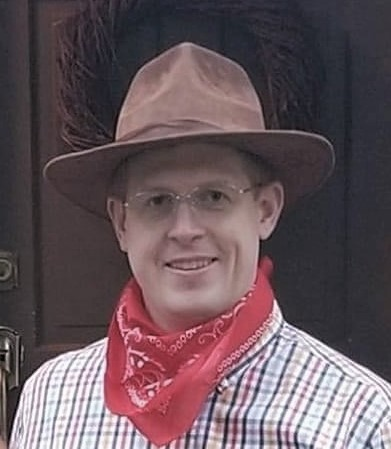
A man wearing a bandana around his neck

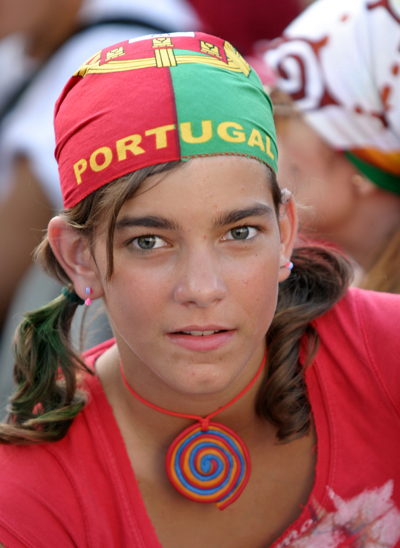
A girl wearing a bandana on her head to support Portugal in football in the colors of that country's flag

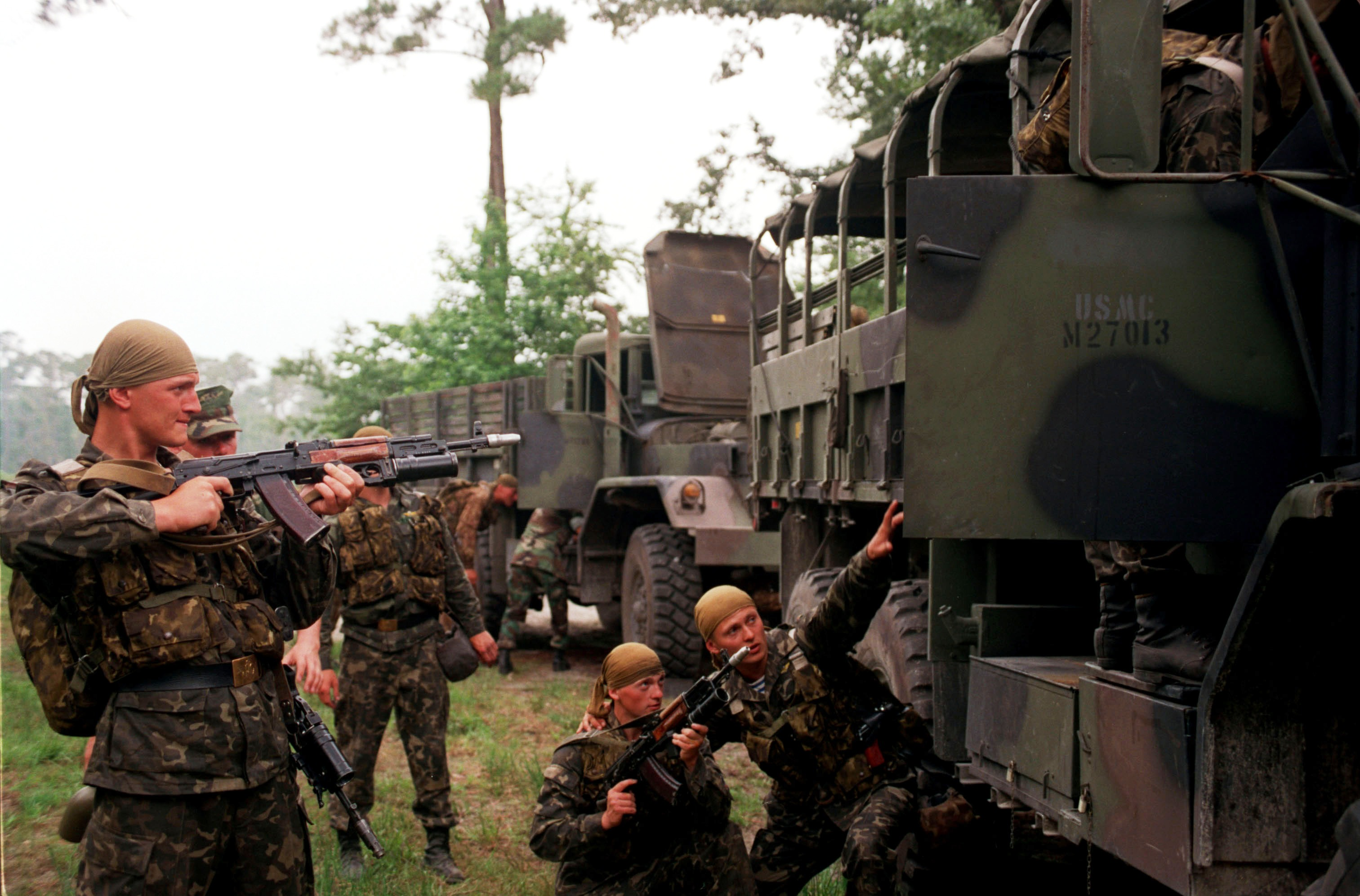
Ukrainian army soldiers wearing bandanas during a military exercise

=== Oramal ===
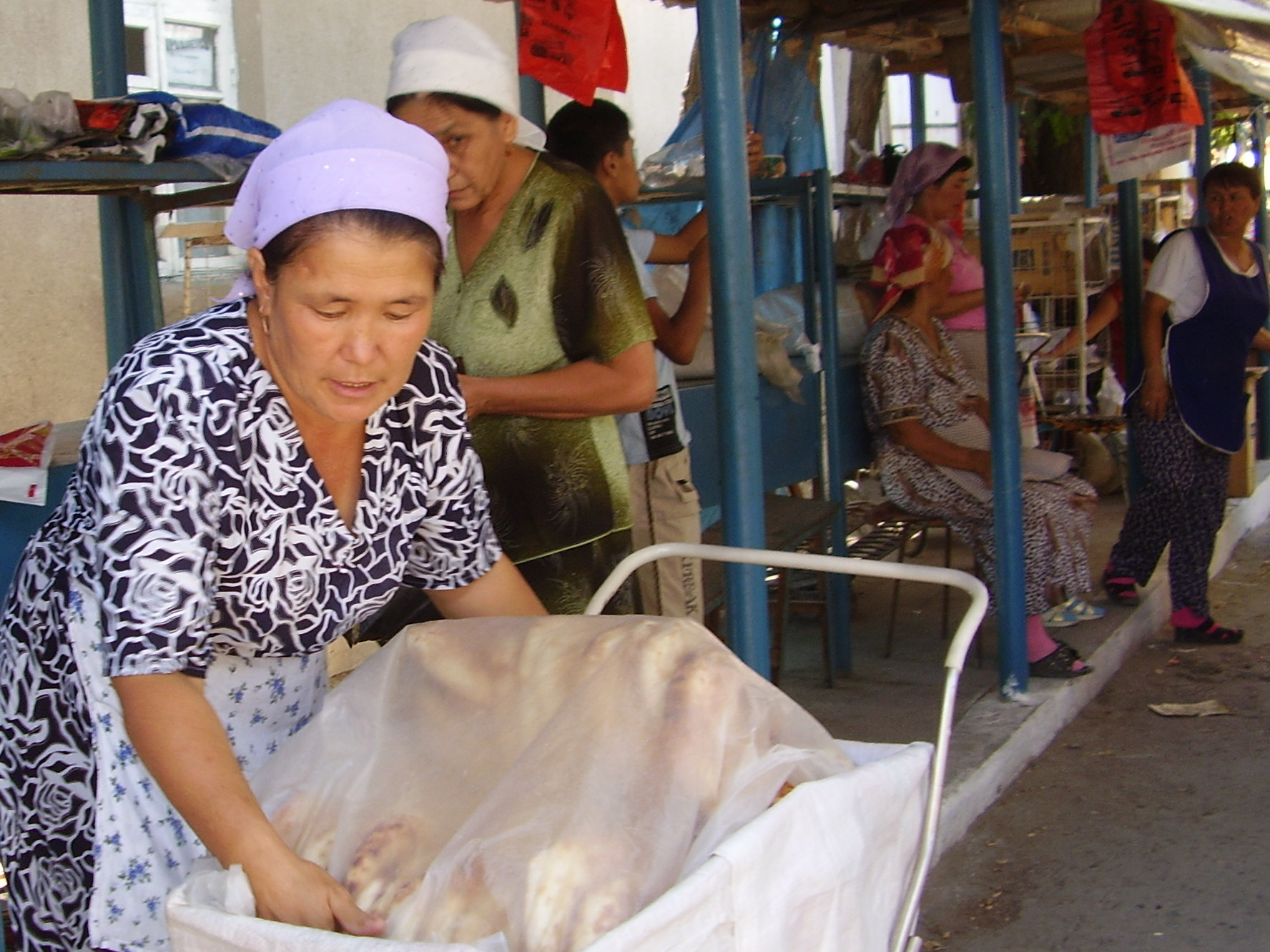
Oramal

An oramal is a traditional kerchief used in Central Asia and the Caucasus. It usually does not cover the neck. In countries such as Uzbekistan, it is mostly used at home, while the paranja is more popular in public. In countries like Kazakhstan, where the oramal is emblematic of married women, it is commonly worn in public. In Kyrgyzstan, white indicates that a woman is married.

Oramals are often used by men when riding horses in summertime instead of a cap (cf. bandana of bikers).

=== Austronesian headscarves ===
Kerchiefs are also worn as headdresses by Austronesian cultures in maritime Southeast Asia. Among Malay men, it is known as tengkolok and is worn during traditional occasions, such as weddings (worn by the groom) and the pesilat.

== See also ==
- Handkerchief
- Handkerchief code

Other neckwear

- Ascot tie
- Cravat
- Fichu
- Neckerchief
- Pañuelo
- Scarf
- Shawl

Other headwear

- Do-rag
- Hachimaki
- Headband
- Headscarf
- Hijab
- Keffiyeh
- Tengkolok
- Tignon

== Additional sources ==
- Hilger, Laura (November 2020). "The Global History of the Bandana". Smithsonian Magazine.
- Yule, Henry, & A. C. Burnell (2013). Hobson-Jobson: The Definitive Glossary of British India. Oxford, England: Oxford University Press. ISBN 9780191645839.
