= Arthur Coke Burnell =

English Indologist (1840–1882)

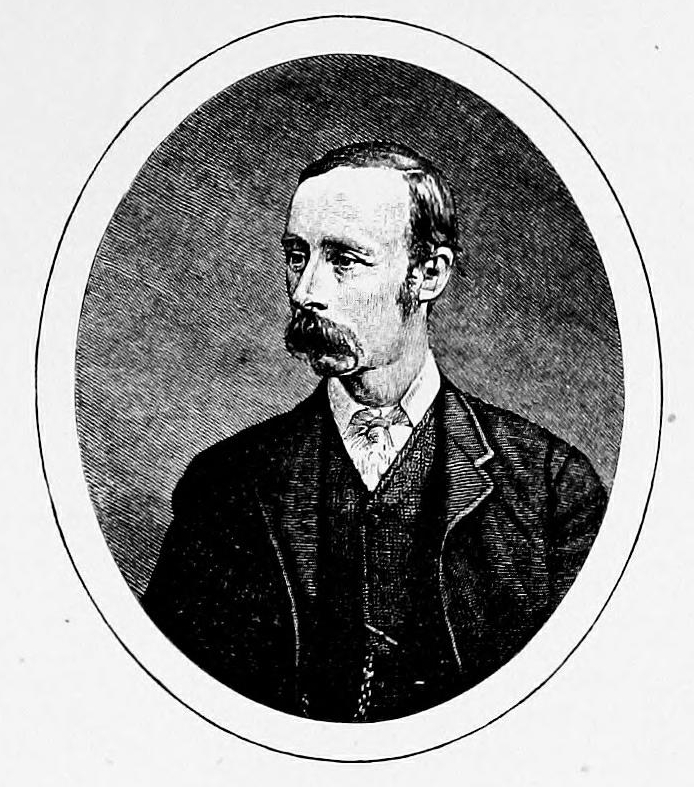
Arthur Coke Burnell

Arthur Coke Burnell (11 July 1840 – 12 October 1882) was an English civil servant who served in the Madras Presidency who was also a scholar in Sanskrit and Dravidian languages. He catalogued the Sanskrit manuscripts in southern India, particularly those in the collections of the Tanjore court collections. He was, with Henry Yule, a co-compiler of the Hobson-Jobson, a compendium of Anglo-Indian terms.

== Life ==
Burnell was born at St. Briavels, Gloucestershire, the first son of Arthur Burnell who worked in the East India Company and Mary Agnes, née Coke. A grand-uncle was William Coke. He was educated at Bedford School, and then went to King's College, London, where a meeting with Professor Viggo Fausböll of Copenhagen led him to an early interest in Indology. He took the examination for the Indian Civil Services in 1857 and after studies in Sanskrit and Telugu with Theodor Goldstücker went to take up a post in the Madras Presidency in 1860. In the course of positions across peninsular India, he began to acquire or copy Sanskrit manuscripts. Poor health made his return to England and he published the Catalogue of a Collection of Sanskrit MSS (1869) in England. He returned to India to serve as a judge in Mangalore and then Tanjore. Among his significant contributions was the deciphering of the Pahlavi inscription at St Thomas Mount which made him date it to the 8th century AD.

In 1875 Edward Lear visited Burnell (noted as "Burnall") in Tanjore. In 1876 Burnell visited Java and met Miss Marianne North who had been referred to him by Lear, inviting her to Tanjore the next year. Burnell himself took an interest in Indian trees and collected many sacred plants for North.

His constitution, never strong, broke down several times. He suffered cholera, and partial paralysis. Towards the end of his life he lived in San Remo and travelled across northern Italy. He returned to England in 1882 and died at his brother's home in West Stratton, Hampshire. He was buried in the churchyard of Micheldever. A collection of Sanskrit manuscripts was purchased from his heirs by the India Office library after his death.

== Works ==
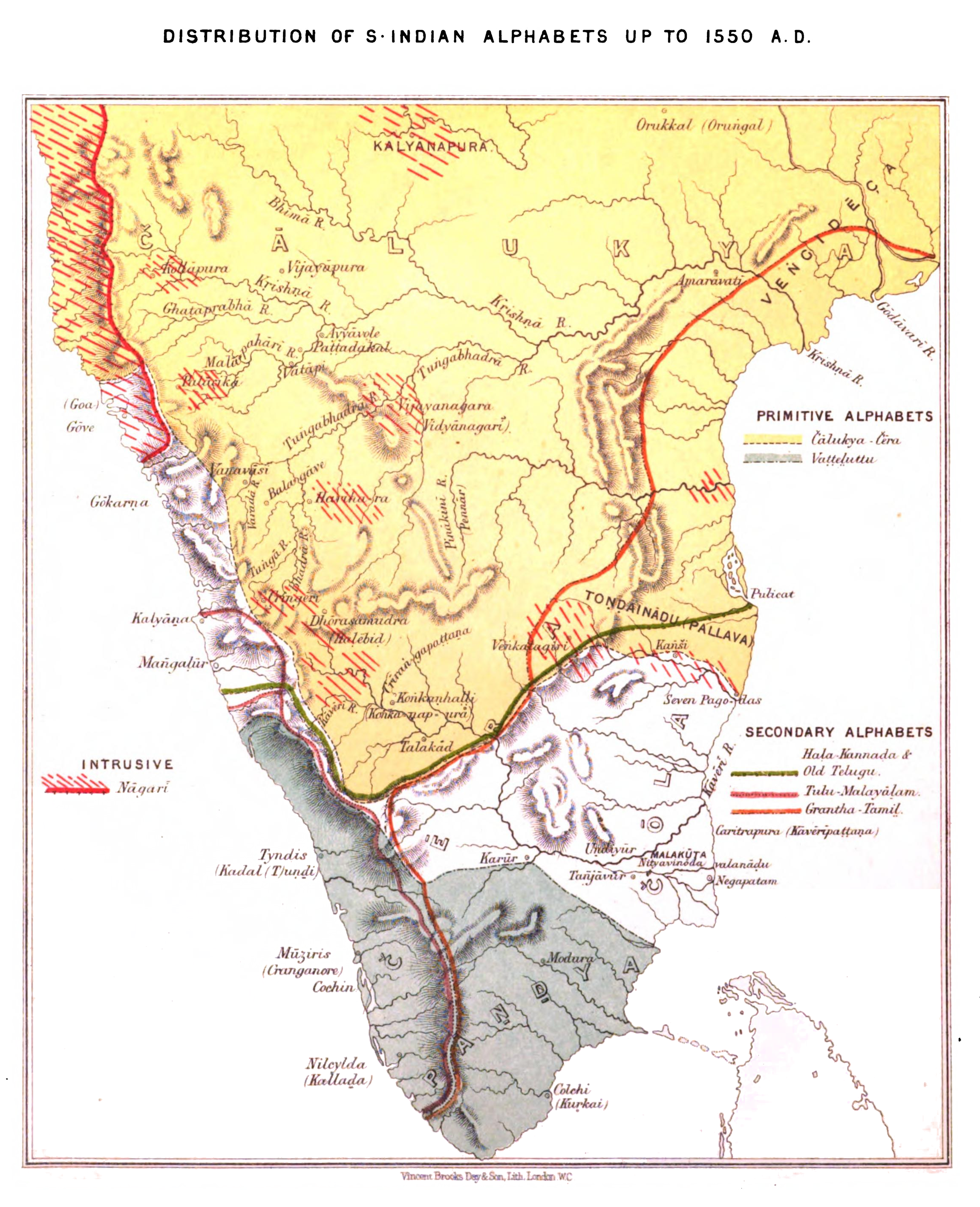
Burnell's map of south Indian scripts

In 1874, Burnell published a Handbook of South Indian Palaeography, characterized by Max Müller as "an avenue through one of the thickest and darkest jungles of Indian archaeology, and is so full of documentary evidence, that it will long remain indispensable to every student of Indian literature". He received an honorary doctorate from the University of Strasbourg. In 1880 he compiled, with the encouragement of Lord Napier, the Classified Index to the Sanskrit MSS in the Palace at Tanjore. The Tanjore collection was estimated by Burnell as being the work of nearly 300 years begun by the Tanjore rajas and continued by the Maratha rulers. He was also the author of a large number of translations from, and commentaries on, various other Sanskrit manuscripts, being particularly successful in grouping and elucidating the essential principles of Hindu law. These included Madhava's Commentary on the Parâśarasmriti (1868), The law of partition and succession, from the manuscript Sanskrit text of Vaṛadarâja's Vyavahâranirṇaya, Specimens of South Indian Dialects, Clavis humaniorum litterarum sublimioris Tamulici idiomatis (1876), and The Aindra School of Sanskrit Grammarians (1875). He published many papers in the Indian Antiquary journal. He also published on the history of the Portuguese in India.

In addition to his exhaustive acquaintance with Sanskrit, and the southern Indian languages, he had some knowledge of Tibetan, Arabic, Kawi, Javanese and Coptic. Burnell originated with Sir Henry Yule the dictionary of Anglo-Indian words and phrases, the Hobson-Jobson.

A list of his publications included his own books as well as notes and translations in the works of other collaborators:

- Dayavibhaga. The Law of Inheritance. From the published Sanskrit texts of the- Vyahavaharakanda of the Madhaviya Commentary of the Paracarasmriti. Madias, 1868.
- Catalogue of a Collection of Sanskrit MSS., Part I. Vedic MSS., with many extracts. Madras, 1869.
- A few Suggestions as to the best way of making and utilizing Copies of Indian Inscriptions. Madras, 1870.
- The Law of Partition and Succession. From the MS. Sanskrit text of Varadaraja's Vyahavaharanimaya. Mangalore, 1872.
- Specimens of South Indian Dialects, consisting of versions of the Parable of the Sower (St. Matthew xiii. 1-34), with Grammatical and Ethnographical Introductions.
  - In the Konkani Dialect spoken by the Roman Catholics of South Canara. Mangalore, 1872. Second Edition, Mangalore, 1873
  - In the Dialect of Malayalim spoken by the Mappilas of South Canara, and of Amindivi (Laccadivo) Islands. In the Mappila-Arabic characters and in Lepsius's Standard Alphabet. 1873.
  - In the Kodagu (Coorg) Language, by the Rev. R Kittel. 1873.
  - In the Tanjore Dialect of Tamil. Tranquebar, 1873.
  - In the Language of the Todas (Nilagiri Hills), by the Rev. F. Metz. 1873.
  - In the Dialect of Canarese spoken by the Badagas of the Nilagiri Hills, by the same. 1873.
  - In the Dialect of Konkani spoken by the Sarasvat Brahmins of South Canara.
  - In the Kundapur Dialect of Canarese.
  - In the Tanjore Tamil-Brahman Dialect. Tranquebar, 1877.
- Ethnography of the S.W. Frontier of the Aryan and Dravidian races. 1873.
- The Samavidhana Brahmana of the Sama-Veda, edited with the Commentary of Sayana, an English Translation, Introduction and Indexes. Vol.I. containing the Text, with an introduction. London, 1873.
- The Vamsa Brahmana of the Sama-Veda, with an introduction on Sayana's life and works, his Commentary and Index. 8 vo. Mangalore, 1872.
- The Devatadhyaya Brahmana of the Sama Veda with Sayana's Commentary, Index, &c. 1873.
- On some Pahlavi Inscriptions in S. India. Mangalore, 1873.
- Elements of South Indian Palaeography. Mangalore, 1874. 2nd Edition, Mangalore, 1878.
- Dayadasasloki, with Translation. Mangalore, 1875.
- On the Aindra School of Sanskrit Grammarians. Mangalore, 1875.
- Arsheya Brahmana of the Sama-Veda, with Extracts from Sayana's Commentary, an Introduction and Index of Words. Mangalore, 1876.
- The Samhitopanishad Brahmana of the Sama-Veda, with an anonymous Commentary. 1877.
- A legend from the Jalavahara or Jaiminiya Brahmana. 1878.
- The Jaiminiya Text of the Arsheya Brahmana. 1878.
- The Riktantravyakarana, a Pratisakhya of the Sama-Veda. Part 1, containing Text, Introduction and Indexes. 1879.
- Classified Index to the Sanskrit MSS. in the Palace at Tanjore. Prepared for the Madras Government. 4 to. Pts. 1–3. 1879–1880.
- Tentative list of Books and MSS. relating to the History of the Portuguese in India Proper. Mangalore.
