= Hobson-Jobson =

1886 dictionary of Anglo-Indian English

Hobson-Jobson: A Glossary of Colloquial Anglo-Indian Words and Phrases, and of Kindred Terms, Etymological, Historical, Geographical and Discursive is a historical dictionary of Anglo-Indian words and terms from Indian languages which came into use during British rule in India.

It was written by Sir Henry Yule and Arthur Coke Burnell and first published in 1886. Burnell died before the work was finished, and most of it was completed by Yule, who acknowledged Burnell's detailed contributions. A subsequent edition was edited by William Crooke in 1903, with extra quotations and an index added. The first and second editions are collector's items; the second edition is widely available in facsimile.

The dictionary holds over 2,000 entries, generally with citations from literary sources, some of which date to the first European contact with the Indian subcontinent, frequently in other non-English European languages. Most entries also have etymological notes.

== Background ==
The project began through correspondence between Sir Henry Yule, who was then living in Palermo, and Arthur Coke Burnell, who was a member of the Madras Civil Service, and was holding posts in several places in South India, and particularly, in Thanjavur. In 1872, Burnell wrote to Yule that he had been collecting instances of Anglo-Indian usages of English, as Yule had also been working on a similar list of his own. At Yule's suggestion, they combined their projects, working together until Burnell's death in 1882. Yule and Burnell compiled the text by using a variety of sources, including accounts of Anglo-Indian language and usages by other authors of the time, as well as government documents such as glossaries of revenue administrative and legislative terms, and contemporary dictionaries.

== Title ==
In Indian English, the term Hobson-Jobson referred to any festival or entertainment, but especially ceremonies of the Mourning of Muharram. In origin, the term is a corruption by British soldiers of "Yā Ḥasan! Yā Ḥosain!" which is repeatedly chanted by Shia Muslims throughout the procession of the Muharram; this was then converted to Hosseen Gosseen, Hossy Gossy, Hossein Jossen and, ultimately, Hobson-Jobson. Yule and Burnell wrote that they considered the title a "typical and delightful example" of the type of highly domesticated words in the dictionary that also implied their own dual authorship.

The scholar Traci Nagle, however, also finds a note of condescension in the choice. Rhyming reduplication (as in "Hobson-Jobson" or "puli kili") is highly productive in South Asian languages, yielding echo words. In English, however, rhyming reduplication is generally either juvenile (as in Humpty Dumpty or hokey-pokey) or pejorative (as in namby-pamby or mumbo-jumbo); further, Hobson and Jobson were stock characters in Victorian times, used to indicate a pair of yokels, clowns, or idiots. The title thus produced negative associations – being at best self-deprecatory on the part of the authors, suggesting themselves a pair of idiots – and reviewers reacted negatively to the title, generally praising the book but finding the title inappropriate. Indeed, anticipating this reaction, the title was kept secret – even from the publisher – until shortly before publication.

== Influence and evaluations ==
The volume received praise on its initial publication from, among others, Rudyard Kipling. Paul Pelliot, the French Sinologist, welcomed the 1903 version, though including a list of corrections and questions.

More recently, however, the scholar Vijay Mishra objected that neither Yule nor Burnell had sound training in the languages required. He further objected that "it may be said that built into these hobson-jobsons is a contemptuous attitude, an ironic belittling of the values contained in the original vernacular words". That is, the British colonialists represented in the volume did not know or care to know the original meanings of the words. He gives as an example the word "babu" (babú) which in the original is "an educated or distinguished person" and a term of respect. But as a hobson-jobson "baboo" is degrading as it "attempts to reduce educated Indians (especially Bengalis) to mimics and harlequins".

James A. Murray made extensive use of Hobson-Jobson in writing entries on South Asian words for the Oxford English Dictionary.

== Law of Hobson-Jobson ==
The term "law of Hobson-Jobson" is sometimes used in linguistics to refer to the process of phonological change by which loanwords are adapted to the phonology of the new language, as in the archetypal example of "Hobson-Jobson" itself. Webster's Third International Dictionary gives as examples of the law of Hobson-Jobson: Spanish cucaracha becoming English cockroach, and English riding coat becoming French redingote.

== See also ==
- Anglo-Indian cuisine
- Folk etymology
- Hanklyn-Janklin
- List of English words of Sanskrit origin
- List of English words of Hindi origin
- Phono-semantic matching
