= Aindra School of Grammar =

One of 11 schools of Sanskrit grammar

The Aindra(of Indra) school of Sanskrit grammar is allegedly one of the ancient schools of Sanskrit grammar. It is named after Indra as a reference to Lord Indra, the king of deities in Hindu mythology. Arthur Coke Burnell, a renowned orientologist, in his 1875 book, "On the Aindra school of Sanskrit grammars", describes this school. Burnell believed that most non-Pāṇinian systems of Sanskrit grammar were traceable to this school of grammar, believed to be the oldest and reputed to be founded by Indra himself.

== Aindra, Katantra schools and the Tolkappiyam ==
Burnell's search for the Aindra school took him to Southern India where he came across the Tamil grammatical work Tolkappiyam. A preface of this work, written during the twelfth century CE by Ilampuranar describes the work as aindiram nirainda Tolkappiyam^{[incorrect quote]}('comprising Aindra'). Burnell posits that this is an allusion to the pre-Pāṇinian Aindra school of grammar.

While his demonstration of the influence of Sanskrit on the Tolkappiyam has met with some approval, his attribution and approximation of all non Pāṇinian schools of Sanskrit grammar with the Aindra school has met with resistance. Some scholars have also taken a less committal line on the question of Sanskrit influence itself.

== See also ==
- Schools of Sanskrit grammar
- Pāṇini
- Tolkappiyam
- Vyakarana
- Sanskrit grammar
- Katantra
