= List of English words of Dravidian origin =

Distribution of Dravidian languages

Dravidian languages are a language family spoken primarily in South India, and in certain other pockets in South Asia. The most commonly spoken Dravidian languages are Telugu, Tamil, Kannada, and Malayalam.

This is a non-exhaustive list of English words that are borrowed directly or ultimately from Dravidian languages. While the origin of some of the words can be traced to specific languages, others have disputed or uncertain origins, which are listed separately.

== Probable Dravidian origin or origin from multiple Dravidian languages ==
- Aiyo, a word used to express distress, regret and fear; from Tamil aiyo (ஐயோ), or non-Dravidian Sinhalese ayiyo (අයියෝ).
- Anaconda, large boa from South America; probably from Sinhalese henakandaya meaning "slender green snake" or Tamil anaikkondan (ஆனைகொண்டான்) meaning "elephant-killer".
- Bamboo, type of tropical grass; from Malayo-Polynesian samambu via Dutch bamboe and/or Portuguese bambu, probably borrowed from Kannada bambu (ಬಂಬು).
- Betel, a leaf of a vine belonging to the family Piperaceae; from Portuguese betel, which probably comes from Malayalam vettila (വെറ്റില) or Tamil vettrilai (வெற்றிலை) meaning "bare leaf".
- Candy, crystallized sugar or confection made from sugar; via Persian qand from Sanskrit khanda, probably from Tamil kantu meaning "candy" (கண்டு) or kattu (கட்டு) meaning "to harden".
- Cash, physical money; possibly from Middle French caisse or Portuguese caixa, though probably influencing Tamil kasu (காசு) meaning "coin".
- Catechu, extract of Acacia trees; from Portuguese via New Latin, probably derived from Marathi kaccu, Malay kacu or Malayalam cashoo (കശൂ).
- Coir, cord or rope, fibre from husk of coconut; from Malayalam kayar (കയർ) or Tamil kayiru (கயிறு) meaning "rope".
- Coolie, a hired labourer of South Asian origin; possibly from Tamil cooli (கூலி) meaning "hire", or possibly via Gujarati Koḷī derived from Dravidian languages.
- Copra, dried kernel of coconut; from Portuguese copra , probably derived from Malayalam koppara (കൊപ്ര) or Hindi khopri (खोपड़ी) from Sanskrit kharparah (खर्परः) meaning "skull".
- Cot, a bedstead or a portable bed; via Hindi from Sanskrit khatva (खटवा) meaning "couch", probably derived from Tamil kattil (கட்டில்) meaning "bedstead".
- Cowrie, shells of certain gastropods; via Hindi and Urdu from Sanskrit kaparda (कपर्द), which may be related to Tamil kotu (கோது) meaning "shell".
- Dhole, an Indian wild dog; probably from Dravidian languages such as Kannada tola (ತೋಳ) meaning "wolf".
- Dosa, a savory pancake-like dish made from rice flour and ground pulses; possibly from Sangam Tamil tocai (தோசை), or from Kannada dose (ದೋಸೆ), from Malalayam dosa (ദോശ) or other Dravidian languages.
- Ginger, a rhizome plant; via Latin gingiber from Greek zingiberis, probably derived from Tamil inchi-ver (இஞ்சி-வேர்) meaning "ginger root" or Malayalam inchi (ഇഞ്ചി) meaning "pungent".
- Godown, a warehouse; from Malay, probably derived from Telugu giddangi (గిడ్డంగి) or Tamil kitanku (கிடங்கு) from kita meaning "to lie".
- Gunny, a sack or bag; from Sanskrit via Hindi goni (गोनी), probably ultimately from a Dravidian language such as Kannada goni (ಗೋಣಿ).
- Hot toddy, beverage made of alcoholic liquor with hot water, sugar, and spices; from Hindi tari (तरी) meaning "palm sap", probably from a Dravidian language.
- Idli, a South Indian steamed rice cake; probably from Tamil idli (இட்லி), or Kannada iddalige (ಇದ್ದಲಿಗೆ).
- Jaggery, coarse brown sugar made from palm and sugarcane; from Portuguese jagara, probably derived from Malayalam chakkara (ചക്കര) or Sanskrit sarkara (सर्करा) meaning "sugar".
- Mango, a tropical fruit; from Portuguese manga probably derived from Tamil maangaay (மாங்காய்) or Malayalam maanga (മാങ്ങ).
- Mongoose, a small carnivorous mammal known for killing snakes; from Portuguese probably from Mahrathi mangus (मांगूस) derived from Telugu mangisu (ముంగిస), Kannada mungisi (ಮುಂಗಿಸಿ) or Tamil mangus (மங்குசு).
- Mung, a type of bean; via Hindi mug from Sanskrit mudga (मुद्ग), probably from Tamil mungu (முங்கு) meaning "soak".
- Orange, a citrus fruit, or a color named for the fruit; from Middle French via Portuguese, Italian narans, Arabic naranji, and Persian narang, derived from Sanskrit narang (नरन्ग), probably originating from Tamil naram (நாரம்) or Tulu narengi (ನರೇಂಗಿ).
- Pagoda, a sacred tower; from Portuguese pagode via Persian butkada, probably from Tamil pagavadi (பகாவடி) meaning "house belonging to a deity".
- Poon, trees of genus Calophyllum; from Tamil punnai (புண்ணை) or Malayalam punna (പുന്ന).
- Pariah, a social outcast; partly from Tamil paraiyar (பறையர்) and Malayalam parayan (പറയൻ) meaning "drummer".
- Peacock, a bird of genus Pavo; from Old English pawa via Latin pavo and Greek taos, possibly from Tamil thokei (தோகை) meaning "peacock feather".
- Sambal, a spicy condiment; from Malay, borrowed from Tamil campal (சம்பல்) meaning "condiment" or cambaram (சம்பாரம்) meaning "ingredients for curry" or Telugu sambharam (సంబల్) meaning "spicy preparation".
- Teak, a tropical hardwood tree; from Portuguese teca, probably from Tamil thekku (தேக்கு), Malayalam thekku (തേക്ക്), Telugu teku (టేకు), or Kannada tegu (ತೇಗು).

== Malayalam ==
- Areca, Asian betel palm; from New Latin via French or Portuguese, derived from Malayalam ataykka (അടയ്ക്ക).
- Jackfruit, a tropical tree; from Portuguese jaca, derived from Malayalam chakka (ചക്ക).

== Tamil ==
In 2011, Gregory James from the Language Centre of the Hong Kong University of Science and Technology stated that 107 words in the 2011 edition of the Oxford English Dictionary were of Tamil origin, and there are additional words of Tamil origin that have not appeared in the dictionary.

- Alvars, a group of Tamil poet-saints; from Tamil alvar (ஆழ்வார்) meaning "to be absorbed" (as in meditation or contemplation).
- Anicut, a check dam; from Tamil anaikkattu (அணைக்கட்டு) meaning "dam structure".
- Catamaran, a watercraft with two hulls; from Tamil kattumaram (கட்டுமரம்) meaning "tied wood".
- Cheroot, a type of cigar; from Tamil curuttu (சுருட்டு) meaning "roll (of tobacco)".
- Congee, porridge made from rice; from Tamil kanci (கஞ்சி) meaning "boiled rice water".
- Corundum, crystalline form of aluminium oxide; from Tamil kuruntham (குருந்தம்) for "ruby".
- Curry, a spicy Indian dish; from Tamil kari (கறி) meaning "relish".
- Mulligatawny, a type of soup; from Tamil milaku-tannir (மிளகுத்தண்ணீர்) meaning "pepper water".
- Patchouli, a flowering plant; from Tamil pachchai ilai (பச்சை இலை) meaning "green leaf".
- Pandal, a temporary shed; from Tamil pandal (பந்தல்) meaning "temporary shelter".
- Vetiver, a type of grass; from Tamil vetiver (வெட்டிவேர்) meaning "cut root".

== Telugu ==
- Bandicoot, a large Indian rat; from Telugu Pandi-kokku (పందికొక్కు) meaning "pig-rat".
- Pitta, colourful bird from the Passerine family; from Telugu pitta (పిట్ట) meaning "young bird".

== See also ==
- Indian English
- List of English words of Indian origin
