= Karsa River =

River in Ethiopia

Coordinates: 7°33′N 38°49′E

Karsa River (Oromiffa qarsaa, "flat rock, whetting stone") is a river within western Ethiopia. A tributary of the Kobara, the river has been panned for gold in the past by the local inhabitants.
