= Theodor Goldstücker =

German Sanskrit scholar

Theodor Goldstücker (also Theodore; January 18, 1821 – March 6, 1872) was a German Sanskrit scholar.

== Biography ==
He was born of Jewish parents in Königsberg, Prussia. After attending the gymnasium of that town, he entered its university in 1836 as a student of Sanskrit.

In 1838 he removed to Bonn, and, after graduating at Königsberg in 1840, proceeded to Paris; in 1842 he edited a German translation of the Prabodhacandrodaya by Kṛṣṇamiśra Yati (fl. c. 1050–1100), a standard text widely read by Sanskrit students in India. From 1847 to 1850 he resided at Berlin, where his talents and scholarship were recognized by Alexander von Humboldt, but where his political views caused the authorities to regard him with suspicion. He was asked to leave Berlin during the revolutions of 1848 in the German states. In 1850 he moved to London at the invitation of H. H. Wilson. In 1852 he was appointed professor of Sanskrit in University College London. He worked on a new edition of Wilson's Sanskrit dictionary, of which the first instalment appeared in 1856. But his work became infeasibly long and detailed, and publication of the dictionary ground to a halt. In 1861 he published his best known work Panini: his place in Sanscrit Literature. He was the founder of the Sanskrit Text Society (four volumes appeared); he was also an active member of the Philological Society, of which he was president at the time of his death; and of other learned bodies. He died in London.

== Works ==
As Literary Remains some of his writings were published in two volumes (London, 1879), but his papers were left to the India Office with the request that they were not to be published until 1920.
