= Teapoy =

Type of table

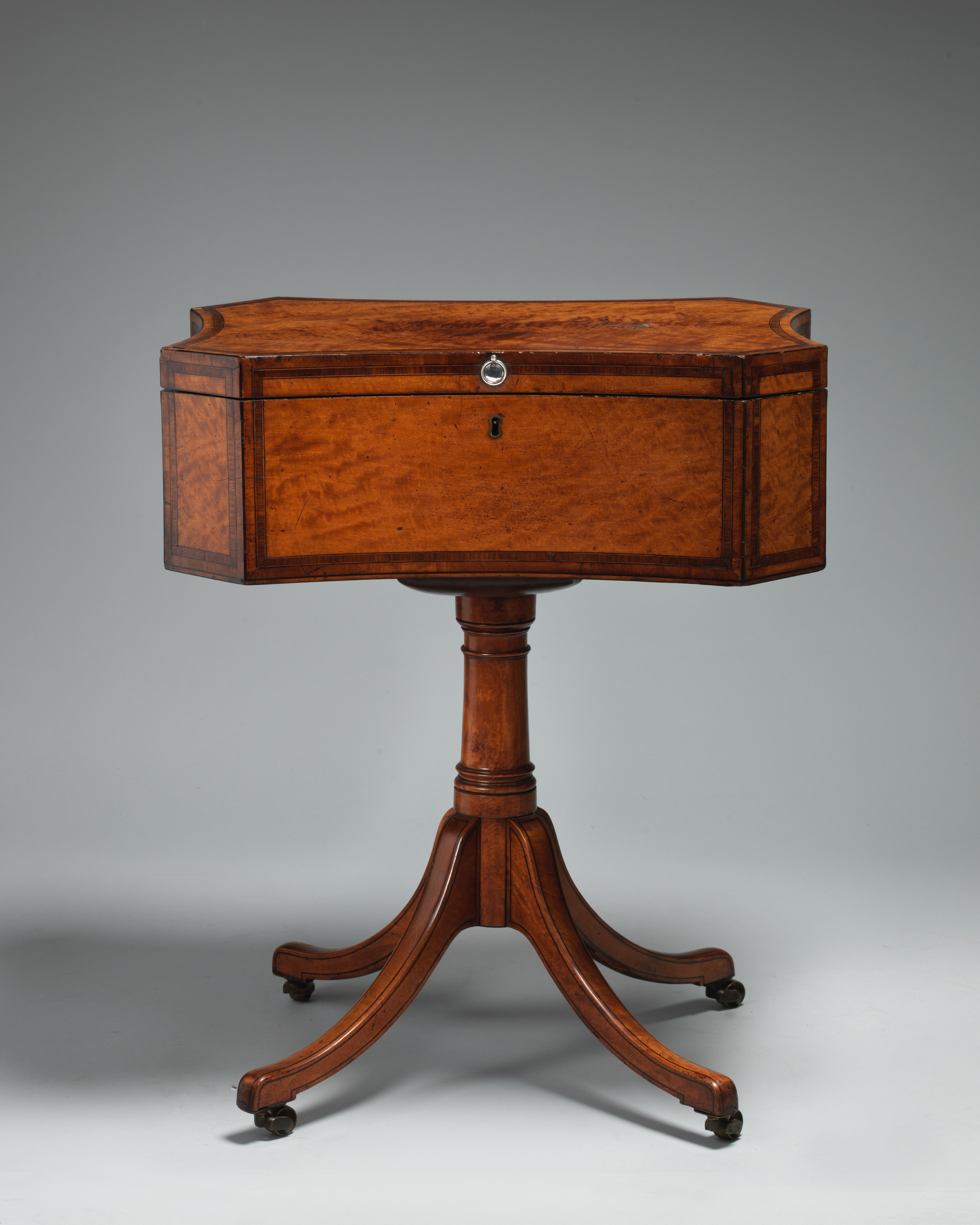
An antique four-legged British teapoy in the Metropolitan Museum of Art

A teapoy is an item of furniture. The word is of Indian origin, and was originally used to describe a three-legged table, literally meaning "three feet" in Hindi.

By erroneous association with the word "tea" in the middle of the 19th century, it is also used to describe a table with a container for tea, or a table for holding a tea service. In the 19th century, the word was also sometimes applied to a large porcelain or earthenware tea caddy, and more frequently to the small bottles, often of enamel, which fitted into receptacles in the caddy and actually contained the tea.

Teapoys were small three-legged tables with a tabletop turning into a shallow box by 1820s that turned into a tea chest by the middle of the 19th century, at the same time woods (rosewood, mahogany, walnut) were supplemented by the papier-mâché, resulting in highly decorative designs with inlays of ivory and mother-of-pearl.

== See also ==
- Charpoy, a bed with four legs
- Coffee table

== Sources ==
- Gloag, John; Edwards, Clive (1991). "Teapoy". A Complete Dictionary of Furniture. Overlook Press. pp. 664–666. ISBN 978-0-87951-414-3. OCLC 1063834296.
