= Ioan-Iovitz Popescu =

Romanian physicist and linguist (1932–2023)

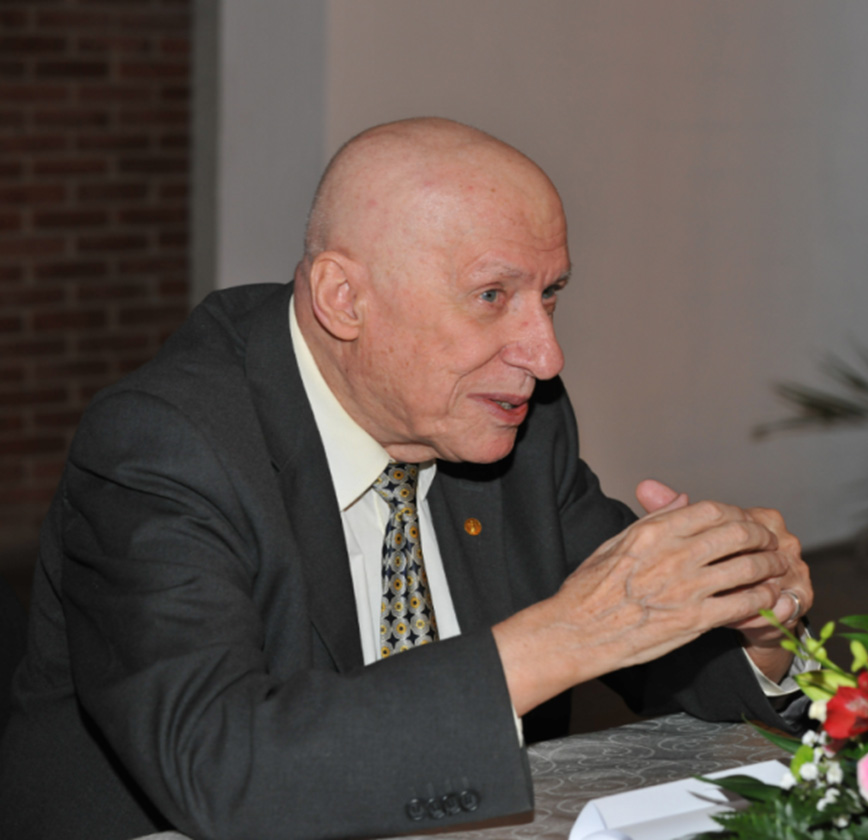
- Iovitzu Popescu
- Born: October 1, 1932; Burila Mare, Kingdom of Romania
- Died: December 22, 2023 (aged 91)
- Education: University of Bucharest (doctoral); University of Kiel (post-doctoral)
- Known for: Electric discharge in gases Plasma physics Laser spectroscopy Gamma-ray lasers Quantitative linguistics
- Spouse: Denisa-Georgeta Popescu (m. 1963; died 2003)
- Awards: Commander of the National Order of Faithful Service (2000)
- Scientific career
- Fields: Physics, Applied Physics, Linguistics
- Workplaces: University of Bucharest, Faculty of Physics; Romanian Academy
- Doctoral advisor: Eugen Bădărău
- Other academic advisors: Walter Lochte-Holtgreven and Johannes Richter (post-doctoral)
- Website: iipopescu.com

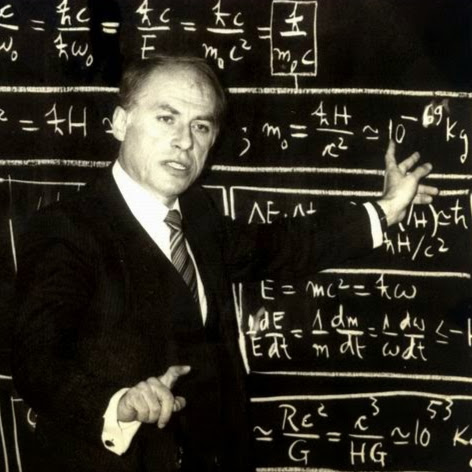
Ioan-Iovitz Popescu giving a lecture, University of Bucharest, 1982

Ioan-Iovitz "Iovitzu" Popescu (October 1, 1932 – 22 December, 2023) was a Romanian physicist and linguist, emeritus professor at University of Bucharest, Faculty of Physics, and member of the Romanian Academy. In the field of physics, he is best known for his work on gas discharges and plasma physics, as well as his collaborations with Denisa Popescu in laser spectroscopy. He also had pioneering contributions in the field of gamma-ray lasers with Carl B. Collins and Silviu Olariu.

As of 2006, the focus of Iovitzu Popescu's work had shifted towards the field of linguistics, in cooperation with leading linguist Gabriel Altmann.

== Early life ==
Iovitzu Popescu was born in Burila Mare village, Mehedinți County. He is the son of Dumitru Popescu and Elvira (née Iovitz). In 1951 he graduated from Traian High School in Turnu Severin. Between 1951 and 1955 he was a student at the University of Bucharest, Faculty of Mathematics and Physics, from which he graduated in 1955 with the thesis "Sodium-Vapor Lamp", supervised by Radu Grigorovici.

== Career ==
In 1955, following graduation, Iovitzu Popescu was offered a position at the University of Bucharest by Eugen Bădărău, in the Department of Optics and Gas Discharges, which he accepted. In 1961, he obtained his Ph.D. on a thesis entitled "The mechanism of cathodic parts of glow discharges", under Bădărău's supervision.

Between 1960 and 1972 Iovitzu Popescu was head of the Plasma Physics Laboratory at the Institute of Physics, Bucharest. In 1969, he co-authored one of the first experimental studies on nano-clustering in high pressure gases. From 1967 to 1969 he was a Humboldt fellow at University of Kiel, Germany. He worked on atomic spectroscopy with Walter Lochte-Holtgreven and Johannes Richter. In 1970, he started his collaboration with Carl B. Collins, head of the Center for Quantum Electronics at University of Texas at Dallas, on multiphoton spectroscopy and induced gamma emission. In 1974, they co-authored the first experimental report on multiphoton spectra. In 1972, Popescu became a tenured professor at University of Bucharest, Faculty of Physics. He was the Dean of the Faculty of Physics from 1972 to 1977. Between 1977 and 1981 he headed the newly founded Institute of Physics and Technology of Radiation Devices.

In May 1981, Popescu became Rector of the University of Bucharest, a position he held until October 1989. In 1990 he was elected a titular member of the Romanian Academy, having been a corresponding member for 16 years. He presided over the Physical Sciences Section of the Romanian Academy between 1990 and 1992.

In 1982, Iovitzu Popescu wrote that the aether is "a form of existence of the matter, but it differs qualitatively from the common (atomic and molecular) substance or radiation (photons)". The fluid aether is "governed by the principle of inertia and its presence produces a modification of the space-time geometry". Built upon Le Sage's ultra-mundane corpuscles, Popescu's theory posits a finite Universe "filled with some particles of exceedingly small mass (of about 10^{−69} kg), traveling chaotically at speed of light" and material bodies "made up of such particles called etherons".

In recent years, the interest of Iovitzu Popescu has shifted to the field of quantitative linguistics, which has become one of his favorite leisure activities. His main collaborator in this field was Gabriel Altmann from Ruhr University Bochum.

The career achievements of Popescu have been recognized and celebrated by various personalities and organizations.

== Personal life ==
Iovitzu Popescu was married to Denisa-Georgeta Popescu from 1963 until her death in 2003. Together they co-authored 35 papers on optogalvanic and laser spectroscopy. The author biography of Iovitzu Popescu was published in 2020, titled "Iovițu's life". He died on 22 December 2023 at the age of 91.

== Awards ==
The excellence of Iovitzu Popescu's work has been widely recognized:

- 1961 - Physics Prize, awarded by the Ministry of National Education.
- 1966 - "Constantin Miculescu" prize for Physics awarded by the Romanian Academy.
- 1997 - Honorary Citizen of Mehedinți County.
- 1998 - Doctor Honoris Causa of the University of Craiova.
- 2000 - Commander of the Order of Faithful Service awarded by the President of Romania.
- 2002 - "Meritul Academic" diploma awarded by the Romanian Academy.
- 2002 - "Diploma of Excellence" awarded by the Ministry of Education and Research.
- 2009 - "Opera Omnia" prize for lifetime achievements in science awarded by CNCSIS.
- 2009 - "Diploma of Excellence" of Drobeta-Turnu Severin City.
- 2010 - "Medal of Honor" awarded by the Institute of Atomic Physics.
- 2012 - "Grigore Moisil" award for exact sciences awarded by the National Grand Lodge of Romania.
- 2012 - "Diploma of Excellence" awarded by the Ministry of Education and Research.

== Bibliography ==
To date, the most cited peer-reviewed publication of Iovitzu Popescu remains his collaborative review, with Silviu Olariu, on the quantum effects of electromagnetic fluxes, recently quoted in the review paper Topological Metamaterials (2022).

Popescu's handwritten textbook on geometrical optics, first published in 1988, was recently translated into English and is freely available online.

His most notable books and scientific publications are:

- The quantum effects of electromagnetic fluxes
- Word frequency studies
- Accelerated emission of gamma rays from the 31-yr isomer of 178 Hf induced by X-Ray irradiation
- The coherent and incoherent pumping of a gamma ray laser with intense optical radiation
- Use of space-charge-amplification techniques in the absorption spectroscopy of Cs and Cs 2
- Multiphoton excitation and ionization of atomic cesium with a tunable dye laser
- Multiphoton ionization of cesium through resonant dissociative states of Cs2
- Aspects of word frequencies

== See also ==
- Luminiferous aether
- Aether theories
