= Radu Grigorovici =

Romanian physicist

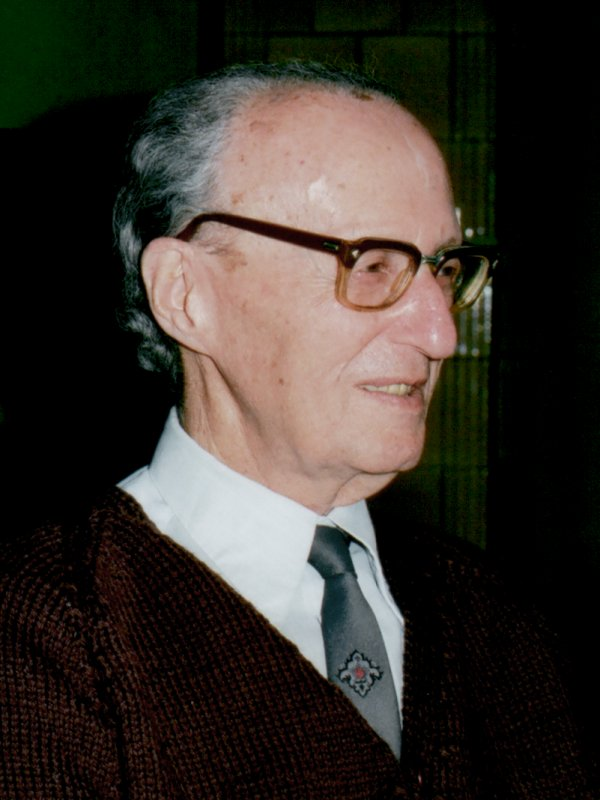
- Born: 20 November 1911; Czernowitz, Austria-Hungary
- Died: August 2, 2008 (aged 96); Bucharest, Romania
- Resting place: Bellu Cemetery, Bucharest
- Education: University of Cernăuți; University of Bucharest
- Partner: Elena (née Răzvan)
- Children: Rodica Marchidan
- Parents: Gheorghe Grigorovici (father); Tatiana Grigorovici (mother)
- Awards: Order of the Star of Romania, Grand Officer class
- Scientific career
- Fields: Physics
- Workplaces: University of Bucharest
- Thesis: Disruptive potential of mercury vapor (1938)
- Academic advisors: Eugen Bădărău
- Notable students: Ioan-Iovitz Popescu

Radu Grigorovici (November 20, 1911 – August 2, 2008) was a Romanian physicist specializing in condensed matter physics, solid-state physics, and amorphous semiconductors.

== Biography ==
He was born on November 20, 1911 in Czernowitz, the only son of the Bucovina Social Democrats Gheorghe and Tatiana Grigorovici. After graduating from the city's Aron Pumnul High School in 1928, he studied at the University of Cernăuți, receiving a degree in chemistry in 1931 and a degree in physics in 1934. He was then a trainee at the same university, in the Experimental Physics laboratory of Eugen Bădărău.

In 1936, he transferred to the Faculty of Sciences of the University of Bucharest, where Bădărău had been called as head of the Laboratory of Molecular, Acoustic and Optical Physics. In 1938, he obtained a PhD in physical sciences with a dissertation on the disruptive potential of mercury vapor. He climbed the ranks of the university hierarchy, becoming an associate professor in 1949. Between 1947 and 1957, he worked in parallel in the light source industry (Lumen factory, then Electrofar), as a consulting engineer. For political reasons, he was forced to give up his university career. He retired from research, becoming head of department (1960) and deputy scientific director (1963) at the Bucharest Institute of Physics of the RPR Academy; in 1970 the institute will be subordinated to the State Committee for Nuclear Energy. In 1973 he applied for retirement, continuing his activity as a leading part-time scientific researcher; in 1977, following a reorganization, he was transferred to the Institute of Physics and Materials Technology, and after a year his employment contract was terminated.

Radu Grigorovici made original contributions to the physics of electric gas discharges, flame spectral analysis, light sources, physiological and instrumental optics, size systems and physical-physiological units. At the Bucharest Institute of Physics, he organized and led a group of researchers who studied the phenomena of transport in disordered thin metal layers, explained by the band structure of the respective metals (1959–1966). But the most important results (some in collaboration with Jan Tauc or Rodica Mănăilă) were obtained in the study of amorphous semiconductors (1964–1977).

Grigorovici and collaborators studied the structure, electrical transport, optical properties and photoconductivity in amorphous layers of germanium, silicon and carbon obtained by vacuum evaporation. Based on these results, he was the first to highlight the structural differences between amorphous and microcrystalline layers of germanium and silicon; followed by the elaboration of a structural model, completed with energy considerations. This "amorphonic model", later refined in various laboratories as a "random network model", is today practically unanimously accepted as a structural model for amorphous semiconductors and has opened new avenues in research and applications.

These works brought international fame to the Grigorovici group, and to its initiator the recognition as a founding mentor of a Romanian research school in this field. The results were disseminated at international conferences and summer schools, in synthesis articles and monographs, were quoted extensively and had the appreciation of physicists of Nevill Francis Mott level. Grigorovici served on the organizing committees of numerous international congresses, in the editorial boards of specialized journals (Journal of Non-Crystalline Solids, Thin Solid Films, Physica Status Solidi), and in the Semiconductor Commission of the International Union of Pure Physics and Applied (1969–1975).

Elected corresponding member of the Romanian Academy in 1963, he became full member of the Academy in 1990, and served as its vice-president from 1990 to 1994. Concerned with the "truth of life and the truth of science", he actively engaged in the regeneration of the academy in the years following the communist dictatorship. He was an honorary member of the Academy of Sciences of Moldova and an honorary doctor of the University of Bucharest. In 2000, he was awarded the Order of the Star of Romania, Grand Officer class.

Known for his nonconformism and critical spirit, Radu Grigorovici has attracted, throughout his life, the admiration or antipathy of many. An American colleague called him "a world-renowned scientist, a humanist and a musician." He had a permanent and intense interest in literature, history and the arts. After the dismemberment of the Soviet empire, he initiated a sustained dialogue with the Romanians of Bukovina; published, in bilingual Romanian/German edition, a volume of studies and documents about Bucovina. He was a fine musician who, after time devoted to physics, relaxed by playing his favorite pieces from the great repertoire on the piano.

He died on August 1, 2008, in Bucharest, and was buried in the city's Bellu Cemetery.

== Selected publications ==
- Grigorovici, Radu (September 1939). "Die Zündspannung von reinem Quecksilberdampf". Zeitschrift für Physik (in German). 111 (9–10): 596–616. doi:10.1007/BF01330007.
- Tauc, Jan; Grigorovici, R.; Vancu, Ana (January 1966). "Optical Properties and Electronic Structure of Amorphous Germanium". Physica Status Solidi B. 15 (2): 627–637. doi:10.1002/pssb.19660150224.
- Grigorovici, Radu; Mănăilă, Rodica (August 1969). "Short-range order in amorphous germanium". Journal of Non-Crystalline Solids. 1 (5): 371–387. doi:10.1016/0022-3093(69)90020-9.
- Bârsan, Nicolae; Grigorovici, Radu; Ionescu, Radu; Motronea, Manuela; Vancu, Ana (April 1989). "Mechanism of gas detection in polycrystalline thick film SnO2 sensors". Thin Solid Films. 171 (1): 53–63. doi:10.1016/0040-6090(89)90033-3.
