= Second City =

A second city is the second-most important city in the urban hierarchy of a country or region, often in contrast to a primate city. In particular, it may refer to:

- The second city of the United Kingdom
- Chicago, nicknamed the Second City

Second City or The Second City may also refer to:

- The Second City, an improvisational comedy troupe initially based in Chicago
- Second City Television, a Canadian television sketch comedy show that aired intermittently between 1976 and 1984
- Mercenary: The Second City, a 1986 expansion pack for the video game Mercenary
- "Second City", an episode of 2007 Canadian/American TV series The Dresden Files
- Second City derby, an association football rivalry between Aston Villa and Birmingham City
- Secondcity, stage name of American-born British musician Rowan Harrington (born 1987)

== See also ==
- Secondary city
