= Primate of Serbia =

Primate of Serbia may refer to:

- Primate of Serbia (Roman Catholic), historical and honorary title of Roman Catholic archbishops of Bar, in modern Montenegro
- colloquial term for the heads (historically: archbishops, metropolitans or patriarchs) of the Serbian Orthodox Church, in Serbia

== See also ==
- Primate (disambiguation)
- Serbia (disambiguation)
