= Priamel =

Literary device

A priamel (/priˈæməl/) is a literary and rhetorical device consisting of a series of listed alternatives that serve as foils to the true subject of the poem, which is revealed in a climax. For example, Fragment 16 by the Greek poet Sappho (translated by Mary Barnard) begins with a priamel:

Οἰ μὲν ἰππήων στρότον οἰ δὲ πέσδων
οἰ δὲ νάων φαῖσ᾽ ἐπὶ γᾶν μέλαιναν
ἔμμεναι κάλλιστον• ἔγω δὲ κῆν᾽

ὄττω τὶς ἔραται.

Some say a cavalry corps,
some infantry, some, again,
will maintain that the swift oars
of our fleet are the finest
sight on dark earth; but I say
that whatever one loves, is.

Other examples are found in Pindar's First Olympian, Horace, Villon, Shakespeare, and Baudelaire, as well as in the Bible, both Old Testament and New Testament:

Some trust in chariots, and some in horses; but we will remember the name of the Lord our God. (AV) (Psalms 20:7)

And Jesus said unto him, Foxes have holes, and birds of the air have nests; but the Son of man hath not where to lay his head. (AV) (Luke 9:58)

William H. Race, in his book on the subject, writes:

As for the term itself, "priamel" was unknown to ancient writers. There is no word in Greek or Latin which describes it, and no discussion in the voluminous writings on rhetoric which indicates any theoretical knowledge of it. It is, in short, an invention of the twentieth century and applied anachronistically to classical poetry and prose.

The German term Priamel (from Latin praeambulum) was introduced to classical studies by the German philologist Franz Dornseiff in his Pindars Stil (1921); it originally referred to "a minor poetic genre composed primarily in Germany from the 12th to the 16th centuries. Such Priameln are, on the whole, short poems consisting of a series of seemingly unrelated, often paradoxical statements which are cleverly brought together at the end, usually in the final verse." Compare the anonymous Priamel "Ich leb und weiss nit, wie lang ..." that was attributed to Martinus von Biberach.

While the name "priamel" is modern, the form itself may be ancient. Martin L. West's Indo-European Poetry and Myth collects examples from a wide ranging set of rhetorical figures in Indo-European languages, from Sanskrit to Old Irish, as well as Latin and Greek. West relates the priamel to the "augmented triads" found in other ancient Indo-European literatures, a form in which three items are listed, and the third item on the list is described by an adjective to give it extra weight:

ἢ Αἴας ἢ Ἰδομενεὺς ἢ δῖος Ὀδυσσεὺς

Whether Ajax, or Idomeneus, or godlike Odysseus

West also relates the priamel to Behaghel's law of increasing terms, which states that the longest and most important of a series of listed phrases tends to appear at the end.

== See also ==
- Welsh Triads
- Behaghel's laws
