= Burila =

Burila may refer to one of two places in Mehedinți County, Romania:

- Burila Mare, a commune
- Burila Mică, a village in Gogoșu, Mehedinți
