= NURC =

NURC may refer to:

- National Ultimate Running Championship, Norway
- NATO Undersea Research Centre, Italy
- National Undersea Research Center, USA
- National Underwater Robotics Challenge, USA
- National Unity and Reconciliation Commission, Rwanda
- National University Research Council, Romania
