= Editura Militară =

Romanian publishing house

Editura Militară (Military Publishing House) is a publishing house based in Bucharest, Romania. It was founded as a state-run company during the communist period on 27 December 1950. The Military Publishing House is a registered trademark of the Ministry of National Defense and it is recognized by the National Council for Scientific Research in Higher Education (CNCSIS 010 code).

Founded in 1950, the Military Publishing House began its activities by publishing works in the field of political doctrine, military art and science, history and memoirs, all necessary for military personnel training – for the needed alignment with the existing trends in military training and education, in defense strategies and technology – and for nurturing the patriotic spirit.

Throughout its existence, the Military Publishing House faced the hard times which have marked the history of postwar Romania, trying to cope with the hardship of a highly authoritarian system. Therefore, on more than one occasion, it had no choice but to publish works expressing the ideology of the time. Often enough the Military Publishing House succeeded in breaking the barriers imposed by the political factor: by thematic diversification; by publishing prestigious authors and being true to the scientific truth; by promoting various literary works in which the underlying aesthetic principle was pre-eminent. In a censorship-ruled world, the Military Publishing House gained a good reputation in the cultural field, and succeeded in publishing works which many other publishers couldn't.

The collections published by the Military Publishing House, as well as the stand-alone works, have embraced various thematic areas, from strategy, operational art and tactics, to history, war memories, military technology or medical work specific to the armed confrontations, international humanitarian law, fiction – historical novel, adventure novel, poetry, etc. The public greatly appreciated some of the publishing house's series and collections, such as "Pages of military history of the Romanian people", "Memories of war", "The small library of military science" and "The small tactical library", "Sphinx" and others. At the end of the 1980s, the Military Publishing House succeeded in publishing over one hundred titles every year, many of which were original works and original scientific studies. It also published translations – not only military or historical literature but also fiction –, highly appreciated by the readers and recognized as what they really were: the only way to remain informed and enjoy a pleasant time while gaining a good level of general culture or a highly specific one.

After the revolution of December 1989, the Military Publishing House aligned its efforts of modernization and reform to those of the whole Romanian Army, necessary for the country's goal of becoming a member of the North-Atlantic Treaty Organization and of the European Union. As a result, the Military Publishing House adapted its programs and projects to the formative and informative requirements of this period of great change.

During this time, The Military Publishing House published works of some important cultural and scientific personalities from Romania, such as Constantin C. Giurescu, Dinu C. Giurescu, Hadrian Daicoviciu, Dan Berindei, Florin Constantiniu, Radu Florescu, Andrei Pippidi, Mihai Retegan, Nicolae Stoicescu, Gheorghe Niculescu, Iuliu Șuteu, Mircea Olteanu, Ioan Nedelcu, Constantin Antip, Valentin Arsenie, Gheorghe Marin, and Ion Șuța, and writers such as Nichita Stănescu, Marin Preda, Marin Sorescu, Petre Sălcudeanu, Mircea Horia Simionescu, Grigore Hagiu, Mircea Nedelciu, Costache Olăreanu, Traian T. Coșovei, and others. Many of the works published here have acquired a well-earned recognition nationally, some being rewarded with prizes of the Romanian Academy.

Many military experts in various fields have published here works which were worthy contributions to the development of military art and science or Romanian military technology, with a major role for their future career: many reached high positions in the military hierarchy or in the military education system.

The translations published by the Military Publishing House enriched the Romanian culture – both military and general – with works by worldwide recognized authors, such as Sun Tzu, Carl von Clausewitz, B. H. Liddell Hart, Gaston Bouthoul, André Fontaine, Jean-Pierre Cathala, Michel Droit, Julian Amery, and Carl Gustaf Emil Mannerheim.

The Military Publishing House now follows the path of redefining itself and achieving a higher versatility in shaping its editorial projects, in close consonance with the information needs of the military personnel and of the general public, with regard to the contemporary military phenomenon – thus becoming an authentic image vector for the military institution, for meeting the technical and conceptual challenges of this new millennium.
