= Synergetic linguistics =

Study of language as a complex, dynamic system

Synergetic linguistics is an interdisciplinary field within linguistics that applies principles from synergetics to language studies. It proposes integrating as many language laws as possible into a unified system and empirically testing their interactions. This approach aligns with the central aims of the newer Quantitative linguistics, largely influenced by Gabriel Altmann and extensively developed by Reinhard Köhler.

This approach is useful for exploring phenomena such as language evolution, language acquisition, and sociolinguistics.

== Applications ==
The approach has been influential in understanding the historical development of languages, providing insights into how language changes over time due to internal dynamics and external influences. Additionally, it is applied in the study of psycholinguistics, where it helps explain how individuals acquire and use language in a dynamic social context.

== Principles ==
The fundamental model, known as "Köhler's loop," encompasses several insights:

- More frequently used words tend to be shorter.
- Shorter words often carry multiple meanings.
- Words with multiple meanings appear in a wide variety of texts.
- Words that appear more frequently across texts tend to have higher overall frequency.

These principles were formally posited in the works of scholars such as Ludwig Luzzatto, who noted in 1836 the tendency towards brevity influenced by the frequency of word usage in everyday speech, a concept also reflected in Köhler's quantitative research.

== Applications ==
Synergetic linguistics has been applied beyond language to include analyses of historical lexicons and morphological models across languages, demonstrating the model's broader implications and adaptability to various linguistic subsystems.

== See also ==
- Language model
- Complex system
- Quantitative text analysis
- Zipf's law
- Brevity law
