= Mark Jefferson =

Mark Jefferson may refer to:

- Mark Jefferson (geographer) (1863–1949), American geographer and cartographer
- Mark Jefferson (cricketer) (born 1976), New Zealand cricketer
