= Menzerath's law =

Linguistic law

Menzerath's law, also known as the Menzerath–Altmann law (named after Paul Menzerath and Gabriel Altmann), is a linguistic law according to which the increase of the size of a linguistic construct results in a decrease of the size of its constituents, and vice versa.

For example, the longer a sentence (measured in terms of the number of clauses), the shorter the clauses (measured in terms of the number of words), or: the longer a word (in syllables or morphs), the shorter the syllables or morphs in sounds.

== History ==
In the 19th century, Eduard Sievers observed that vowels in short words are pronounced longer than the same vowels in long words. Menzerath & de Oleza (1928) expanded this observation to state that, as the number of syllables in words increases, the syllables themselves become shorter on average.

From this, the following hypothesis developed:

The larger the whole, the smaller its parts.

In particular, for linguistics:

The larger a linguistic construct, the smaller its constituents.

In the early 1980s, Altmann, Heups, and Köhler demonstrated using quantitative methods that this postulate can also be applied to larger constructs of natural language: the larger the sentence, the smaller the individual clauses, etc. A prerequisite for such relationships is that a relationship between units (here: sentence) and their direct constituents (here: clause) is examined.

== Mathematics ==
According to Altmann (1980), it can be mathematically stated as:

$$y=a \cdot x^{b} \cdot e^{-c x}$$

where:

- $y$ is the constituent size (e.g. syllable length);
- $x$ is the size of the linguistic construct that is being inspected (e.g. number of syllables per word);
- $a$, $b$, $c$ are positive parameters.

The law can be explained by assuming that linguistic segments contain information about their structure (besides the information that needs to be communicated). The assumption that the length of the structure information is independent of the length of the other content of the segment yields the alternative formula that was also successfully empirically tested.

== Examples ==
=== Linguistics ===
Gerlach (1982) checked a German dictionary with about 15,000 entries:

$x$	$n$	$y$	$y^*$
1	2391	4.53	4.33
2	6343	3.25	3.37
3	4989	2.93	2.91
4	1159	2.78	2.62
5	112	2.65	2.42
6	13	2.58	2.26

Where $x$ is the number of morphs per word, $n$ is the number of words in the dictionary with length $x$; $y$ is the observed average length of morphs (number of phonemes per morph); $y^*$ is the prediction according to $y = ax^{b}$ where $a, b$ are fitted to data. The F-test has $p < 0.001$.

As another example, the simplest form of Menzerath's law, $y=ax^{b}$, holds for the duration of vowels in Hungarian words:

Word length (syllables per word)	Sound duration (sec/100) using the vowel ā as an example: observed	Sound duration (sec/100) using the vowel ā as an example: predicted
1	27.2	27.64
2	24.2	23.18
3	20.9	20.91
4	19.0	19.43
5	18.2	18.36

More examples are on the German Wikipedia pages on phoneme duration, syllable duration, word length, clause length, and sentence length.

This law also seems to hold true for at least a subclass of Japanese Kanji characters.

=== Non-linguistics ===
Beyond quantitative linguistics, Menzerath's law can be discussed in any multi-level complex systems. Given three levels, $x$ is the number of middle-level units contained in a high-level unit, $y$ is the average number of low-level units contained in middle-level units, Menzerath's law claims a negative correlation between $y$ and $x$.

Menzerath's law is shown to be true for both the base-exon-gene levels in the human genome, and base-chromosome-genome levels in genomes from a collection of species. In addition, Menzerath's law was shown to accurately predict the distribution of protein lengths in terms of amino acid number in the proteome of ten organisms.

Furthermore, studies have shown that the social behavior of baboon groups also corresponds to Menzerath's Law: the larger the entire group, the smaller the subordinate social groups.

In 2016, a research group at the University of Michigan found that the calls of geladas obey Menzerath's law, observing that calls are abbreviated when used in longer sequences.

== See also ==
- Zipf's law
- Brevity law
- Heaps' law
- Bradford's law
- Benford's law
- Pareto distribution
- Principle of least effort
- Rank–size distribution
