= Primat =

Primat may refer to:

- Primat of Saint-Denis (d. c. 1277), French monk and historian
- a standard size of wine bottle

== See also ==
- Primate (disambiguation)
