= Vrancea =

Vrancea may refer to:

- Vrancea County, Romania
- Vrancea Mountains, Romania
- Vrancea, a village in Burila Mare Commune, Mehedinţi County
