= Paul Menzerath =

German linguist

Paul Menzerath (1 January 1883 – 8 April 1954) was a German linguist and experimental phonetician. He discovered that in German, longer words used shorter syllables (based on phonemes) and he suggested that other languages may also follow this principle and was able to confirm it for Spanish. It was later examined by Gabriel Altmann and the rule is called Menzerath's law or the Menzerath-Altmann law.

Menzerath was born in Düren, son of tailor Johann and Elisabeth née Weiler. A Catholic, he was first educated at his home town. He joined Freiburg in 1903 and then changed to Berlin, Marburg, Würzburg, Kiel, Geneva, and Paris. He listened to lectures by Levy, Lommatzsch, Puchstein, Rickert and Steup in Freiburg, Dessau, Dessoir, Diels, Ebeling, Helm, Imelmann, Klebs, Less, etc. Luschan, Menzer, Pariselle, Paulsen, Rawitz, Rothstein, Schmidt, P. Schultz, Wilhelm Schulze, v. Stradonitz, Stumpe, Thomas, Vahlen, Wentzel, v. Wilamowitz Moellendorf, Winnefeld in Berlin, Ach, Biiit, Justi, Kalbfleisch, Natorp, Scharff, Thiele, Thumb in Marburg, Külpe, Schneegans, Weygandt in Würzburg. One of his teachers was Albert Thumb (1865–1915) who was interested in familiarity, fluency and reaction time in experiments. These had applications in truth testing people. His PhD in linguistics and philology was from the University of Würzburg in 1906. He then joined the Institute of Psychology at Uccle, Belgium. In 1914 he was expelled from the lab during World War I and he then served in the military for a year. He then worked as a lecturer of French at Bonn University. In 1916 he returned to Belgium at the University of Ghent and in 1917 he was forced to leave again to the University of Bonn where he remained until the end of World War II. His habilitation in 1920 was on psychology and experimental phonetics and his dissertation was titled Die Aufgabe und Methodik der experimentellen Phonetik (‘Tasks and methodology of experimental phonetics’). Although he had observed the inverse association of word and syllable length in German, it was only in 1928 that he formally examined his prediction of syllable length and word length in Spanish in collaboration with Jesuit researcher J. M. de Oleza. They examined 1432 words that contained 3888 syllables and 8440 sounds. They declared that the shorter the sound, the longer the word in which it is used - they called it the phonic law of quantity. He established a phonetic laboratory in Bonn which was destroyed by aerial bombing during World War II in October 1944.

Menzerath married Marguerite Kingma in 1914. She suffered from illness and her treatment forced Menzerath to mortgage his house. She died in the 1930s. During the Nazi era he was a member of the Deutsche Volkpartei and a supporting member of the SS but he did not play an active role. In 1943 he was accused of having made derogatory remarks on Hitler during a trip to Sweden and for praising Heinrich Heine.
