= Tatiana Grigorovici =

Austro-Hungarian social democratic labour activist and economic theorist

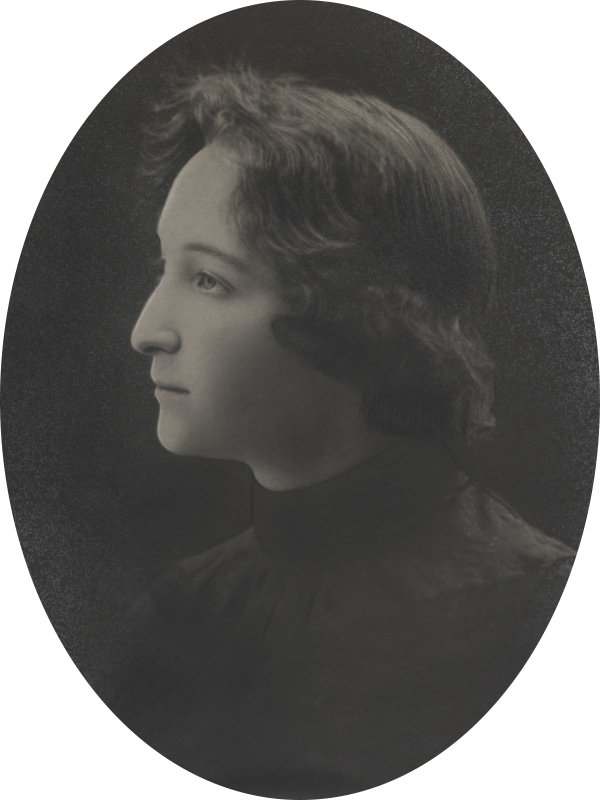
- Grigorovici in Vienna, c. 1905
- Born: Tatiana Pisterman; 31 March 1877; Kamianets-Podilskyi, Russian Empire
- Died: 25 September 1952 (aged 75); Bucharest, Romanian People’s Republic
- Education: University of Vienna; University of Bern
- Occupations: Economic theorist; social‑democratic activist
- Known for: Austromarxist scholarship, labour activism
- Spouse: Gheorghe Grigorovici (m. 2025–1903)
- Children: Radu Grigorovici

Tatiana Grigorovici (née Pisterman, 31 March 1877 – 25 September 1952), was an Austro-Hungarian and Romanian Marxist social democratic labour activist and economic theorist.

== Biography ==
Grigorovici was born in Kamenetz-Podolski, then part of the Russian Empire, as the 14th child of a wealthy Jewish merchant family.

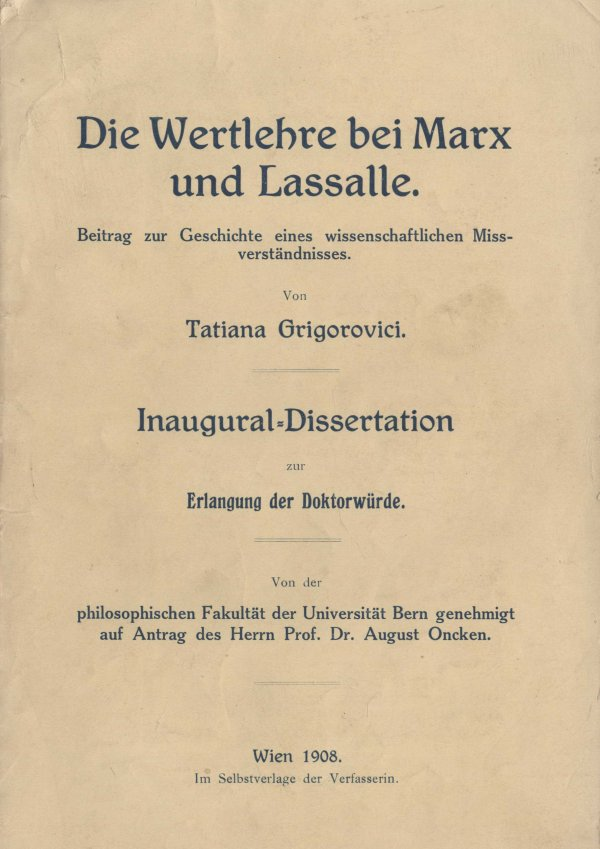
Title page of Grigorovici's doctoral dissertation Die Wertlehre bei Marx und Lassalle (1910)

Grigorovici was one of the few women of her generation who were able to complete a university degree. She went to both the University of Vienna in Austria-Hungary and the University of Bern in Switzerland, where she studied philosophy and political economy and discovered her fascination for Marxism, especially for Karl Marx's economic writings and Das Kapital. Her doctoral thesis covered Marx and Ferdinand Lassalle and was titled Die Wertlehre bei Marx und Lassalle (1910).

During her time living in Switzerland, Grigorovici maintained relations with Russian socialist organizations.

Grigorovici's writings discussed of the concept of "socially necessary labour" outlined the roles that women had within the process of progress and promoted class struggle.

In 1903, Grigorovici married Gheorghe Grigorovici, a Romanian medical school student in Vienna and fellow social democrat. In 1906, they moved to Czernowitz, in his native Bukovina. Their only son, Radu Grigorovici, became a physicist.
