= J. E. Greene =

American materials scientist (1944–2022)

Joe Greene
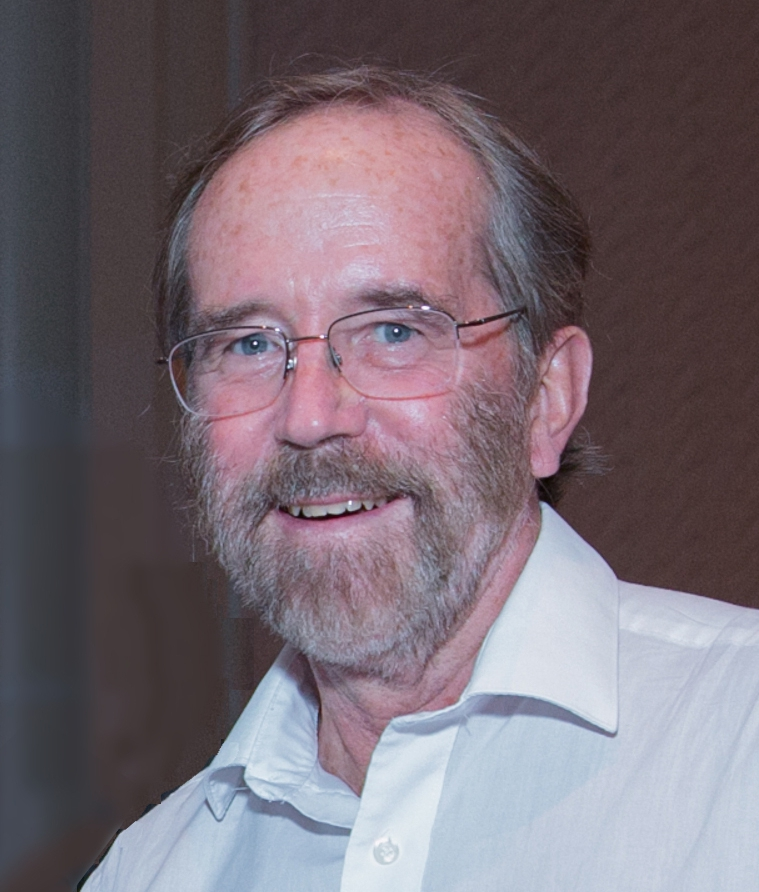
- Greene in 2020
- Born: Joseph Edward Greene; November 25, 1944; Arcata, California, U.S.
- Died: October 10, 2022 (aged 77); Columbus, Ohio, U.S.
- Education: University of Southern California
- Known for: Greene alloys
- Awards: National Academy of Engineering member
- Scientific career
- Fields: Materials science, physics
- Workplaces: University of Illinois at Urbana–Champaign, U.S.; Linköping University, Sweden; National Taiwan University of Science and Technology, Taiwan

Joseph "Joe" Edward Greene, known in his professional writing as J. E. Greene (November 25, 1944 – October 10, 2022) was an American materials scientist, specializing in thin films, crystal growth, surface science, and advanced surface engineering. His research and scientific contributions in these areas have been described as "pioneering" and "seminal" and that his work "revolutionized the hard-coating industry".

Among his many professional organization memberships, Greene was elected President of the American Vacuum Society in 1989 and served as both a Trustee and member of that organization's Board of Directors for multiple terms beginning in 1983.

== Education ==
Greene studied at the University of Southern California, earning a B.S. in Mechanical Engineering in 1967, a M.S. in Electrical Engineering/Materials Science in 1968, and a Ph.D. in Materials Science in 1971. The title of his dissertation was Glow Discharge Spectroscopy for the Analysis of Thin Films. While studying at USC, Greene was a founder and director of Materials Development Corporation from 1969 until 1971.

== Career ==
In 1971, Greene was hired by the University of Illinois at Urbana–Champaign Department of Mechanical Engineering, Metallurgy and Mining as an assistant professor, and was promoted to full professor in 1979. In 1998, he was named as the university's first D. B. Willett College of Engineering Professor, "in recognition of his research and his outstanding teaching reputation". Through 1999, Greene had been named an "outstanding teacher" every semester he taught at the University of Illinois. From 1999 until 2004 he was the director of the Frederick Seitz Materials Research Laboratory and the Center for Microanalysis of Materials. Greene retired as a Professor Emeritus from the UIUC Department of Materials Science and Engineering in 2005.

In 1984, Greene served as a Visiting Professor in the Physics Department at Linköping University in Sweden. This led to years of collaborative and highly productive research with Swedish colleagues that eventually earned Greene the position of Tage Erlander Professor of Materials Physics at Linköping University beginning in 1994.

Greene also held a Chaired Professorship in Materials Science from the National Taiwan University of Science and Technology.

Over the course of his career, Greene supervised over seventy Ph.D. students at the three universities where he held professorships, as well as hosting over 100 visiting scientists and post-doctoral researchers.

=== Editorships ===
- Editor of the journal CRC Critical Reviews in Solid State and Materials Sciences (1985–1998)
- Editor of the journal Thin Solid Films (1991–2022)
- Editorial board member of the journals Brazilian Journal of Vacuum Science and Technology (1988–present) and Physics Procedia (2014–present)
- Associate editor of Journal of Vacuum Science and Technology (1983–1986)

=== Professional organizations ===
Greene was a member of numerous professional organizations, including:

- Member, Electron Spectroscopy Society, where he served as Director from 1976–1981
- Member and Fellow, American Vacuum Society, where he served as President in 1989 and has been on the Board of Directors from 1983–1986, 1988–1991, and 1996 to 2021
- Member, American Institute of Physics, where he was a governing board member from 1993–1995
- Member and Fellow, American Physical Society, where he was a member of the Executive Committee of the Materials Physics Division from 1999–2002
- Member and Fellow, Materials Research Society
- Member, The Minerals, Metals, and Materials Society
- U.S. representative to the International Union of Vacuum Science and Techniques, Thin Film Division from 1986 to 2022

== Research ==
As of 2019, Greene's career spanned more than five decades and during that time his scientific output consisted of "over 625 research and review articles, 29 book chapters, four co-edited books, 525 invited talks, and 140 plenary lectures".

A primary focus of his research was "the development of an atomic-level understanding of adatom/surface interactions during vapor-phase crystal growth".

Greene and his research team conducted the first systematic study of the effects of the ion/metal flux ratio and ion energy on microstructure evolution in hard coatings. Their determinations of the properties of this class of materials are considered reference standards in the field.

He also developed a new class of metastable semiconducting alloys, which became known as the "Greene alloys".

In addition, his work on the development of Si atomic layer epitaxy (ALE), including mapping the basic surface science of Si ALE, are considered seminal contributions in that field and the real-world application of these studies "has since been implemented by electronic companies in the United States and Japan".

His publications have been cited more than 30,000 times by other scholars.

== Awards and honors ==
Greene received numerous awards and recognition for his research, teaching, and service to the scientific community. In October 2019, the journal Thin Solid Films dedicated a special issue to Greene that contained "54 new and review articles by scientists from around the globe who wish to acknowledge Joe's positive influence on the field of thin film physics as well as on their careers and research".

Significant awards and honors include the following:

=== For research ===
- John Thornton Award (American Vacuum Society, 1991)
- Tage Erlander Prize in Physics and Chaired Professorship (Swedish Natural Science Research Council, 1992–1995)
- Honorary Doctor of Science degree (honoris causa) in Physics (Linköping University, 1992)
- Named as Fellow of the American Vacuum Society (1993)
- Technical Excellence Award (Semiconductor Research Corporation, 1994)
- Sustained Outstanding Research Award in Metallurgy and Ceramics (U.S. Department of Energy, 1996)
- Named as Fellow of the American Physical Society (1998)
- David Turnbull Award (Materials Research Society, 1999) "for contributions to the use of non-thermal methods in the growth of thin films and the engineering of their phase, composition, and microstructure; and for excellence in teaching and writing"
- Elected to the National Academy of Engineering (2003) "for pioneering studies in the synthesis and characterization of epitaxial and highly ordered polycrystalline materials"
- Named as Fellow of the Materials Research Society (2013)
- George Sarton Award and Lecture (History of Science Society, 2016)
- Named George Sarton Chair for the History of Science (Ghent University, 2016)
- Nathaniel H. Sugerman Award (Society of Vacuum Coaters, 2018) for his "seminal scientific and educational contributions to the atomistic level understanding of the synthesis of nanostructured vacuum deposited coatings and thin film materials"
- R.F. Bunshah Award and Honorary Lecture (American Vacuum Society, 2019) for "seminal contributions in areas of thin-film physics, surface science, and surface engineering"
- Jan Czochralski Award (European Materials Research Society, 2022) in recognition and acknowledgement for his Lifetime Achievements in Materials Science

=== For teaching ===
- Senior University of Illinois Scholar (1991), for "distinction as a member of the faculty"
- David Adler Lectureship Award in the Field of Materials Physics (American Physical Society, 1998), for "outstanding research and lecturing on the physics and chemistry of thin films"
- Aristotle Mentor Award (Semiconductor Research Corporation, 1998)
- AVS Distinguished Lectureship (American Vacuum Society, 1998/99)
- Mentor Award (Society of Vacuum Coaters, 2015)
- World Expert Lecturer Award (University of the Philippines, 2016)

=== For service ===
- Lifetime Achievement Award (Taiwan Association for Coating and Thin Film Technology, 2013), for "seminal contributions to understanding the physics, chemistry and materials science of thin films and nanoclusters"

== Personal life ==
He was married to Phyllis Greene. He was a mountaineering enthusiast and volunteered as a search and rescue ranger at the Grand Teton National Park in Wyoming.

== Published works ==
In addition to numerous scholarly journal articles, Greene co-edited four books:

- Beam-Induced Chemical Processes (1985, Materials Research Society)
- Laser-Stimulated Chemical Vapor Deposition (American Vacuum Society, 1985)
- Physics and Chemistry of Protective Coatings (1986, American Institute of Physics)
- Processing and Characterization of Materials Using Ion Beams (1989, Materials Research Society)
