= Martinus von Biberach =

German theologian

Magister Martinus von Biberach (German: [fɔn ˈbiːbəʁax]; died 1498) was a theologian from Heilbronn, Germany. He is mostly remembered because of a priamel that has allegedly been his epitaph.

== Epitaph ==
Ich leb und ich waiß nit, wie lang
Ich stirb und waiß nit wann
Ich far und waiß nit, wahin
Mich wundert, daß ich froelich bin.

I live and don't know how long,
I'll die and don't know when,
I am going and don't know where,
I wonder that I am happy.

== Reception ==
While the attribution of the poem to Biberach is controversial, it has been cited and modified widely. Martin Luther in particular took issue with it, offering a contrary version in a sermon on John 8:46-59 for Judica Sunday: Ich lebe, so lang Gott will, / ich sterbe, wann und wie Gott will, / ich fahr und weiß gewiß, wohin, / mich wundert, daß ich traurig bin!
