= King effect =

Phenomenon in statistics where highest-ranked data points are outliers

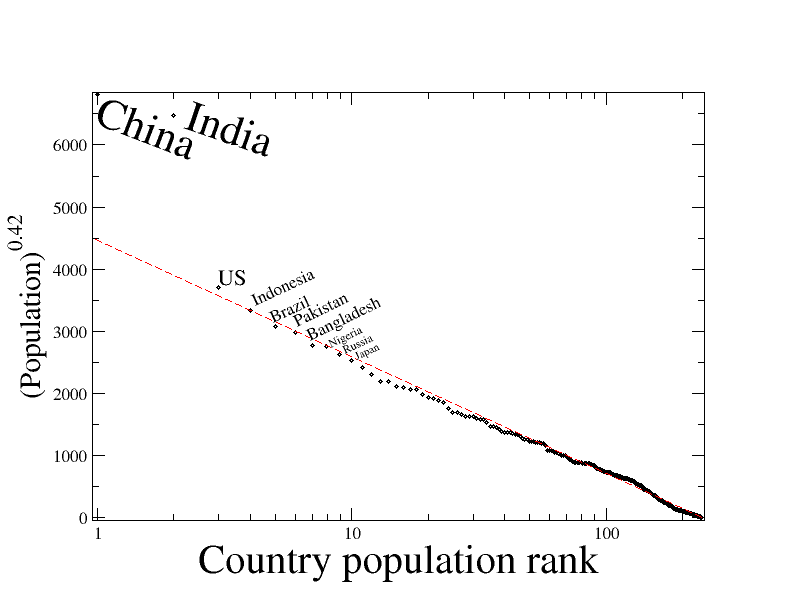
Rank-ordering of the population of countries follows a stretched exponential distribution except in the cases of the two "kings": China and India.

The king effect is the name given by Jean Laherrère and Didier Sornette to the phenomenon in natural distributions where the top one or two members of a ranked set are clear outliers. These top one or two members are unexpectedly large and do not conform to the statistical distribution or rank-distribution which the remainder of the set follows.

Distributions typically followed include the power-law distribution, that is a basis for the stretched exponential function, and parabolic fractal distribution. Laherrere and Sornette noted the King effect in the distributions of:

- French city sizes (where the point representing Paris is the "king", failing to conform to the stretched exponential), and similarly for other countries with a primate city, such as the United Kingdom (London), and the extreme case of Bangkok (see list of cities in Thailand).
- Country populations (where only the points representing China and India fail to fit a stretched exponential).
- The popularity of musicians, where Cliff Richard and Elvis Presley ("The King") are the outliers not fitting on a stretched exponential where success is determined by the number of weeks spent at the weekly top 75 rankings.

Note, however, that the king effect is not limited to outliers with a positive evaluation attached to their rank: for rankings on an undesirable attribute, there may exist a pauper effect, with a similar detachment of extremely ranked data points from the reasonably distributed portion of the data set.

== See also ==
- Zipf's law
- Didier Sornette
