= George Grigorovici =

Romanian politician

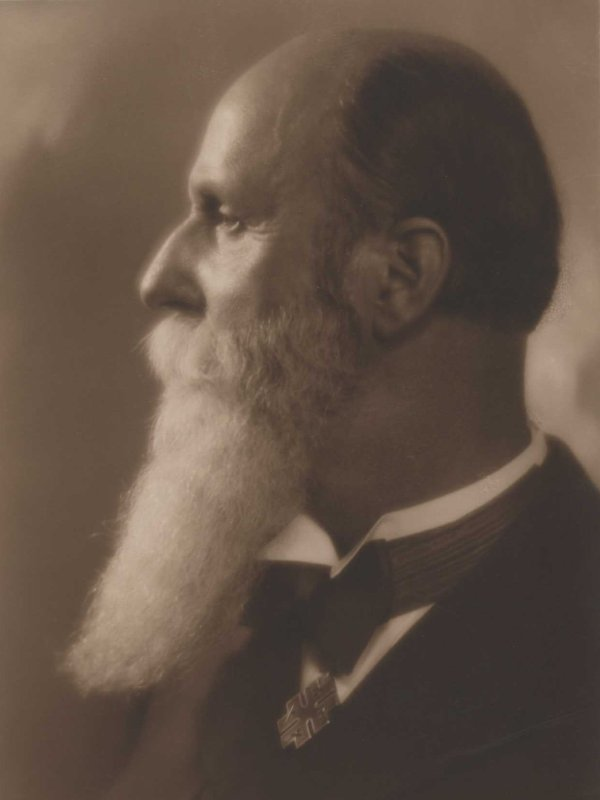

Member of the Reichsrat
- In office 1907–1918

Member of the Parliament of Romania

Personal details
- Born: May 4, 1871 Storozynetz, Duchy of Bukovina, Austria-Hungary (today in Ukraine)
- Died: July 18, 1950 (aged 79) Văcărești Prison, Bucharest, Romanian People's Republic
- Citizenship: Austria-Hungary (until 1918); Romania (after 1918)
- Party: Social Democratic Party of Austria (until 1918); PSDR (1927–1948)
- Spouse: Tatiana Grigorovici
- Children: Radu Grigorovici
- Education: Chernivtsi University; University of Vienna

George Grigorovici or Gheorghe Grigorovici (4 May 1871 – 18 July 1950) was an Austro-Hungarian-born Romanian politician.

== Biography ==
Gheorghe Grigorovici was born in May 1871 old style in the town of Storojineț in Duchy of Bukovina, then an Imperial province of Austria-Hungary (today in Ukraine). During the student years he joined the social-democratic movement; he joined the Social Democratic Party of Austria, he was noticed by conferences held in the working circles. He was delegated by the party leadership as a trustworthy man in Bukovina, in order to organize the workers in the Social Democratic Party and in trade unions.

On 10 October 1903 he married Tatiana Pisterman, the theoretician of Austrian and Romanian social democracy of Jewish origin, who worked hard on social assistance among the needy population in Czernowitz. He became editor of Volkspresse, the German-language newspaper of the Bukovinian Social Democrats, and then established Lupta, the first social-democratic Romanian-language newspaper from Bukovina.

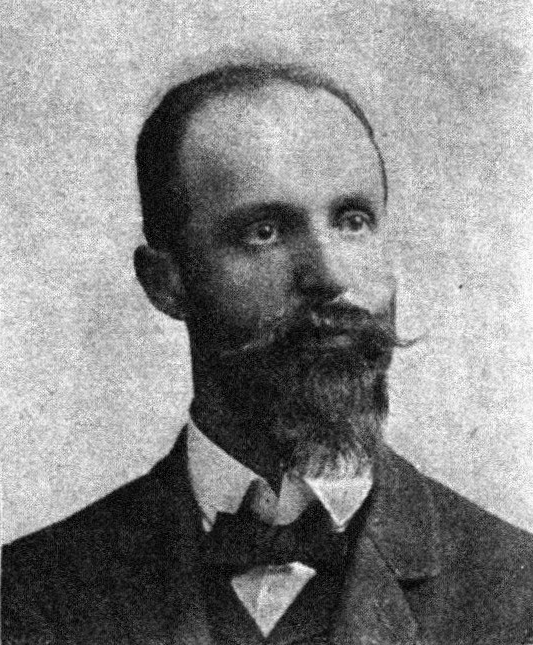
Grigorovici in 1907

In 1907, in Austria's first elections based on universal and equal votes, Grigorovici became the first Romanian Social-Democrat deputy in the Vienna Parliament. He used his position to harshly criticize the Austro-Hungarian state administration and to reveal the misery of workers and peasants in Bukovina. He was the first to use Romanian in the Austrian Parliament.

During World War I, Grigorovici became one of the main supporters of the unification of Bukovina and Romania. In his last speech in the Vienna Parliament on 22 October 1918, Grigorovici warned against attempts to prevent the Romanian-inhabited provinces of the Austro-Hungarian Empire from joining Romania: "No Romanian will ever give up the tendency to unite the Romanian people. The Union of Romanians is an ideal and a goal that Romanians have. The Union of Romanians is an ideal and a goal that Romanians will always follow, at any time, in all circumstances."

After the Great Union in December 1918, it became necessary to unify the socialist and social-democratic movements in Transylvania, Banat, Bukovina, Bessarabia, and the Old Kingdom. The lack of ideological unity has led to conflicts: "the Social Democrat George Grigorovici, autodeclared enemy of Russian and Hungarian Bolshevism" (as described in a Comintern call of 27 March 1920) and other representatives of the Social Democracy refused to accept unification in a "Bolshevik" party affiliated to the 3rd International, an idea supported by the communists. A few days later, Grigorovici emphasized before the Bucovina Social Democrats, in contrast to the "Bolshevitism" of unconscious people, that "democracy is the only road to socialism". In 1927, the left-wing parties that rejected unification with the communists joined, forming the Romanian Social-Democratic Party. In the 1920s, Grigorovici was also a Member of the Romanian Parliament. During the Royal dictatorship of King Carol II of Romania, he supported collaboration with the National Renaissance Front, as he was under state secretary at the Labor Ministry. He was expelled from the Social Democratic Party, which was reorganized around Constantin Titel Petrescu.

Grigorovici became a critic of the communist power officially established in 1948, stating that "politics is not being made under foreign occupation". Labeled as "a traitor of the working class", he was arrested on 13 June 1949 and detained without trial; he died on 18 July 1950 in Văcărești Prison.

The physicist Radu Grigorovici was his son. Nowadays, several streets in Romania are named after Gheorghe Grigorovici.
