= Otto Behaghel =

Germanist and professor (1854–1936)

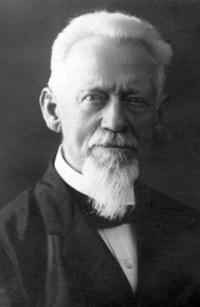
Otto Behaghel, date unknown

Otto Behaghel (German pronunciation: [ˈɔtoː beˈhaːɡəl]; May 3, 1854 in Karlsruhe – October 9, 1936 in Munich) was a Germanist and professor in Heidelberg, Basel, and Gießen.

He added theoretical contributions to the German and Middle High German language via philology and more. He formulated Behaghel's laws that describe the principles that govern word positions in a sentence. His work is still important in Theme and rheme research.

== Works ==
- Geschichte der deutschen Sprache (1891)
- Heliand und Genesis (1903)
- Deutsche Syntax, 3 volumes (1923–1928)
