= Primate city =

Disproportionately largest city of a country or region

Countries with a national primate city highlighted in yellow

A primate city (Note: Latin: 'prime, first rank') is a city that is the largest in its country, province, state, or region, and is disproportionately larger than any others in the urban hierarchy. A primate city distribution is a rank–size distribution that has one very large city with many much smaller cities and towns and no intermediate-sized urban centers, creating a statistical king effect.

The law of the primate city was first proposed by the geographer Mark Jefferson in 1939. He defines a primate city as being "at least twice as large as the next largest city and more than twice as significant." Aside from size and population, a primate city will usually have precedence in all other aspects of its country's society such as economics, politics, culture, and education. Primate cities also serve as targets for the majority of a country or region's internal migration.

In geography, the phenomenon of excessive concentration of population and development of the main city of a country or a region (often to the detriment of other areas) is called urban primacy or urban macrocephaly.

== Measurement ==
Urban primacy can be measured as the share of a country's population that lives in the primate city. Relative primacy indicates the ratio of the primate city's population to that of the second largest in a country or region.

== Significance ==
There is debate as to whether a primate city serves a parasitic or generative function. The presence of a primate city in a country may indicate an imbalance in development—usually a progressive core and a lagging periphery—on which the city depends for labor and other resources. However, the urban structure is not directly dependent on a country's level of economic development.

Many primate cities gain an increasing share of their country's population. This can be due to a reduction in blue-collar population in the hinterlands because of mechanization and automation. Simultaneously, the number of educated employees in white-collar endeavors such as politics, finance, media, and higher education rises. These sectors are clustered predominantly in primate cities where power and wealth are concentrated.

== Examples ==
Some global cities are considered national or regional primate cities. An example of a global city that is also a primate city is Istanbul in Turkey. Istanbul serves as the primate city of Turkey due to the unmatched economic, cultural, and educational influence that the city possesses in comparison to other Turkish cities such as the capital Ankara, İzmir, or Bursa. Likewise, Nairobi, Bangkok, Mexico City, Paris, Cairo, Jakarta, and Seoul have also been described as primate cities of their respective countries. However, not all regions and countries possess a primate city. The United States has never had a primate city on a national level due to the decentralized nature of the country and because the country's second-largest city, Los Angeles, is not far behind the country's largest city, New York City, in either population or GDP. The metropolitan area of New York City has over 19 million residents, while Los Angeles's has roughly 13 million residents, as of 2022.

Sub-national divisions can also have primate cities. For instance, New York City is the State of New York's primate city, because its population is 32 times bigger than the state's second-largest city of Buffalo. New York City has 44% of the population and 65% of the GDP of the State of New York. The city of Anchorage is another U.S. example, with around 40% of the total population of Alaska living within the city's limits. China does not have a primate city at a national level, but several provincial capitals are disproportionately larger than other urban areas in the respective provinces. For example, Henan, Hubei, and Sichuan have provincial capitals (Zhengzhou, Wuhan, and Chengdu, respectively) that are significantly larger than the second-largest cities in those provinces, and each of those provinces has a population similar to that of a large European country. Spain does not have a primate city at the national level because, although Madrid is the capital and the principal centre of Castilian culture, it is not overwhelmingly larger than Barcelona in either population or economic importance. Barcelona is also a major cultural centre in its own right as the capital of Catalonia and the historic centre of Catalan culture. However, the autonomous community of Catalonia has a clear primate city in Barcelona. Barcelona is several times larger than Catalonia's other major cities (excluding those within its own metropolitan area), such as Tarragona, Reus, Lleida and Girona, and functions as the region's dominant political, economic and cultural centre. It contains roughly one-fifth of Catalonia's population, while the Barcelona metropolitan area is home to over 40% of the autonomous community's residents. India does not have a primate city, as Delhi is not much larger than Mumbai or Kolkata in terms of population. However, many Indian states, such as Karnataka, West Bengal, Tamil Nadu and Telangana, do have primate cities: Bengaluru, Kolkata, Chennai, Hyderabad, respectively. Other Indian states, such as Uttar Pradesh and Kerala, do not have any primate cities.

Bangkok, the capital of Thailand, has been called "the most primate city on Earth": in 2000 it was 40 times larger than the second-largest city of that time, Nakhon Ratchasima. As of 2022, Bangkok is nearly nine times larger than Thailand's current second-largest city of Chiang Mai, which has been growing in population and has also had its boundaries expanded to reflect that growth. Taking the concept from his examination of the primate city during the 2010 Thai political protests and applying it to the role that primate cities play if they are national capitals, researcher Jack Fong noted that when primate cities like Bangkok function as national capitals, they are inherently vulnerable to insurrection by the military and the dispossessed. He cites the fact that most primate cities serving as national capitals contain major headquarters for the country. Thus, logistically, it is rather "efficient" to target a national capital that is also a primate city; most of the governing power is contained in that one small area, and so are most of the people.

The metropolitan area of the city of Moscow, the capital of Russia, is 2.3 times the size of the metropolitan area of the next largest city, Saint Petersburg, and plays a dominant role as the cultural and political center of the country. It can therefore be considered a primate city.

Primate cities need not be capital cities: governments may establish a new capital city in an attempt to challenge the primacy of the largest city or provide more balanced growth. For example, in Tanzania, Dar es Salaam is still the primate city even though the capital was moved to Dodoma, a new city built to a plan, in 1996. A similar process (though without building a planned city) occurred when the existing city of Wellington was chosen as New Zealand's capital in 1865; Auckland, the capital before the relocation, commanded (and still commands) a greater share of the population and economy.

== List ==
=== Africa ===
Country	Primate	Population	Second largest	Population	Relative primacy
Ethiopia	Addis Ababa	3,352,000	Adama	342,940	9.8
Algeria	Algiers	7,896,923	Oran	1,560,329	5.1
Madagascar	Antananarivo	1,275,207	Toamasina	300,813	4.2
Eritrea	Asmara	650,000	Keren	82,198	7.9
Mali	Bamako	1,810,366	Sikasso	226,618	8.0
Central African Republic	Bangui	622,771	Bimbo	124,176	5.0
Gambia	Banjul-Serekunda area	519,835	Brikama	101,119	5.1
Guinea-Bissau	Bissau	492,004	Gabu	48,670	10.1
Egypt	Cairo	22,183,000	Alexandria	6,100,000	3.6
Guinea	Conakry	1,660,973	Nzérékoré	195,027	8.5
Senegal	Dakar	2,646,503	Touba	753,315	3.5
Tanzania	Dar es Salaam	7,000,000	Mwanza	1,104,521	6.4
Djibouti	Djibouti City	475,322	Ali Sabieh	37,939	12.5
Cape Verde	Praia	189,897	Mindelo	70,468	2.7
Sierra Leone	Freetown	1,500,234	Bo	233,684	6.4
Somaliland (Note: Somaliland is a state with limited recognition, and is only recognized as a country by Taiwan and Israel.)	Hargeisa	1,200,000	Burao	425,000	2.8
Uganda	Kampala	1,507,080	Nansana	365,124	4.1
Rwanda	Kigali	1,132,686	Butare	89,600	12.6
Democratic Republic of the Congo	Kinshasa	17,239,463	Mbuji-Mayi	2,643,000	7.3
Nigeria	Lagos	16,637,000	Kano	4,490,734	3.7
Gabon	Libreville	703,904	Port Gentil	136,462	5.2
Togo	Lomé	1,477,660	Sokodé	118,000	12.5
Angola	Luanda	8,069,612	Lubango	903,564	8.9
Zambia	Lusaka	2,238,569	Kitwe	522,092	4.3
Lesotho	Maseru	330,760	Teyateyaneng	75,115	4.4
Liberia	Monrovia	1,101,970	Ganta	41,106	26.8
Kenya	Nairobi	5,500,000	Mombasa	1,208,333	4.6
Chad	N'Djamena	1,605,696	Moundou	137,929	11.6
Niger	Niamey	1,243,500	Zinder	235,605	5.3
Mauritania	Nouakchott	1,446,761	Nouadhibou	173,525	8.3
Sudan	Omdurman-Khartoum area	5,490,000	Port Sudan	489,725	11.2
Burkina Faso	Ouagadougou	2,500,000	Bobo Dioulaso	537,728	4.6
São Tomé and Príncipe	São Tomé	71,868	Santo Amaro	8,239	8.7
Tunisia	Tunis	2,643,695	Sfax	1,018,341	2.6
Seychelles	Victoria	26,450	Anse Boileau	4,093	6.5
Namibia	Windhoek	325,858	Walvis Bay	62,096	5.2

=== Asia ===
Country	Primate	Population	Second largest	Population	Relative primacy
Jordan	Amman	4,425,000	Irbid	750,000	5.9
Turkmenistan	Ashgabat	1,168,000	Türkmenabat	253,000	4.6
Iraq	Baghdad	8,126,755	Mosul	1,792,000	4.5
Azerbaijan	Baku	2,934,000	Ganja	335,000	8.8
Brunei	Bandar Seri Begawan	280,000	Kuala Belait	70,000	4.0
Thailand	Bangkok	16,255,900 (Note: based on Bangkok Metropolitan Region)	Chiang Mai	1,213,000	13.4
Lebanon	Beirut	2,781,000	Tripoli	365,000	7.6
Kyrgyzstan	Bishkek	1,297,000	Osh	282,000	4.6
Sri Lanka	Colombo	5,648,000	Kandy	125,400	45.0
Bangladesh	Dhaka	22,478,116	Chittagong	5,252,842	4.3
Timor-Leste	Dili	235,000	Baucau	15,000	15.7
Tajikistan	Dushanbe	1,390,000	Khujand	182,000	7.6
Palestine	Gaza City	766,331	Hebron	308,750	2.5
Turkey	Istanbul	15,569,856	Ankara	5,187,949	3.0
Indonesia	Jakarta	32,594,159	Surabaya	9,958,656	3.2
Afghanistan	Kabul	4,834,000	Kandahar	570,000	8.5
Nepal	Kathmandu	3,941,000	Pokhara	523,000	9.8
Malaysia	Kuala Lumpur	9,085,737	George Town	2,815,278	3.2
Kuwait	Kuwait City	4,022,000	Al Jahra	400,000	10.1
Maldives	Malé	135,000	Addu City	34,000	4.0
Oman	Muscat	1,205,000	Salalah	340,000	3.5
Cambodia	Phnom Penh	2,177,000	Siem Reap	140,000	15.6
North Korea	Pyongyang	2,228,000	Hamhung	535,000	4.2
Yemen	Sana'a	3,300,000	Aden	1,154,000	2.9
South Korea	Seoul	26,085,040	Busan	6,804,956	3.8
Uzbekistan	Tashkent	3,492,000	Samarkand	1,201,000	2.9
Georgia	Tbilisi	1,207,000	Batumi	200,000	6.0
Iran	Tehran	13,633,000	Mashhad	3,167,000	4.3
Israel	Tel Aviv	4,054,570 (Note: based on Tel Aviv metropolitan area)	Jerusalem	1,075,800 (Note: based on Greater Jerusalem. This figure includes both West and East Jerusalem, and other localities of the Israeli Jerusalem District, but does not include adjacent localities in the West Bank, be they Israeli settlements such as Ma'ale Adumim or Palestinian localities such as Ramallah and Bethlehem.)	3.77
Bhutan	Thimphu	115,000	Phuntsholing	28,000	4.1
Japan	Tokyo	41,000,000	Keihanshin (Osaka)	19,060,000	2.1
Laos	Vientiane	1,058,000	Savannakhet	120,000	8.8
Mongolia	Ulaanbaatar	1,752,000	Erdenet	112,520	15.6
Myanmar	Yangon	7,360,703	Mandalay	1,726,889	4.3
Armenia	Yerevan	1,403,000	Gyumri	130,000	10.8

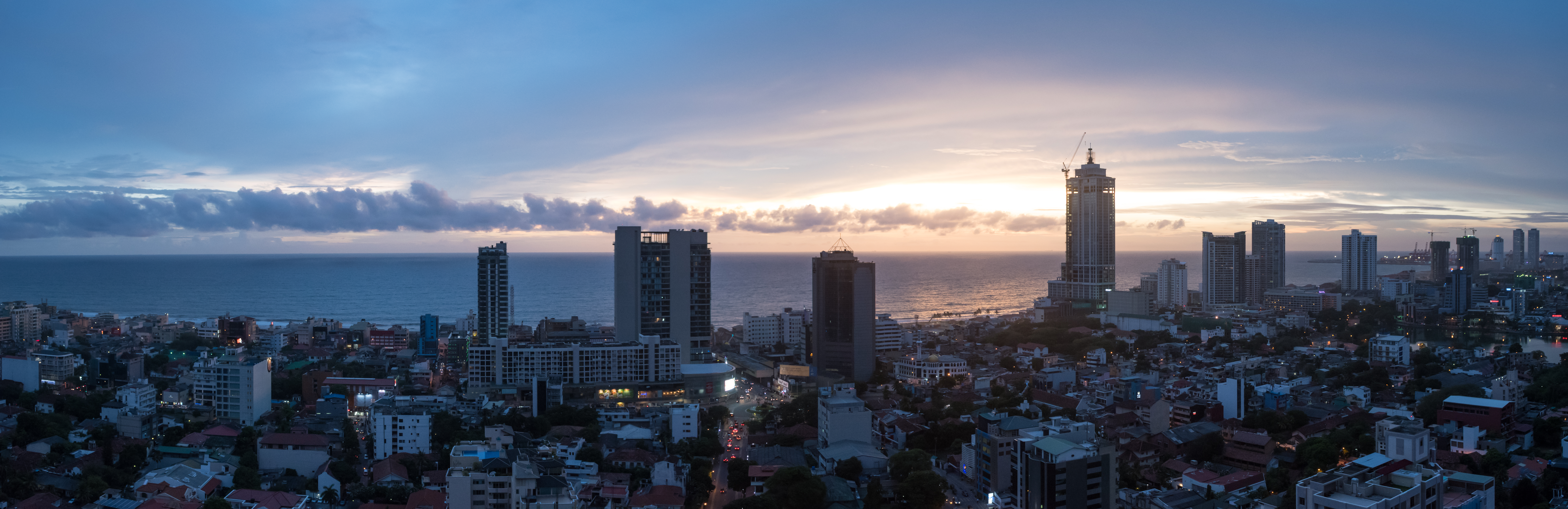
Colombo, the primate city of Sri Lanka; it is 45 times larger than Kandy, the country's second-largest city.

For the Philippines, figures are for Metro Manila and Metro Cebu. Manila is the national capital, which is within Metro Manila, a region. Meanwhile, Cebu City is the capital city of the province of Cebu, with Metro Cebu being its main urban center. Metro Manila is within Mega Manila, the megapolis that has a population of around 25 million.

For Malaysia, data for Kuala Lumpur includes the surrounding state of Selangor and the Federal Territory of Putrajaya; while data for George Town includes the entire State of Penang and adjoining regions of Kulim and Kuala Muda (Sungai Petani) in the neighboring State of Kedah.

In Vietnam, Hanoi (population ~9 million) is the primate city of Northern Vietnam, having 1.92 times the population of the area's second largest, Haiphong (4,664,124). Ho Chi Minh City (population 14,002,598) is the primate city of Southern Vietnam, having 3.34 times the population of the area's second largest, Cần Thơ (4,199,824). However, there's no primate city in Central Vietnam as the most populous city (Da Nang, population 1,134,310) has nearly the same population of the area's next largest (Huế, population 1,128,620). See also: List of cities in Vietnam

=== Europe ===
Country	Primate	Population	Second largest	Population	Relative primacy
Greece	Athens	3,753,783	Thessaloniki	1,084,001	3.5
Serbia	Belgrade	1,681,405	Novi Sad	368,967	4.5
Romania	Bucharest	2,272,163	Cluj-Napoca	411,379	5.5
Hungary	Budapest	1,686,222	Debrecen	201,704	8.4
Moldova	Chișinău	736,100	Tiraspol (de jure) (Note: Tiraspol is controlled and claimed by the unrecognised Pridnestrovian Moldavian Republic (Transnistria), and serves as the breakaway state's largest city and capital. The second largest city controlled by Moldova, and the third largest within its recognised borders is Bălți, with a population of 102,457 (7.18 times smaller than Chișinău).)	135,700	5.4
Denmark	Copenhagen	2,016,285	Aarhus	330,639	6.1
Ireland	Dublin	1,263,219	Cork	222,526	5.7
Finland	Helsinki	1,522,694 (Note: based on Helsinki metropolitan area)	Tampere	385,610	3.9
Ukraine	Kyiv	2,952,301	Kharkiv	1,421,125	2.1
United Kingdom	London	9,089,736	Manchester	3,009,664	3.0
Luxembourg	Luxembourg	107,247	Esch-sur-Alzette	32,600	3.3
Belarus	Minsk	2,101,018	Gomel	526,872	4.0
Russia	Moscow	13,010,112	St. Petersburg	5,601,911	2.3
Norway	Oslo	1,110,887	Bergen	273,626	4.05
France	Paris	12,405,426	Lyon	2,237,676	5.5
Czech Republic	Prague	1,397,880	Brno	402,739	3.9
Iceland	Reykjavík	209,680 (Note: based on Capital Region (Iceland))	Akureyri	18,191	11.5
Latvia	Riga	605,273	Daugavpils	77,779	7.6
North Macedonia	Skopje	422,540	Kumanovo	75,051	5.6
Bulgaria	Sofia	1,681,666	Plovdiv	544,628	3.1
Sweden	Stockholm	2,415,139 (Note: based on Stockholm metro area)	Gothenburg	1,080,980	2.2
Estonia	Tallinn	456,518	Tartu	100,685	4.5
Albania	Tirana	800,986	Durrës	201,110	4.0
Austria	Vienna	2,600,000	Graz	302,660	8.6
Lithuania	Vilnius	602,408	Kaunas	304,177	2.0
Croatia	Zagreb	760,020	Split	180,568	4.2

The list contains 26 countries (Turkey is listed with Asia). If excluding the microstates (which are not listed here and often have one city only) and the countries of disputed connection to Europe (Armenia, Azerbaijan, Cyprus, Georgia and Kazakhstan), Europe has 40 countries, and 13 of them are without primate cities. These are Belgium, Bosnia and Herzegovina, Germany, Italy, Malta, Montenegro, the Netherlands, Poland, Portugal, Slovakia, Slovenia, Spain, and Switzerland.

In Germany, Munich (city proper population of ca 1.5 million, with surrounding Landkreise ~3 million) is the primate city of the state of Bavaria, having nearly three times the population of the state's second-largest, Nuremberg (ca 500,000 people, metro area ~1.35 million). Likewise, in Hesse, Frankfurt (~750,000 people) is nearly three times larger than the state's second-largest, Wiesbaden (~275,000), and they are both part of the Rhine-Main metropolitan area. The largest city outside of the area, Kassel, has a population of ca. 200,000 people.

In Italy, primate cities exist at the regional level: the capital, Rome (~2.7 million), alone has nearly half of the population of the Lazio region and is about 21 times larger than the second-largest city, Latina, and nearly three quarters of the region's population live in the Metropolitan City of Rome Capital. In Lombardy, Milan at ~1.35 million is seven times larger than second-largest Brescia (ca 200,000); in Piedmont, Turin has eight-nine times the population of Novara and Alessandria; in Campania, Naples has 7 times the population of second-largest Salerno and in Liguria, Genoa at ~550,000 has six times the population of second-largest La Spezia and the Metropolitan City of Genoa has three times the population of the Province of Savona.

There are many more regional primate cities in Europe. If excluding national capitals, examples include Gothenburg in Västra Götaland, Sweden, Bergen in Vestland and Trondheim in Trøndelag, Norway, Tampere in Pirkanmaa, Finland and Aarhus in Midtjylland, Denmark.

In Portugal, the Lisbon Metropolitan Area has around 2.8 million people while the Porto Metropolitan Area, the second-biggest and other only official metropolitan area, has around 1.7 million people. These two metropolitan areas have around 40% the country's population and are multiple times larger than the third-biggest city, Braga.

=== North and Central America ===
Country	Primate	Population	Second largest	Population	Relative primacy
Saint Kitts and Nevis	Basseterre	13,000	Sandy Point Town	3,140	4.1
Belize	Belize City	65,834	San Ignacio	21,229	3.1
Barbados	Bridgetown	110,000	Oistins	3,000	36.7
Saint Lucia	Castries	70,000	Gros Islet	22,647	3.1
Guatemala	Guatemala City	2,749,161	Quetzaltenango	792,530	3.5
Cuba	Havana	2,106,146	Santiago de Cuba	433,099	4.9
Jamaica	Kingston	584,627	Portmore	182,153	3.2
Saint Vincent and the Grenadines	Kingstown	16,500	Georgetown	1,700	9.7
Nicaragua	Managua	1,401,687	León	213,718	6.6
Mexico	Mexico City	20,400,000	Monterrey	5,370,466	4.1
Bahamas	Nassau	274,400	Freeport	26,914	10.2
Panama	Panama City	880,691	La Chorrera	118,521	7.4
Haiti	Port-au-Prince	2,618,894	Cap-Haïtien	274,404	9.5
Dominica	Roseau	16,582	Portsmouth	2,977	5.6
Costa Rica	San José	2,158,898	Puerto Limón	58,522	36.9
El Salvador	San Salvador	2,406,709	Santa Ana	374,830	10.0
Dominican Republic	Santo Domingo	2,908,607	Santiago de los Caballeros	553,091	5.3
Grenada	St. George's	33,734	Grenville	2,400	14.1
Antigua and Barbuda	St. John's	22,219	All Saints	3,829	5.8

In the United States, many primate cities exist at the state level. In California, the population of Los Angeles (~4 million) is nearly three times that of the second-largest city in the state, San Diego. Likewise, in Illinois, Chicago has 15 times the population of the state's second-largest city, Aurora, which itself is a suburb of Chicago, and 18 times the population of Rockford, the state's fifth-largest city and the largest outside of the Chicago metropolitan area, which comprises nearly two-thirds of the state's population. In New York, New York City, with a 2022 population of about 8.3 million, is more than 30 times larger than the state's second-largest city of Buffalo. Erie County, where Buffalo is located, is the eighth-largest county in the state and the largest outside of the New York metropolitan area, with around 950,000 residents; on the other hand, New York City alone contains four of the six largest counties in the state, each with at least 1.35 million residents. In the Southwest, the Las Vegas metropolitan area comprises nearly three-quarters of the population of Nevada, and the Phoenix metropolitan area represents almost two-thirds of the population of Arizona.

Canada also has several primate cities at the provincial level: Vancouver for British Columbia; Winnipeg for Manitoba; Toronto for Ontario; Montreal for Quebec; Halifax for Nova Scotia; and St. John's for Newfoundland and Labrador.

=== Oceania ===
Country	Primate	Population	Second largest	Population	Relative primacy
Samoa	Apia	36,735	Afega	1,781	20.6
New Zealand	Auckland	1,794,400	Christchurch	556,500	3.2
Tuvalu	Funafuti	6,025	Asau	650	9.3
Solomon Islands	Honiara	64,609	Auki	7,785	8.3
Tonga	Nukuʻalofa	24,571	Neiafu	6,000	4.1
Papua New Guinea	Port Moresby	410,954	Lae	76,255	5.4
Fiji	Suva	175,399	Lautoka	52,220	3.4
Kiribati	South Tarawa	50,182	Abaiang	5,502	9.1

Australia does not have a primate city, but at the state level, each of the capital cities of the states and territories act as the primate city of that state or territory.

=== South America ===
Country	Primate	Population	Second largest	Population	Relative primacy
Paraguay	Gran Asunción	2,698,401	Ciudad del Este	293,817	9.2
Colombia	Bogotá	8,034,649	Medellín	3,591,963	2.2
Argentina	Buenos Aires	12,741,364	Córdoba	1,528,000	8.3
Guyana	Georgetown	118,363	Linden	29,298	4.0
Peru	Lima	9,752,000	Arequipa	1,034,736	9.4
Uruguay	Montevideo	1,947,604	Salto	104,028	18.7
Suriname	Paramaribo	240,924	Lelydorp	19,910	12.1
Chile	Santiago	6,685,685	Valparaíso	1,036,127	6.5

Brazil does not have a primate city, but Brazilian state capitals typically act as the primate city for their respective state.

== See also ==
- City-state
- Capital city
- Primate (disambiguation)
- Global city
- Megacity
- Metropolis
- Rank–size distribution
- Secondary city
