= Journal of Non-Crystalline Solids =

- Discipline: Physical chemistry
- Language: English
- Edited by: Lina Hu, Liping Huang, Morten Smedskjaer, Edgar Dutra Zanotto

Publication details
- History: 1968–present
- Publisher: Elsevier
- Frequency: Biweekly
- Open access: Hybrid
- Impact factor: 3.6 (2025)

Standard abbreviations
- ISO 4: J. Non-Cryst. Solids

Indexing
- CODEN: JNCSBJ
- ISSN: 0022-3093

Links
- Journal homepage; Online access

Journal of Non-Crystalline Solids is a biweekly peer-reviewed scientific journal covering research on amorphous materials, such as glass. It was established in 1968 and is published by Elsevier. The current editors-in-chief are Lina Hu (Shandong University of Science and Technology), Liping Huang (Rensselaer Polytechnic Institute), Morten Smedskjaer (Aalborg University), and Edgar D. Zanotto (Universidade Federal de São Carlos).

== Abstracting and indexing ==
The journal is abstracted and indexed in:

- Chemical Abstracts Service - CASSI
- Web of Science

According to the Journal Citation Reports, the journal has a 2025 impact factor of 3.6.
