= Thin Solid Films =

Scientific journal

- Discipline: Thin-film synthesis, applied physics
- Language: English
- Edited by: J. E. Greene

Publication details
- Former name: Symposium on Plasma Science for Materials
- History: 1967–present
- Publisher: Elsevier
- Frequency: Biweekly
- Impact factor: 2.183 (2020)

Standard abbreviations
- ISO 4: Thin Solid Films

Indexing
- CODEN: THSFAP
- ISSN: 0040-6090
- LCCN: 81005059
- OCLC no.: 1605925

Links
- Journal homepage; Online access

Thin Solid Films is a peer-reviewed scientific journal published 24 times per year by Elsevier. It was established in July 1967. The current editor-in-chief is J. E. Greene (University of Illinois at Urbana–Champaign).

== Aims and scope ==
The journal covers research on thin-film synthesis, characterization, and applications, including synthesis, surfaces, interfaces, colloidal behavior, metallurgical topics, mechanics (including nanomechanics), electronics, optics, optoelectronics, magnetics, magneto-optics, and superconductivity.

== Abstracting and indexing ==
The journal is indexed and abstracted in:

- Cambridge Scientific Abstracts
- Chemical Abstracts
- Chemical Abstracts Service
- Current Contents/Engineering, Computing & Technology
- Current Contents/Physical, Chemical & Earth Sciences
- Engineering Index
- Inspec
- Metals Abstracts
- PASCAL
- Physikalische Berichte
- Science Citation Index
- Scopus

According to the Journal Citation Reports, the journal has a 2020 impact factor of 2.183.
