= Mark Jefferson (geographer) =

American geographer (1863–1949)

Mark Jefferson (1863–1949) was the chief cartographer of the American Delegation to the Paris Peace Conference in 1919. He was also the head of the geography department at Michigan State Normal College (MSNC), now Eastern Michigan University (EMU), from 1901-1939.

Jefferson received his bachelor's degree from Boston University and his master's degree from Harvard University. From 1883-1889 he worked at an astronomical observatory in Argentina. From 1890-1901 he was a high school teacher in Massachusetts. In addition to teaching at MSNC he also taught at the Harvard Summer School. Among Jefferson's students were geographers Isaiah Bowman and Charles C. Colby.

In 1916 Jefferson served as president of the American Association of Geographers.

Today, he is especially remembered for introducing the concept of the primate city, a culturally dominant city found in some countries.

A biography of Jefferson entitled Mark Jefferson: Geographer written by Geoffrey J. Martin was published by Eastern Michigan University Press in 1968. EMU has a building named after Mark Jefferson.

== Sources ==
- CSISS article based on Jefferson's work
- Aurora (MSNC yearbook) 1918.
- Annals of the American Association of Geographers Vol. 39, no. 4
