= Behaghel's laws =

Linguistic laws regarding syntax

Behaghel's laws describe the basic principles of the position of words and phrases in a sentence. They were formulated by the linguist Otto Behaghel in the last volume of his four volume work Deutsche Syntax: Eine geschichtliche Darstellung (published 1923–1932).

They include the following cross-language principles:

1. Elements that belong close together intellectually will also be placed close together (Behaghel's First Law)
2. That which is less important (or already known to the listener) is placed before that which is important. (Behaghel's Second Law)
3. The distinguishing phrase precedes that which is distinguished.
4. Given two phrases, when possible, the shorter precedes the longer. (Law of Increasing Terms (or Constituents))

It is thus ensured that the utterances that the speaker finds important will remain in the thoughts of the listener, in that they are at the end of the sentence. From Behaghel's laws evolved the later Theme-rheme. They serve together with other of his topics as suggestions for research in Quantitative Linguistics.

Behaghel's law of increasing terms is also known as "Panini's law" after the eponymous Sanskrit grammarian. This name was introduced by William Cooper and John Ross (1975) in their study of English set phrases. English examples include "free and easy", "lock, stock and barrel", "kit and (ca)boodle", etc. Michael O'Connor (1978) has observed a similar statistical preference in the case of Biblical Hebrew poetry.

== Literature ==
- Otto Behaghel: Beziehungen zwischen Umfang und Reihenfolge von Satzgliedern. In: Indogermanische Forschungen 25, 1909, 110–142.
- Karl-Heinz Best: Otto Behaghel (1854-1936). In: Glottometrics 14, 2007, 80-86 (PDF ram-verlag.eu).
