= Urban hierarchy =

Rank of cities based on their population

The urban hierarchy ranks each city based on the size of population residing within the nationally defined statistical urban area. Because urban population depends on how governments define their metropolitan areas, urban hierarchies are conventionally ranked at the national level. However, the ranking can be extended globally to include all cities. Urban hierarchies tell us about the general organization of cities and yield some important insights. First, it tells us that within a system of cities, some cities will grow to be very large, but that number will be small relative to the universe of cities. Second, it refutes the expectation of an optimally sized city. Lastly, it establishes cities as belonging to an inter-related network where one city's growth affects others'.

== Theoretical distribution ==
The hierarchy is usually related to the empirical regularity with which cities are distributed. The pattern has been formulated in a number of ways, but usually as a variation of the power law. Formally, it is a frequency distribution of rank data where the frequency is inversely proportional to rank such that cities with population larger than S are approximately proportional to S^{−a}, where a is normally close to 1. There are no good explanations for the exponent consistently being close to 1. This is problematic because an exponent of 1 in the power law implies an infinite population. Paul Krugman proposes that, in the case of cities, the power law operates according to the percolation theory. This relaxes the condition on the exponent approaching the value of 1 and breaking down the model. Importantly, the application of a percolation model leads to one of the key insights regarding city sizes: geography and economic conditions give cities advantages that allow them to grow more than cities with a relative scarcity of these benefits.

A simpler formulation of the relationship between rank and frequency is expressed with reference to Zipf's law. The law applied to cities states that "if cities are ranked in decreasing population size, then the rank of a given city will be inversely proportional to its population." According to this intuitive formulation, in a country where the largest city has a population of 10 million, the second largest will have a population size of 5 million, the third largest 3.33 million, etc.

== Empirical evidence ==
The urban hierarchy has been described in detail in the United States where the power law has held consistently for over a century. In 1991, there were 40 U.S. Metropolitan Areas with population above 1 million, 20 above 2 million, and 9 with more than 4 million.

Recent advances in data collection have allowed researchers to test the theoretical distribution against global data. Shlomo Angel finds that the pattern holds remarkably well for a global sample of 3,646 cities. The predicted distribution based on Zipf's law and the actual distribution are virtually identical. The most common size ranges from 100,000 to 200,000 and constitutes about half of the entire sample. The distribution extends to the largest cities with population over 2.5 million.

== Explanation ==
While the frequency distribution of urban hierarchies is empirically simple, the set of factors that create it is complex and no individual explanation can account for the distribution. The unequal distribution of city sizes and lack of convergence on one equilibrium size are relatively well understood. Henderson's model of urban systems relies on three sets of factors that influence the size of cities: land inputs, labor, and capital. The model formally relates the benefits of economies of agglomeration and congestion cost. Cities benefit from economies of scale that attract firms and workers, making them larger. But, the limited supply of land means that the price of locating near the center of production increases as the population size increases. Eventually, the greater costs lead to diminishing returns to scale and cities tend towards an optimal equilibrium size, assuming they all share the same attributes. Henderson relaxed the assumption of identical cities to explore the implications of a diversified economy of traded goods. The extension of the model underlies the urban system literature and gives rise to the finding that cities will differ in size to account for the factor rewards associated with traded goods of varying degrees of return to scale and intensity of land use.

== Alternative hierarchy ==
While the pattern of urban hierarchy tends to conform to the power law, it is not universal. Especially at the country level, significant deviations from the theoretical distribution are observed. Countries with a primate city, a city that dominates in population size and, usually, economically, have a deficit of intermediate size cities. Examples of primate cities include Paris in France, London in the United Kingdom, and Tokyo in Japan. The history of these countries plays a large role in the persistence of their primate city. Particularly, the concentration of political power in one city early on has a large degree of path dependency.
