= Primate (disambiguation) =

A primate is any member of the biological order of Primates, including monkeys and apes, the latter including humans.

Primate may also refer to:

== People ==
- Primate (bishop), a title/rank bestowed on (arch)bishops within some Christian churches
- Primates (journal), a scientific journal
- Prince primate, a title formerly given in German and Hungarian nations
- Primates or Kodjabashis, local Christian notables in parts of Ottoman Greece, especially the Peloponnese

== Geography ==
- Primate's Palace, a palace in Slovakia
- Primate, Saskatchewan, a former village in Canada

== Others ==
- Primate (1974 film), a documentary film directed by Frederick Wiseman
- "Primates" (Life), a 2009 documentary episode
- Primate (2025 film), a horror film

== See also ==
- Primate city
