= Burila Mare =

Place in Romania

- Commune
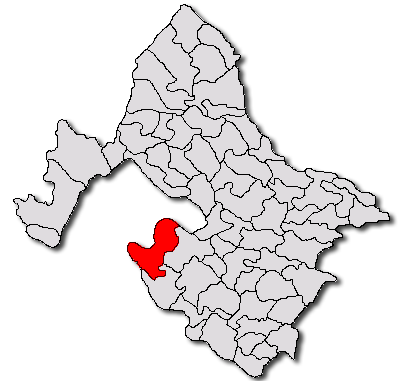
- Location in Mehedinți County

- Location in Romania
- Coordinates: 44°27′N 22°34′E
- Country: Romania
- County: Mehedinți

Government
  - Mayor (2024–2028): Jenică Cicic (PSD)
- Area: 123.82 km^{2} (47.81 sq mi)
- Elevation: 102 m (335 ft)
- Population (2021-12-01): 1,894
  - Density: 15/km^{2} (40/sq mi)
- Time zone: EET/EEST (UTC+2/+3)
- Postal code: 227085
- Area code: +(40) 252
- Vehicle reg.: MH
- Website: primariaburilamare.ro

Burila Mare is a commune located in Mehedinți County, Oltenia, Romania. It is composed of five villages: Burila Mare, Crivina, Izvoru Frumos, Țigănași, and Vrancea.

== Settlements ==
- Burila Mare
- Crivina
- Izvoru Frumos
- Țigănași
- Vrancea

== Demographics ==
Historical population
Year	Pop.	±%
2002	2,749	—
2011	2,239	−18.6%
2021	1,894	−15.4%
Source: Census data

== Natives ==
- Ștefan Burileanu (1874–1944), officer, engineer, inventor, and academic who rose to the rank of major general
- Ioan-Iovitz Popescu (born 1932), physicist, linguist, academic, and member of the Romanian Academy
