= Gabriel Altmann =

Slovak-German linguist and mathematician

- Born: 24 May 1931; Poltár, Czechoslovakia
- Died: 2 March 2020 (aged 88); Lüdenscheid, Germany
- Known for: Menzerath's law Contributions to quantitative linguistics
- Scientific career
- Fields: Linguistics, mathematics
- Institutions: Ruhr University Bochum

Gabriel Altmann (24 May 1931 – 2 March 2020) was a Slovak-German linguist and mathematician. He made significant contributions to the field of quantitative linguistics. He is best known for co-developing Menzerath's law, also known as the Menzerath-Altmann law, which describes the relationship between the size of a linguistic construct and the size of its linguistic constituents.

== Biography ==
Altmann was born on 24 May 1931 in Poltár, Czechoslovakia. He spent much of his career as a professor at Ruhr University Bochum in Germany.

Over his long career, Altmann authored numerous books and articles focused on quantitative linguistics. He served as the founding editor of the book series Quantitative Linguistics, which publishes works on all aspects of quantitative methods and models in linguistics. He was also on the editorial boards of several journals in the field, such as Journal of Quantitative Linguistics.

Altmann made key contributions to establishing the fundamental principles of quantitative linguistics. In addition to his work on Menzerath's law, he helped develop a unified derivation of several linguistic laws. His research applied mathematical and statistical methods to analyze various facets of language, from word length distributions to syntactic structures.

== Works ==
- Einführung in die quantitative Lexikologie (1980)
- Wiederholungen in Texten (1988)
- Quantitative Linguistics: An International Handbook (2005)

== See also ==
- Zipf's law
