= National University Research Council =

National University Research Council (Consiliul Naţional al Cercetării Ştiinţifice) is the Romanian national research funding body, and the accrediting body for academic journals and academic publishers. It was established in late 1994, and is located in Bucharest.

It is a member of the European Science Foundation.

In 1999, the council established the National Center for Science Policy and Scientometrics (Centrul Naţional pentru Politica Ştiinţei şi Scientometrie; CENAPOSS) to develop and promote Romanian research.

Journals are ranked as "A", "B+" or "B".
