= List of loanwords in Indonesian =

The Indonesian language has absorbed many loanwords from other languages, Sanskrit, Tamil, Chinese, Japanese, Arabic, Hebrew, Persian, Portuguese, Dutch, English, French, Greek, Latin and other Austronesian languages.

Indonesian differs from the form of Malay used in Brunei, Malaysia and Singapore in a number of aspects, primarily due to the different influences both languages experienced and also due to the fact that the majority of Indonesians speak another language as their mother tongue. Indonesian functions as the lingua franca for speakers of 700 various languages across the archipelago.

Conversely, many words of Malay-Indonesian origin have also been borrowed into English. Words borrowed into English (e.g., bamboo, orangutan, dugong, amok, and even "cooties") generally entered through Malay language by way of British colonial presence in Malaysia and Singapore, similar to the way the Dutch have been borrowing words from the various native Indonesian languages. One exception is "bantam", derived from the name of the Indonesian province Banten in Western Java (see Oxford American Dictionary, 2005 edition). Another is "lahar" which is Javanese for a volcanic mudflow. Still other words taken into modern English from Malay/Indonesian probably have other origins (e.g., "satay" from Tamil, or "ketchup" from Chinese).

During development, various native terms from all over the archipelago made their way into the language. The Dutch adaptation of the Malay language during the colonial period resulted in the incorporation of a significant number of Dutch loanwords and vocabulary. This event significantly affected the original Malay language, which gradually developed into modern Indonesian. Most terms are documented in Kamus Besar Bahasa Indonesia.

== Chronology ==
The study of Indonesian etymology and loan words reflects its historical and social context. Examples include the early Sanskrit borrowings, probably during the Srivijaya period, the borrowings from Arabic and Persian, especially during the time of the establishment of Islam, and words borrowed from Dutch during the colonial period. Linguistic history and cultural history are clearly linked.

- Early Hindu and Buddhist influence from India results in many Sanskrit words in Indonesian (and especially adopted through Javanese influence). Indian traders may have contributed words as well, in Tamil and Sanskrit-related languages.
- Indonesian has evolved through trade with China since ancient times, including through significant numbers of Chinese immigrants migrating to Indonesia. As a result, some of the Chinese language, especially the Hokkien dialect, has been incorporated into Indonesian.
- Muslim influence, originally through Arabic and Persian traders over a number of centuries, resulted in an extensive influence from the Arabic and Persian.
- Portuguese contact, trade and colonization in the 16th century was the first contact between Indonesia and European culture, and had an influence that remains today, in spite of the relatively short time period of that influence.
- Dutch colonization and administration, lasting from the 17th century to the 20th, extensively affected the vocabulary. As Dutch-trained linguists determined the rules for the official Indonesian language, Dutch thus affected the structure of the language as well. For example, suffixes such as "-asi" (e.g., administrasi = administrative) and "-if" (e.g., fiktif = fictief) were applied with consistency. Some loan words are still intensively used today, although Indonesian equivalents exist.
- Modern Indonesian regularly adopts new words from other languages, particularly English. In contrast to the large number of mechanical terms borrowed from Dutch (e.g., automotive parts), hi-tech words are typically taken from English (e.g., internet) and some informal greetings such as hai, he (probably from Javanese), yo, etc.

But the processes may also be ‘out of period’; for example, Indonesian words are still being concocted from Sanskrit, and the influence of the Dutch language certainly continued after the Dutch themselves left.

Indonesian has also generalized brand names into common (lower-case) nouns as generic name. For example, "sanyo" refers to any electrical well pump, regardless of manufacturer, "odol" as all of toothpastes, or “aqua” for mineral water. This is similar to the type of generalization that occurs in English words like "xerox" or "tampax" or "polaroid".

== List of loanwords ==
=== From Austronesian languages ===
==== From Minangkabau ====
Most of Indonesian's vocabulary is natively derived from Malay, as Indonesian is after all a standardized form of Malay, but some might ultimately be loanwords from the Minang language. Yet it is unclear, since Malay and Minang are closely related, and some might consider Minang to have been descended from a dialect of Malay due to sheer similarity.

Word	Meaning	Original word
baruh	lowland	baruah
buyung	sonny	buyuang
cakak	fight	cakak
campin	skilled	campin
cegak	vigorous	cegak
cemeeh	jeer	cemeeh
dadih	buttermilk	dadiah
dendang	sing	dendang
gadang	large	gadang
gaek	aged	gaek
jerang	boiled	jarang
kelok	meanders	kelok
nan	which, who, that (connecting word)	nan
ngarai	canyon	ngarai
nian	very, really, truly	nian
rancak	beautiful	rancak
rantau	foreign country	rantau
rendang	rendang	randang

==== From Javanese ====
Compared to the Malay language spoken as the native regional language in Sumatra and the Malay peninsula or the standardized version of Malaysian, Indonesian differs profoundly by the large number of Javanese loanwords incorporated into their already rich vocabulary. This is mostly contributed by Java's position as the center of Indonesian politics, education, and culture, since the capital is located in Jakarta on Java island, albeit in the area where the Javanese are not the majority. The disproportionate number of Javanese that dominate Indonesian politics is reflected by the fact that all of eight Indonesian presidents have been ethnic Javanese or half Javanese (Habibi and Prabowo, both are half Gorontalo and Minahasa respectively).

The result is that the Javanese began to shape their own vocabulary into Indonesian to describes terms and words that do not have exact counterparts in the Malay language. It is also important to note that most of Indonesian's Sanskrit loanwords have been transmitted through Old Javanese, a language whose Sanskrit borrowings number almost 50% of the total vocabulary. Javanese loanwords, unlike those from other native languages, have entered the basic vocabulary of Indonesian to such an extent that, for many, they are no longer perceived to be foreign.

Indonesian Word	Meaning	Javanese Word
Adem	cool temperature	ꦄꦝꦼꦩ꧀ (adhem)
Adiluhung/adiluhur	1. refined, 2. highly sophisticated taste	ꦄꦢꦶꦭꦸꦥꦸꦁ (adiluhung)
Alun-alun	a large field owned by an area	ꦄꦭꦸꦤ꧀ꦄꦭꦸꦤ꧀ (alun-alun)
Amblas	vanish	ꦄꦩ꧀ꦧ꧀ꦔꦱ꧀ (ambles)
Ambruk	collapse	ꦄꦩ꧀ꦧꦿꦸꦏ꧀ (ambruk)
Amis	fishy	ꦄꦩꦶꦱ꧀ (amis)
Among	nurture	ꦄꦩꦺꦴꦁ (among)
Ampuh	potent	ꦄꦩ꧀ꦥꦸꦃ (ampuh)
Anggun	graceful	ꦄꦁꦒꦸꦤ꧀ (anggun)
Angker	haunted	ꦄꦁꦏꦼꦂ (angker)
Anjlok	dropped	ꦄꦤ꧀ꦗ꧀ꦭꦺꦴꦒ꧀ (anjlog)
Antek	stooge	ꦄꦤ꧀ꦠꦺꦏ꧀ (antek)
Anyar	new	ꦄꦚꦂ (anyar)
Apik	neat, nice	ꦄꦥꦶꦏ꧀ (apik)
Asri	beautiful (scenery/nature), neat, clean, nice	ꦄꦱꦿꦶ (asri)
awet	durable	ꦄꦮꦺꦠ꧀ (awet)
Ayu	beautiful (women), pretty, gorgeous, graceful, elegant	ꦄꦪꦸ (ayu)
Ayom	1. give shade, 2. foster, 3. protect	ꦄꦪꦺꦴꦩ꧀꧈ ꦲꦔꦪꦺꦴꦩꦶ (ayom, hangayomi)
bablas	1. continue, 2. disappear	ꦧꦧ꧀ꦭꦱ꧀ (bablas)
Baluwarti	palace fortified wall	ꦧꦭꦸꦮꦼꦂꦠꦶ (baluwerti) ^{[1]}
Bangsal	hall	ꦧꦁꦱꦭ꧀ (Bangsal) ^{[2]}
Batik	batik	ꦩ꧀ꦧꦛꦶꦏ꧀ (mbathik) ^{[3]}
bebek	duck	ꦧꦺꦧꦺꦏ꧀ (bebek)
bebet	social status of prospective life partner	ꦧꦼꦧꦼꦠ꧀ (bebet)
becek	puddle	ꦧꦺꦕꦺꦏ꧀ (becek)
bejat	depraved, broken	ꦧꦼꦗꦠ꧀ (bejat)
belek	a disease that causes red, watery eyes and a lot of eye discharge, eye discharge	ꦧꦼꦭꦺꦏ꧀ (belek)
beres	completed	ꦧꦺꦫꦺꦱ꧀ (beres)
besek	a place or container made of woven bamboo with a rectangular lid for storing food	ꦧꦺꦱꦺꦏ꧀ (besek)
betot	pull suddenly	ꦧꦼꦠꦺꦴꦠ꧀ (betot)
bobot	weight	ꦧꦺꦴꦧꦺꦴꦠ(bobot)
bopong	carry	ꦧꦺꦴꦥꦺꦴꦁ (bopong)
berandal	thugs	ꦧꦿꦤ꧀ꦢꦭꦤ꧀ (brandalan)
bromocorah	criminal	ꦧꦿꦩꦕꦺꦴꦫꦃ (bromocorah)
Buron/buronan	runaway or fugitive	ꦧꦸꦫꦺꦴꦤ꧀ (buron) ^{[4]}
candi	temple	ꦕꦤ꧀ꦝꦶ (candhi)
canggih	sophisticated	ꦕꦁꦒꦶꦃ (canggih)
cebol	midget, very short	ꦕꦺꦧꦺꦴꦭ꧀ (cebol)
celingukan	look around	ꦕꦼꦭꦶꦁꦏꦸꦔꦤ꧀ (celingukan)
ceplas ceplos	speak out frankly	ꦕꦼꦥ꧀ꦭꦱ꧀ꦕꦼꦥ꧀ꦭꦺꦴꦱ꧀ (ceplas ceplos)
copet	pickpocket	ꦕꦺꦴꦥꦺꦠ꧀ (copet)
dalang	1. person who plays puppets, 2. a person who organizes (plans, leads) a movement secretly	ꦣꦭꦁ (dhalang)
dengkul	knee	ꦢꦼꦁꦏꦸꦭ꧀ (dengkul)
doyan	be fond, really like	ꦢꦺꦴꦪꦤ꧀ (doyan)
edan	crazy, insane	ꦌꦝꦤ꧀ (edhan)
empu	maestro, master craftsman	ꦩ꧀ꦥꦸ (mpu)
enak	nice, tasty, yummy	ꦌꦤꦏ꧀ (enak)
gampang	easy	ꦒꦩ꧀ꦥꦁ (gampang)
ganteng	beautiful and dashing, handsome, good looking	ꦔ꧀ꦒꦤ꧀ꦠꦼꦁ (ngganteng)
gawai	1. work or tools, 2. small electronics with practical functions	ꦒꦮꦺ (gawe)
gebrakan	1. blow, 2. a brave act that was not anticipated beforehand	ꦒꦼꦧꦿꦏꦤ꧀ (gebrakan)
gede	big, large	ꦒꦼꦢꦺ (gede)
gelandangan	1. homeless, 2. a person whose residence and work are uncertain	ꦒꦼꦭꦤ꧀ꦝꦁ (gelandang)
gembok	padlock	ꦒꦼꦩ꧀ꦧꦺꦴꦏ꧀ (gembok)
gendong	piggyback	ꦒꦼꦤ꧀ꦝꦺꦴꦁ (gendong)
gerebek	raid	ꦒꦿꦼꦧꦼꦒ꧀ (grebeg) ^{[5]}
gilas	crush, to crush while rolling, running over	ꦒꦶꦭꦼꦱ꧀ (giles)
gosong	scorched, burnt	ꦒꦺꦴꦱꦺꦴꦁ (gosong)
gurih	delicious	ꦒꦸꦫꦶꦃ (gurih)
irit	frugal	ꦆꦫꦶꦠ꧀ (irit)
jagal	butcher	ꦗꦒꦭ꧀ (jagal)
jago, jagoan	tough guy, hero, skillful, expert	ꦗꦒꦺꦴ (jago) ^{[6]}
jajan	snack	ꦗꦗꦤ꧀ (jajan)
joget	dance	ꦗꦺꦴꦒꦺꦠ꧀ (joget)
kakek	grandpa, grandfather	ꦏꦏꦺꦏ꧀ (kakek)
kayak or kaya	such as, as, like	ꦏꦪꦏ꧀ (kayak)
kebinekaan	diversity	ꦏꦼꦧꦶꦤꦺꦏꦄꦤ꧀ (kebinekaan)
kedut	twitching	ꦏꦼꦝꦸꦠꦤ꧀ (kedhutan)
kemben	torso wrap	ꦏꦼꦩ꧀ꦧ꧀ꦲꦺꦤ꧀ (kembhen)
kesurupan	possessed	ꦱꦸꦫꦸꦥ꧀ (surup) ^{[7]}
ketimbang	compared to, rather than	ꦠꦶꦤꦶꦩ꧀ꦧꦁ (tinimbang)
kolot	not modern, old, ancient	ꦏꦺꦴꦭꦺꦴꦠ꧀ (kolot)
konde	bulbous hairdo or hair extension on the back of the head	ꦏꦺꦴꦤ꧀ꦝꦺ (kondhe)
kualat or kuwalat	1. suffer a disaster, 2. plague, 3. be cursed	ꦏꦸꦮꦭꦠ꧀ (kuwalat)
lalap or lalab	young leaves, cucumber, raw petai eaten together with chili sauce and rice	ꦭꦭꦥ꧀ (lalap)
langka	rare	ꦭꦁꦏ (langka)
lara	sadness (poetic), sick	ꦭꦫ (lara) ^{[8]}
larung	intentionally swept or send away through water (river/sea)	ꦭꦫꦸꦁ (larung)
lapik	base	ꦭꦥꦶꦏ꧀ (lapik)
lengser	demotion, no longer in office	ꦭꦺꦁꦱꦺꦂ (lengser)
luhur	noble, high	ꦭꦸꦲꦸꦂ (luhur)
manut	obedient	ꦩꦤꦸꦠ꧀ (manut)
mantu	son in law, marrying off a child	ꦩꦤ꧀ꦠꦸ (mantu)
maling	thief, to steal	ꦩꦭꦶꦁ (maling)
melek	not sleeping, guard, awake	ꦩꦼꦭꦺꦏ꧀(melek)
melengos	looked away	ꦩꦼꦊꦔꦺꦴꦱ꧀ (melengos)
mewek	cry	ꦩꦺꦮꦺꦏ꧀ (mewek)
minggat	flee, escape	ꦩꦶꦁꦒꦠ꧀ (minggat)
mingkem	keep quiet	ꦩꦶꦁꦏꦼꦩ꧀ (mingkem)
mumpung	while, by chance	ꦩꦸꦩ꧀ꦥꦸꦁ (mumpung)
mumpuni	accomplished, competent	ꦩꦸꦩ꧀ꦥꦸꦤꦶ (mumpuni)
nganggur	idle, jobless	ꦔꦁꦒꦸꦂ (nganggur)
nusantara	Indonesian archipelago, archipelago	ꦤꦸꦱꦤ꧀ꦠꦫ (nusantara)
pagar langkan	balustrade	ꦭꦂꦒ ꦭꦁꦏꦤ꧀ (pagar langkan)
pamrih	intention	ꦥꦩꦿꦶꦃ (pamrih)
pantas	proper, appropriate, worthy	ꦥꦤ꧀ꦠꦼꦱ꧀ (pantes)
patungan	1. joint venture, 2. joint purchase, 3. rent	ꦥꦠꦸꦁ (patung)
pemirsa	viewers	ꦥꦼꦩꦶꦂꦱ (pemirsa)
pemulung	scavenger, waste picker	ꦥꦸꦭꦸꦁ (pulung)
Pendopo	roofed front open hall	ꦥꦼꦤ꧀ꦝꦺꦴꦥꦺꦴ (pendhopo) ^{[9]}
pepes	a side dish made from spiced fish and wrapped in banana leaves	ꦥꦺꦥꦺꦱ꧀ (pepes)
pilek	flu, rhinorrhea	ꦥꦶꦭꦼꦏ (pilek)
pundak	shoulder	ꦥꦸꦤ꧀ꦢꦏ꧀ (puņḍak)
rampung	finished, done	ꦫꦩ꧀ꦥꦸꦁ (rampung)
resik	clean, well maintained	ꦉꦱꦶꦏ꧀ (resik)
sedap or sedep	savory, good	ꦱꦼꦣꦼꦥ꧀ (sedhep)
sedot	suck	ꦱꦼꦢꦺꦴꦠ꧀ (sedot)
selaras	harmonious	ꦱ꧀ꦭꦫꦱ꧀(slaras)
selingkuh	affair	ꦱꦼꦭꦶꦁꦏꦸꦃ (selingkuh)
semberono	careless, reckless	ꦱꦼꦩ꧀ꦧꦿꦺꦴꦤꦺꦴ (sembrono)
semrawut	1. complicated mess, 2. out of order	ꦱꦼꦩꦿꦮꦸꦠ꧀ (semrawut)
sungkan	shy	ꦱꦸꦁꦏꦤ꧀ (sungkan)
tata krama	1. manners, 2. small talk	ꦠꦠꦏꦿꦩ (tata krama)
tembang	song	ꦠꦼꦩ꧀ꦧꦁ (tembang)
tentram	peaceful	ꦠꦼꦤ꧀ꦠꦿꦼꦩ꧀ (tentrem)
titisan	reincarnated	ꦤꦶꦠꦶꦱ꧀ (nitis)
tuntas	complete	ꦠꦸꦤ꧀ꦠꦱ꧀ (tuntas)
undakan	stages	ꦈꦤ꧀ꦝꦏ꧀ (undhak)
unduh	download	ꦈꦤ꧀ꦢꦸꦃ (unduh)
unggah	upload	ꦩꦸꦁꦒꦃ (munggah)
umpak	base	ꦈꦩ꧀ꦥꦏ꧀ (umpak)
uwa or uwak	a term of address for an older sibling from one's father or mother	ꦈꦮ (uwa)
Notes^1Ultimately from Spanish 'baluarte' via Filipino languages.^2Ultimately from Sanskrit: शाल (Śālā) meaning room.^3From Amba-nitik^4From Buron-an (to be hunted)^5A routine celebration held by the people of Java to commemorate an important event.^6A Rooster^7Fit, Enter^8Sick^9Ultimately from Sanskrit: मण्डप (mandapa)

==== From Sundanese ====
Besides Javanese, Sundanese is another local language that has influenced Indonesian's vocabulary, albeit to a lesser extent. This can be attributed to the fact that the capital, Jakarta, was formerly a part of West Java, a province which, together with Banten, before it too was divided, constituted the Pasundan (Sundanese world), the most significant non-Javanese region in an otherwise Javanese-dominated Java island. Some of the most populous cities in Indonesia are also located in the Pasundan, including West Java's capital, Bandung, and Jakarta's four satellite cities (Bekasi, Bogor, Depok, and Tangerang).

Word	Meaning	Original word
Aci	tapioca flour	ᮃᮎᮤ ᮞᮙ᮪ᮕᮩ (aci sampeu)
Amburadul	mess, something out of order	ᮃᮙ᮪ᮘᮥᮛᮓᮥᮜ᮪ (amburadul)
Anjangsana	high official visiting	ᮃᮔ᮪ᮏᮀᮞᮔ (anjangsana)
Berabe	annoying, nuisance	ᮘᮛᮘᮨ (barabe)
Bloon (pronounced blo-'on)	stupid	ᮘᮣᮧ'ᮇᮔ᮪ (blo'on/o'on)
Cocopet	earwig	ᮎᮧᮎᮧᮕᮨᮒ᮪ (cocopet)
Getol	active	ᮌᮨᮒᮧᮜ᮪ (getol)
Hatur	to express, to send (polite)	ᮠᮒᮥᮁᮊᮩᮔ᮪ (haturkeun)
Jangkung	tall	ᮏᮀᮊᮥᮀ (jangkung)
Juara	champion, winner	ᮏᮝᮛ (jawara)
Kedap	proof as in "kedap air" (waterproof)	ᮊᮨᮓᮕ᮪ (kedap)
Kesima	awe, amaze	ᮊᮨᮞᮤᮙ (kesima)
Kesohor	famous	ᮊᮞᮧᮠᮧᮁ (kasohor)
Mending	better	ᮙᮨᮔ᮪ᮓᮤᮀ (mending)
Pengaruh	influence	ᮕᮍᮛᮥᮂ (pangaruh)
Risih	uneasy, uncomfortable	ᮛᮤᮞ᮪ᮂ (rish)
Songong	no self-awareness, arrogant or proud, ignorant of customs	ᮞᮧᮍᮧᮀ (songong)

==== From Betawi ====
Betawi is a Malay-based creole that arose from influences by foreign traders who stopped at the capital, Jakarta, including those from China and Arabia. Most of its speakers are inhabitants of Jakarta, and its influence upon Indonesian is attributed to its frequent usage in Indonesian mass media, including radio and television. Its status as a "hip" language by other portions of Indonesian society is another contributing factor as well.

Word	Meaning	Original word
abal-abal	fake, false	abal-abal
bangkotan	aged	bangkotan
begah	replete	begah
belagu	ostentatious	belagu
biasanye	usually	biasanye
bonyok	bruise	bonyok
butut	old-fashioned	butut
cebur	splash	cebur
centong	a spoon with a handle	centong
engkong	grandfather	engkong
entot	copulate	entot
mak	mother	mak
mampus	dead	mampus
ngelunjak	brash, be rude	ngelunjak
ngamen	street performance	ngamen
nyeloncong	god damn it	nyeloncong
nyelonong	suddenly enter or come, present without greeting first	nyelonong
plesiran	traveling, vacation	plesiran
rempong	troublesome	rempong
rengking	ranking	rengking
ribet	complicated, hard, not easy	ribet
rombeng	rags, selling used goods, old things, junk	rombeng
ringkesin	tidy up	ringkesin
timpuk	throw	timpuk
udak	chase	udak

==== From Nias ====
Indonesian word	Indonesian meaning	Nias word	Nias meaning	Note
mado	Nias' clan system	mado		

==== From Batak ====
Word	Meaning	Original word
ampun	sorry	ᯔᯬᯞᯧᯂ(ampun)
gumul	wrestle	ᯔᯬᯞᯧᯂ᯲ᯞ(gumul)
molek	voluptuous	ᯔᯬᯞᯧᯂ᯲(molek)
selok	possessed	ᯔᯬᯞᯧᯂ᯲(selok)
palum	quenched thirst	ᯇᯞᯮᯔ᯲ (palum)

==== From Palembang ====
Word	Meaning	Original word
budak	slave	budak
belagak	handsome	belagak
pergi	go	pegi
palak	irritated, feeling hateful, annoyed	palak
santai	carelessly, not seriously, relax, calm	santai

==== From Ambonese ====
Word	Meaning	Original word
beta	I, me, first person	beta

==== From Balinese ====
Balinese, or simply Bali, is a Malayo-Polynesian language spoken by 3.3 million people (as of 2000) on the Indonesian island of Bali as well as northern Nusa Penida, western Lombok and eastern Java.

Indonesian word	Indonesian meaning	Balinese word
Arja	a popular form of Balinese theatre which combines elements of opera, dance, and drama.	ᬅᬃᬚ (Arja)
Awatara ^{[1]}	An incarnation of god, or its manifestation	ᬅᬯᬢᬭ (Awatara)
Awig-Awig	balinese customary law	ᬅᬯᬶᬕ᭄ᬳᬯᬶᬕ᭄ (Awig-Awig)
Bade	a corpse stretcher tower used in Ngaben	ᬩᬤᬾ (Badé)
Bandrang	a spear decorated with the hairs of animals	ᬩᬦ᭄ᬤ᭄ᬭᬂ (Bandrang)
Bangkung	a female sow	ᬩᬗ᭄ᬓᬸᬂ (Bangkung)
Banjar	a community organisation a level below villages	ᬩᬜ᭄ᬚᬃ (Banjar)
Banten	an offering/tribute	ᬩᬦ᭄ᬢᭂᬦ᭄ (Bantên)
Barong	a creature from Javanese and Balinese mythology	ᬩᬭᭀᬂ (Barong)
Bebali	semi sacred Balinese dances	ᬩᭂᬩᬮᬶ (Bêbali)
Bebangkit	an offering to the Hindu Goddess Durga in the form of cakes and fruit	ᬩᭂᬩᬂᬓᬶᬢ᭄ (Bêbangkit)
Bebekel	properties brought by husband or wife before marriage	ᬩᭂᬩᭂᬓᭂᬮ᭄ (Bêbêkêl)
Bendesa	the ruler of a village	ᬩᭂᬦ᭄ᬤᬾᬰ (Bêndésa)
Caturjalma	the four castes of society	ᬘᬢᬸᬃᬚᬮ᭄ᬫ (Caturjalma)
Cokorda	ruler of a local kingdom	ᬘᭀᬓᭀᬃᬤ (Cokorda)
Dewa	a deity or god	ᬤᬾᬯ (Déwa)
Notes^1A loanword from Sanskrit, अवतार.

=== From Indian languages ===
==== From Sanskrit ====
Although Hinduism and Buddhism are no longer the major religions of Indonesia, Sanskrit, the language vehicle for these religions, is still held in high esteem, and its status is comparable with that of Latin in English and other Western Indo-European languages. The main reason is that Indian Muslims left big legacy in Southeast Asia. Sanskrit is also the main source for neologisms; these are usually formed from Sanskrit roots. For example, the name of Jayapura city (former Hollandia) and Jayawijaya Mountains (former Orange Range) in the Indonesian province of Papua were coined in the 1960s; both are Sanskrit origin name to replace its Dutch colonial names. Some Indonesian contemporary medals of honor and awards, such as Bintang Mahaputra medal, Kalpataru award and Adipura award, are also Sanskrit derived names.

The loanwords from Sanskrit cover many aspects of religion, art and everyday life. The Sanskrit influence on Indonesia came from contacts with India long ago before the 1st century. The words are either directly borrowed from India or through the intermediary of the Old Javanese language. In the classical language of Java, Old Javanese, the number of Sanskrit loanwords is far greater. The Old Javanese — English dictionary by Prof. P.J. Zoetmulder, S.J. (1982) contains no fewer than 25,500 entries. Almost half are Sanskrit loanwords. Sanskrit loanwords, unlike those from other languages except Arabic and Persian, have entered the basic vocabulary of Indonesian to such an extent that, for many, they are no longer perceived to be foreign.

==== From Pali ====
Pali (Pāli) is a Prakrit language and belongs to the Indo-European language family together with Sanskrit. As Sanskrit is the language vehicle of Hinduism, Pali is the language vehicle for Buddhism, especially the Theravada tradition which is mainly adhered to by Buddhists within Indosphere Southeast Asia. Virtually every word in Pāḷi has cognates in the other Middle Indo-Aryan languages, the Prakrits. The relationship to Vedic Sanskrit is less direct and more complicated; the Prakrits were descended from Old Indo-Aryan vernaculars.

Indonesian word	Indonesian meaning	Pali word	Pali transcription	Pali meaning	Note
belanja	shopping, expense	वलञ्ज	valañja	that which is spent or secreted	
biku	bhikkhu (classical)	भिक्खु	bhikkhu	beggar, bhikkhu	see also biksu from Sanskrit.
bikuni	bhikkhuni (classical)	भिक्खुणी	bhikkhuṇī	beggar, bhikkhuni	see also biksuni from Sanskrit.
dana	allocated money	धन	dhana	treasure	
dana	donation, funds	दान	dāna	giving, liberality; offering, alms	cognate of Sanskrit दान (dāna).
duka	sadness, grief	दुक्ख	dukkha	stress; suffering; pain; distress; discontent	
loba	greed	लोभ	lobha	greed; passion; unskillful desire.	
mara	calamity	मार	māra	mara (demon)	cognate of Sanskrit मार (māra).
merana	sick, sadness	मारण	māraṇa	killing, slaughter, murder	cognate of Sanskrit मारण (māraṇa).
percaya	believe	परिचय	paricaya	familiarity	cognate of Sanskrit प्रत्ययः (pratyayaḥ)
raga	(physical) body	राग	rāga	lust; greed	

==== From Hindi ====
Hindi (Devanagari: हिन्दी, IAST: Hindī) is a standardised and Sanskritised register of the Hindustani language. Hindi is an Indo-European, and specifically an Indo-Aryan language. It is descended from Sanskrit and is considered part of the Central Indo-Aryan subgroup.

Indonesian word	Indonesian meaning	Hindi word	Hindi transcription	Hindi meaning	Note
acar	pickles	अचार	achaar	pickles	
antari	cloth	अंतरीय	antarīya	under garment	
gari, argari	handcuffs	हाथकड़ी	hath-kaṛī	hand+link	
ayah	father	आया	āyā	ayah, nanny	
bahadur	brave	बहादुर	bahādur	brave	from Persian بهادر (bahâdor)
bahana	1. loud sound (n.), 2. great, bright (adj.)	भनक	bhanak	a low or distant sound, hum, buzz, ring	
bahana	1. loud sound (n.), 2. great, bright (adj.)	हनना	hannā	to speak, to break silence	
bakdul	rein	बागडोर	bāgḍor	rein	
banglo	perforated crates to keep the fish in the dam area		banglā		
bangsal	ward, shed, public building	भनसाल	bhansāl	storehouse, magazine, granary	see भण्डसाल (bhanḍsāl) < भण्डसार (bhaṇḍasāra) storehouse, magazine, granary
barua	procuress		bhaṛuā		
basi	stale, spoilt	बासी	bāsī	stale, rancid	
bel	bell		bel		
belati	dagger	विलायती	vilāyatī	foreign	
bendahari, bendari	female treasurer	भंडारी	bhaṇḍārī	store keeper	
benian		बनियान	baniyān	under garment, vest	
beta	I (first-person pronoun) (classical, Moluccas)	बेटा	beṭā	son	
bêti	proof		beṭī		
bibi	aunt		bī		
cacar	pox (disease)	चेचक	cecak	pox (disease)	
cakela	brothel, whorehouse (archaic)	चकला	caklā	brothel, whorehouse	
candu	opium	चण्डू	caṇḍū	opium	from Sanskrit चण्ड+उकः
cap	stamp	? छापा	chāp ṭhappā	? stamp	
capal	leather sandal	चप्पल	cappal	slipper	
celana	pants, trousers	चोलना	ćolnā	short breeches, reaching half-way down the thighs	
cempa			campā		
ceri	cherry (Muntingia calabura)		curī		
ceteri	tent (in boat) (arch.)	छत्री	ćhatrī	covering, canopy	Sanskrit tadbhava word छत्रिका
cindai	flowery silk		cunrī		
coli	(arch.)		colī		
culim	smoking pipe	चिलम	cilam	smoking pipe	see also chillum
cura	funny		churā		
curi	steal	चूरी चोरी	ćūrī corī	steal	
cuti	leave	छुट्टी	chuṭṭī	leave	
dal	bean	दाल	dāl	dried, split pulses	see dal.
dam	check (pattern)	दाम	dām	net, snare	
dandi	a kind of musical instrument	डोंडी	ḍoṅḍī	small kettle-drum	Sanskrit tadbahva दुन्दुभी
dera	lash		durrā	to whip	
dian	small lamp	दिया	dīyā	light, lamp, lantern	
dobi	laundry worker	धोबी	dhobī	laundry worker (male)	
dol	1. Indian drum, 2. mast	ढोल	ḍhol	dhol	
dol	1. Indian drum, 2. mast	डोल	ḍol	mast	probably from Arabic دلو (dalw)
duhai	an interjection word	दुहाई	duhāī	cry for help	
duli	dust; foot; honorary word for official, nobility, or king	डोली	ḍolī	a kind of sedan	see also paduka.
dura	far	दूर	dūr	far	
gajus	cashew (Anacardium occidentale)	दूर	kājū	cashew (Anacardium occidentale)	possibly from Tupian acajú through Portuguese caju
gala-gala	small bee		gūgal		
ganda	small bee		gāna		
ganja	Cannabis sativa	गांझा	gāṅjhā	Cannabis sativa	probably from Sanskrit गृञ्ज+कः, or गृञ्जनकः
gap	1. sound of slapping on a table.; 2 sound of heartbeat.		gap	the sound made by a blow, or in swallowing	
garam	salt	गरम	garam	hot, warm	
geleca	cake (arch.)		gālīcā		
guli	marbles	गोली	golī	ball	from Sanskrit गोल+इका
gusar	angry		g̠uṣṣa	choking, anger	from Arabic غصة, from. غصّ 'to be choked'

==== From Tamil ====
Loanwords from Tamil, while also an Indian language (though not Indo-European like Sanskrit), mainly exist in cuisine, like Chinese and unlike Sanskrit. It is a Dravidian language and not an Indo-Aryan language. However, Hinduism had great impact in Tamil, there are several Indo-Aryan loanwords in Tamil and they are possibility to list them in Indo-Aryan loanwords, such as Sanskrit.

Interaction between Tamil speakers and Malay speakers has been established from ancient time. Tamil influence has been around such as Palava usage as ancient script in Indonesia (Palava dynasty was existed on 275 CE–897 CE) and Chola invasion of Srivijaya in 1025. It mainly entered the lexicon of Malay (and by extension, Indonesian) with the immigration of South Indian traders who settled around the Strait of Malacca.

Indonesian Word	Indonesian Meaning	Tamil Word	Tamil Transliteration	Tamil Meaning	Note
acaram	1. ring, 2. earnest money	அச்சகாரம்	accāram	earnest money	
acu	mould, model	அச்சு	accu	mould	
andai	if, suppose	அண்டை	aṇṭai	near, support	
apam	kind of cake	அப்பம்	appam	appam, rice cake, bread pastry	
badai	storm	வாடை	vāṭai	wind, north wind	
bagai	sort of	வகை	vakai	kind, sort	
baji	wedge	வசி	vaci	cleft, point, edge	
basi	1. commission, fee 2. overtime or extra pay 3. reduction (in price), discount	வாசி	vāci	1. difference 2. rate, as of interest; portion 3. discount, in changing money	
batil	copper bowl, plate, tray	வட்டில்	vaṭṭil	a brass tray, a platter; basket	
bedil	gun, rifle	வெடி	veṭi	explosion, as of gun	via Javanese bedhil
bicu	lever	வீச்சு	vīccu	blow, stroke	
biram	1. elephant, 2. double-headed snake, 3. red	வேழம்	vēḻam	elephant	
canai	grindstone	சாணை	cāṇai-k-kal	grindstone	
cemeti	whip	சம்மட்டி	cammaṭṭi	1. (horse-)whip, 2. large hammer	
cerpelai	mongoose (Herpestes sp.)	கீரிப்பிள்ளை	kīri-p-piḷḷai	common Indian mungoose, Indian ichneumon, Herpestes mungo	
cerpu	leather sandals (terompah-like)	செருப்பு	ceruppu	leather sandals, slippers, shoes	
cerutu, serutu	cigar	சுருட்டு	curuṭṭu	1. curling, coiling; 2. cigar	
ceti	money lender	செட்டி	ceṭṭi	mercantile caste, traders	from Prakrit sēṭṭišrēṣṭhin
cukai	excise tax, custom	சுங்கம்	cuṅkam	duty on goods, customs, tolls	from Prakrit šuṅkašulka
cuku	dried gambier roots	சுக்கு	cukku	dried ginger	
cuma	only, no others	சும்மா	cummā	leisurely, without any occupation or work	?
gula	sugar	குளம்	kuḷam	sugar	*?
gulai	kind of curry	குலை	gulai		*?
gundu	marbles	குண்டு	kuṇṭu	ball; anything globular and heavy	
gurindam	two lines rhyme	கிரந்தம்	kirantam	1. book, treatise 2. A verse or prose containing 32 syllables, šlōka	from grantha.
helai	sheet	இலை	ilai	leaf, petal	
jodoh, joli	mate, partner	சோடி	cōṭi	couple, pair	loanword from Hind. jōḍi.
joli	royal sedan	டோலி	ṭōli	a kind of sedan	loanword from Hind. ḍōlā.
kambi	wooden frames to strengthen the edges of doors	கம்பி	kampi	wall plate	
kapal	boat	கப்பல்	kappal	ship, sailing vessel	
kari, kare	curry	கறி	kaṟi	curry	
katai, katik	small, short	கடை	kaṭṭai	short, low, dwarfish defect, deficiency	
katelum	bastion	கொத்தளம்	kottalam	part of a rampart, bastion, defensive erection on the top of a rampart	from Pāli koṭṭhaka
kati	a measure of weight = 6¼ ons	கட்டி	kaṭṭi	a measure of weight = 25 palams	
katik	1. Paspalum scrobiculatum, 2. Treron curvirostra, 3. area measurement (of land or field)	கட்டை	kaṭṭai	mile	
katil	bed	கட்டில்	kaṭṭil	1. cot, bedstead, couch, sofa, 2. Throne	
kawal	guard, escourt	காவல்	kāval	defence, protection, watchman, guard	
kedai	foodstall	கடை	kaṭai	bazaar, shop, market	
kedelai	Glycine max	கடலை	kaṭalai	Cicer arietinum, Melastoma malabaricum	Kanarese, Travancore usage kaḍale, Malayalam kaḍala
keledai	Equus asinus	கழுதை	kaḻutai	Equus asinus	
ketumbar	Coriandrum sativum	கொத்தமல்லி	kottamalli	Coriandrum sativum	from Sanskrit कुस्तुम्बुरु (kustumburu)
kodi	twenty units	கோடி	kōṭi	1. Crore, ten millions, 2. large number	
kolam	pool, pond, basin, tank	குளம்	kuḷam	tank, pond, reservoir, lake	
konde, kundai	dressing of hair in large coil on the head	கொண்டை	koṇṭai	tuft, dressing of hair in large coil on the head	related to Telugu koṇḍe, Kanarese Travancore goṇḍe, Malayalam koṇṭa
korundum	natural Aluminum oxide	குருந்தம்	kuruntam	corundum, emery	
kudai	basket made of rattan	கூடை	kūṭai	basket made of rattan, ola or bamboo	
kuil	temple	கோயில்	kōyil	1. Palace, 2. Temple, Sanctuary	
kulai	limp	குலை	kulai	to untie, loosen, dishevel	
kuli	physical worker	கூலி	kūli	1. wages, pay; 2. fare, hire, freight	
kundi	clay craftsman		kuṉṟi		?
ladam	horseshoe	லாடம்	lāṭam	horseshoe	
lebai	mosque employees	லப்பை	lappai	Tamil-speaking Muhammadans	
logam	metal	உலோகம்	ulōkam	metal	from lōha metal
madali	a musical instrument	மத்தளம்	mattaḷam	a kind of drum	
malai	strands	மாலை	mālai	anything strung together	
maligai	royal chamber in palace	மாளிகை	māḷikai	top floor of a storied building	?
mangga	mango	மாங்காய்	māṅkāy	mango	
manik	beads		maṇi		
manikam	diamond	மாணிக்கம்	māṇikkam	gem, precious stone	
merikan, marikan	clothes from America	மரிக்கன்	marikkaṉ	from America	
maru	disturbing ghost	மாற்று	māṟṟu	to change, alter to conceal, hide to shift; to transfer, as from a place	
matu	grade of gold	மாற்று	māṟṟu	degree of fineness of gold or silver	
mempelam	mango	மாம்பழம்	mā-m-paḻam	mango fruit	
merunggai	Moringa oleifera	முருங்கை	muruṅkai	Moringa pterygosperma	
metai	bed	மெத்தை	mettai	bed, cushion	
meterai	seal, stamp	முத்திரை	muttirai	1. impress, mark 2. seal, signet 3. stamp, as for postage, for court fees	
misai	mustache	மீசை	mīcai	1. upper part, 2. cf. šmašru. moustache	
modal	capital, stock	முதல்	mutal	1. beginning 2. principal, fund, capital, money yielding interest 3. stock, store	
mundam	large tub for royal bathing	முந்தை	muntai	small vessel	
mutu	1. quality, purity of gold 2. sad 3. In pinch (chess)	முட்டு	muttu	difficulty, as in passing, hindrance, obstacle, impediment	
nali	volume unit =16 gantang =1/50 koyan	நாழி	nāḻi	tubularity; tube, a measure of capacity, =8 ollocks	related to nāḍi
nelayan	fisherman	நுளையன், கரையான், வலையன், வலைஞன்	nuḷaiyaṉ, karaiyāṉ, valaiyaṉ, valaiñaṉ,	fisher(man)	
nila	indigo	நீல	nila	blue, black, common indigo, blue nelumbo	
nilai	value	நிலை	nilai	standing character, quality, temper, nature	
nilakandi	indigo (color, stone): blue vitriol	நீலகண்டன்	nīla-kaṇṭaṉ	blue vitriol	
nilam	Pycnonotus aurigaster Pogostemon cablin	நீலம்	nīlam	blue, azure or purple colour	
ondé-ondé	jian dui	உண்டை	uṇṭai	ball, globe, sphere; anything round or globular	
panai	wooden tray	பானை	pāṉai	1. large earthen pot or vessel 2. measure of capacity 3. oil measure = 4 cempu	
pancalogam	mixture of five (many) metals	பஞ்சலோகம்	pañcalōkam	1. The five kinds of metal, poṉ, irumpu, cempu, īyam, veḷḷi; 2. Amalgam of the five metals	
pandam	resin (in the grip of keris)	பண்டம்	pantam	1. substance, material, utensils.; 2. belly, body	from bhāṇḍa
pandu	guide	பந்து	pantu	relation, kinsman	from bandhu.
patam, petam	ornament, jewelry	பட்டம்	paṭṭam	plate of gold worn on the forehead, as an ornament or badge of distinction	
pawai	1. parade, procession 2. royal equipments	பவனி	pavaṉi	parade	
pelbagai	various	1. பல; 2. வகை	1. pala 2. vakai	1. many 2. division, class, manner, way, nature, goods, places, detail	
perisai	shield	பரிசை	paricai	1. shield, buckler (come from phara); 2. large umbrella, as a badge of honour	
perli	satire, mockery	புரளி	puraḷi	1. Lying, falsehood; 2. Mischief, waggishness; 3. Quarrel, wrangle, broil;	
peti	chest, box	பெட்டி	peṭṭi	chest, trunk, coffer, box	
pitam	headache, dizziness	பித்தம் பித்தம்	pittam pitta	lunacy, madness dizziness	
puadai	red carpet	பாவாடை	pāvāṭai	red carpet	
pualam	marble	பவளம்	pavaḷam	red coral	
pudi	small diamond	பொடி	poṭi	small gem	
putu	kue putu	புட்டு	puṭṭu	puttu	
ragam	various	ராகம்	(i)rākam	desire, color, redness, music	
roti	bread	ரொட்டி	roṭṭi	bread, wheaten cake	
sambal	sambal	சம்பாரம்	campāram	spicy condiments, curry stuff	1. from Sanskrit सम्बार (sambāra) 'spices'.; 2. related to sambar (சாம்பார் cāmpār)
satai, saté	satay	சதை	catai	flesh	
sedelinggam	red paint material	சாதிலிங்கம்	cātiliṅkam	cermilion, red sulphurate of mercury	
senam	calisthenics	சானம் சனம்	cāṇam caṉam	meditation (dhyāna) people, crowd, herd	
sengketa	to dispute	ஸங்கடம்	saṅkaṭam	trouble	
talam	tray without feet	தாலம்	tālam	1. eating- plate, porringer, usually of metal.; 2. Salver	
tampah	tray	தம்பா	tampā	tray	see tatak
tambi	1. younger brother (Indian); 2. helper	தம்பி	tampi	younger brother (Indian)	
tandil	overseer	தண்டல்	taṇṭal	tax-collector	
tandu	palanquin	தண்டு	taṇṭu	pole of a palanquin or other vehicle	
tembaga	copper	செம்பு	cempu	copper, gold, metal vessel	
teman	friend	தமன்	tamaṉ	friend (male)	
terusi, tursi	blue vitriol	துருசு	turucu	blue vitriol	
tirai	curtain	திரை	tirai	curtain	
tolan	friend	தோழன்	tōlan	friend (male)	
topi	hat	தொப்பி	toppi	cap	
tunai	cash	துணை	tuṇai	measure, extent, degree, quantity, number	?
Wéda	Vēdas	வேதம்	vētam	Vēdas	

=== From Middle Eastern languages ===
==== From Arabic ====
The loanwords from Arabic are mainly concerned with religion, in particular with Islam. Allah is the word for God even in Christian Bible translations. Many early Bible translators, when they came across some unusual Hebrew words or proper names, used the Arabic cognates. In the newer translations, this practice has been discontinued. They now turn to Greek names or use the original Hebrew word. For example, the name Jesus was initially translated as 'Isa, but is now spelt as Yesus.

Arabic loanwords, including those from Persian, have entered the basic vocabulary of Indonesian to the point that they are no longer perceived to be foreign.

Word	Meaning	Original word	Transcription, notes
abdi	servant	عَبْد	ʻabd
abjad	alphabet	الأبْجَدِيّة	al'abjadia
adab	civilize, proper	أَدَب	adab: manner
adat	custom	عادة	ʻāda
ahad	Sunday	الأحد	al-ahad
ajaib	magical	عجائب	ʻajāʼīb
ajal	death	أَجَل	ʻajl: fate
akad	contract, promise	عَقْد	ʻaqd
akal	reason	عَقْل	ʻaql
akhir	end	آخِر	ʼākhir
akhirat	hereafter	آخِرة	ākhira
akhlak	character, nature (of person)	أَخْلاق	akhlāq
alam	nature, realm	عالَم	ʻālam: world, earth
alami	natural	عالَميّ	ʻālamiyy
aljabar	algebra	الجَبْر	al-jabr
Aljazair	Algeria	الجزائر	
amal	alms giving, good deed	عَمَل	ʻamal: work
aman	safe, secure	أمان	ʼamān
anda	you (formal)	أَنْتَ	anta
arak	liquor	عَرَق	ʽaraq
asal	origin	أَصْل	ʼaṣl
asas	foundation, basis	أَساس	ʼasās
asasi	foundational, basic	أَساسيّ	ʼasāsiyy
asli	real, original	أَصْليّ	ʼaṣliyy
awal	beginning	أَوَّل	ʼawwal
badan	body	بَدَن	badan
bahari	maritime, naval, of the sea	بَحْريّ	baḥriyy
batin	inner self	بَطْن	baṭn: stomach
berkah, berkat	blessing	بَرَكة	baraka
daerah	district	دَائِرَة	dā'ira
daftar	list	دَفْتَر	daftar: notebook
dahsyat	awesome	دَهْشَة	dahshat: astonishment
dakwah	sermon	دَعْوة	da'wa
derajat	degree, level	دَرَجَة	daraja
doa	pray	دُعاء	du'ā
dunia	world	دُنْيا	dunyā
faedah	benefit, profit	فَائِدَة	fāida
fajar	dawn	فَجْر	fajr
fakir	poor person, pauper	فَقير	faqīr
gaib	unseen	غَائِب	ghāib
hadiah	gift, present	هدية	hadiyyah
hafal	memorize	حَفِظَ	hifz
halal	religiously lawful	حَلال	ḥalāl
hak	right	حَقّ	ḥaqq
hakikat	truth, base	حَقيقة	ḥaqīqa
hakiki	true, real	حَقيقيّ	ḥaqīqiyy
hakim	judge (in court of law)	حاكِم	ḥākim
haram	religiously unlawful	حَرام	ḥarām
harfiah	literal	حَرْفيّة	ḥarfiyya
hayati	living	حَياتيّ	ḥayātiyy
hewan	animal	حَيَوان	ḥayawān
hikmah	wisdom, deeper meaning	حِكْمة	ḥikma
hukum	law	حُكْم	ḥukm
huruf	letter (of an alphabet)	حُروف	ḥurūf
iblis	devil	إِبْلِيس	'iiblis see setan
ijazah	diploma	إجازة	ʼijāza: license
ikhlas	sincere	إخلاص	ikhlas
ikrar	pledge, declaration	إقْرار	ʼiqrār
ilmiah	scientific	عِلْميّة	ʻilmiyya
ilmu	knowledge, science	عِلْم	ʻilm
injil	gospel	إنجيل	ʾInjīl
istilah	term	إصْطلَاح	iṣṭilaḥ
istirahat	rest, break, pause, recess	اسْتِراحة	istirāḥa
izin	permission, to permit	إذْن	ʼidhn
jadwal	schedule	جَدْوَل	jadwal
jahanam	cursed, damned	جَهَنَّم	jahannam: hell
jahil	prank, practical joke	جاهِل	jāhil: ignorant, uninformed
jawab	answer	جَواب	jawāb
jenazah	corpse	جَنازة	janāza: funeral
jilbab	hijab, head covering	جلباب	jilbāb: loose coat
Jumat	Friday	الجُمْعة	al-jumʻa
kabar	news	خَبَر	khabar
kafan	white shroud (to cover the dead)	كَفَن	kafan
kafir	infidel	كافِر	kāfir
kaidah	rule	قَاعِدَة	qā'ida
Kamis	Thursday	الخَميس	al-khamīs
kamus	dictionary	قاموس	qāmūs
kera	ape	قرد	qarad
kertas	paper	قِرْطاس	qirṭās
khas	specialty	خاصّ	khāṣṣ
khawatir	worry	خواطر	khawatir: reflections
khayal	imagination, fiction	خَيَال	khayāl
khianat	betrayal, treason	خِيَانَةُ	khiāna
khitan	circumcision	خِتان	khitān
khusus	special, particular	خصوص	khuṣūṣ
kitab	religious book	كِتاب	kitāb
korban	victim	قُرْبان	qurbān: sacrifice
kuliah	college/lecture	كُلّيّة	kulliyya: faculty
kurma	date palm	كَرْمة	karma: grapevine
kursi	chair	كُرْسيّ	kursiyy
kurun	span (of time)	قُرون	qurūn: centuries
lahir	to be born; physical, external, outer	ظاهر	ẓāhir
laskar	soldier	العَسْكَر	al-ʻaskar
lezat	delicious	لذّة	ladhdha
lisan	verbally, tongue	لِسان	lisān
maaf	sorry, to apologise	معاف	muʻāf
mahkamah	court of law	مَحْكَمة	maḥkama
majelis	assembly, board, council	مَجْلِس	majlis
makam	grave	مَقَام	maqām: permanent place of s.t.
makhluk	creature	مخلوق	maẖlūq
makna	meaning	مَعْنًى	maʻnan
maksud	meaning, purpose	مَقْصود	maqsūd
maktub	written	مَكْتوب	maktūb
malaikat	angel	مَلائكة	malāʼika
masalah	problem	مَسْأَلة	masʼala
masjid	mosque	مَسْجِد	masjid
maut	dead, deadly	مَوْت	mawt
menara	tower	مَنارة	manāra
Mesir	Egypt	مِصْر	miṣr
miskin	poor	مِسْكين	miskīn
mubazir	useless	مُبَذِّر	mubaḏḏir
mufakat	approval	موافقة	muwāfaqa
muflis	bankrupt	مُفْلِس	muflis
mujizat	miracle	المعجزات	al-mujazat
mungkin	maybe	مُمْكِن	mumkin
munafik	hypocrite	مُنافِق	munāfiq
murtad	apostate	مُرْتَدّ	murtadd
musim	season	مَوْسِم	mawsim
mustahil	impossible	مُسْتَحيل	mustaḥīl
musyawarah	discussion	مشاورة	mushāwara
nabi	prophet	نَبيّ	nabiyy
nafas	breathe, respire	تَنَفَّسَ	tanaffas
nafkah	living	نفقة	nafaqa: alimony
nafsu	desire	نَفْس	nafs: self, soul
najis	impure, unclean	نَجِس	najis
nasihat	advice	نَصيحة	naṣīḥa
nikah	to marry	نِكاح	nikāḥ
nisbah	ratio	نسبة	nisb
paham	to understand	فَهْم	fahm
petuah	lesson, advice	فَتْوى	fatwā
pikir	to think	فِكْر	fikr
pondok	cottage, lodge, shack	فندق	funduq
Rabu	Wednesday	الأَرْبِعاء	al-ʼarbiʻāʼ
rahim	uterus, womb	رَحِم	raḥim
rahmat	blessing	رَحْمة	raḥma
rakyat	people, citizen	رَعيّة	raʻiyya
rasul	prophet, apostle	رَسول	rasūl
rehat, rihat	rest	راحة	rāḥa
saat	moment	ساعة	sāʻa: hour
sabar	patient	صَبْر	ṣabr
Sabtu	Saturday	السَبْت	as-sabt
sabun	soap	صابون	ṣābūn
sahabat	close friend	صَحابة	ṣaḥāba
salat	to pray (for Muslims)	صَلاة	ṣalāh
saleh	pious	صالِح	ṣāliḥ
salju	snow	ثَلْج	thalj
saraf	nerve	صَرْف	ṣarf
saum	fasting	صَوْم	ṣawm
sebab	cause, reason	سَبَب	sabab
sedekah	charitable gift, alms	صَدَقة	ṣadaqa
sehat	healthy	صِحّة	ṣiḥḥa
sirup	syrup	الشراب	sharab
selamat	safe, well-being	سَلامة	salāma
Selasa	Tuesday	الثُلاثاء	ath-thulāthāʼ
Senin	Monday	الإثْنَيْن	al-ithnayn
serikat	company, federation	شَرِكَة	sharika
setan	devil, demon	شَيْطَان	shaitan
siasat	strategy, trick	سِياسة	siyāsa: policy, strategy
sifat	characteristic, trait, quality	صِفة	ṣifa
soal	question, problem	سُؤال	suʼāl
subuh	early morning	صُبْح	ṣubḥ
sultan	king	سلطان	sultan
syariat	Islamic law	شَريعة	sharīʻa
syukur	gratitude	شُكْر	shukr
taat	obedient	طاعة	ṭāʿa
tabib	traditional healer	طَبيب	ṭabīb
takabur	arrogant	تَكَبُّر	takabbur
takdir	destiny	تقدير	taqdir: estimation
taurat	torah	تَّوْرَاة	tawrāh
terjemah	to translate	تَرْجَمة	tarjama
tertib	orderly	تَرْتيب	tartīb
umum	common, public	عُموم	ʻumūm
umur	age	عُمْر	ʻumr
unsur	element	عُنْصُر	ʻunṣur
wahid	one, the only	واحِد	wāḥid
wajah	face	وَجْه	wajh
wajib	required, compulsory	وَاجِب	wājib: duty
waktu	time	وَقْت	waqt
waris	to inherit	وارِث	wārith
wilayah	region, area	وِلاية	wilāya
yakin	confidence, sureness, belief	يَقين	yaqīn
zabur	psalms	ٱلزَّبُورِ	az-zabūr
zaitun	olive	زَيْتون	zaytūn
zakar	male genitalia	ذَكَر	dhakar
zakat	alms	زَكاة	zakāh
zaman	era	زَمَن	zaman
zamrud	emerald	زُمُرُّد	zumurrud
ziarah	pilgrimage	زيارة	ziyāra: visit
zinah	adultery	زِناء	zināʼ

==== From Persian ====
Persian is an Indo-European language under the Indo-Iranian branch, wherein Sanskrit and Hindi belongs.

Word	Meaning	Original word	Transcription, notes
anggur	grape, wine	انگور	an-gūr
awas	watch out, beware	آواز	āvāz (voice, sound, call)
baju	shirt	بازو	bāzū (arm)
bandar	port	بندر	bandar
cadar	veil	چادر	chādar
dewan	assembly, meeting	دیوان	divan (administration)
firdaus	eden, bountiful garden	فردوس	firdaus
gandum	wheat	گندم	gandum
juang	battle	جنگ	jang
kaisar	emperor	قیصر	qeysar
kismis	raisin	کشمش	kishmish
kurma	date	خرما	khurmā
medan	area, field, square	میدان	meidan
nakhoda	captain of a ship	ناخدا	nākhodā
pahlawan	hero	پ‍ﮩ‍لوان	pahlwān
pasar	market/bazaar	بازار	bāzār
pesona	charm	افسون	afsūn
piala	cup, trophy	پیاله	pyāla (cup, bowl)
pirus	turquoise	سنگ فیروزه	firuze
rubah	fox	روباه	rubah
salam	hello/regards	سلام	salam (a is pronounced like in autograph)
sihir	magic	سِحْر	sihr
syahbandar	portmaster	شاهِ بندر	shah-e bandar (lit. "king of the port")
takhta	throne	تخت	takht
taufan	typhoon	تافون	taufan
ustad	teacher (religious, Islam)	اُستَاذ	ustad
Yunani	Greece	يونان	yūnān
zirah	armor	زره	zirah

==== From Hebrew ====
Hebrew into Indonesian usually entered via Arabic or share Semitic origins. Most Hebrew loanwords are often used in religious contexts, particularly in Christianity or descriptions of Jewish history and culture.

Indonesian word	Indonesian meaning	Hebrew word	Hebrew Transliteration	Hebrew meaning	Note	Ref
betel	1. holy place, 2. a Christian denomination	בֵּיתאֵל	beth.el	house of God	usually loan rendered as bait Allah (bait is a loanword from the cognate word بَيْت (bayt) in Arabic).	
haleluya	alleluia, hallelujah	הַלְּלוּיָהּ	halleluya	alleluia, hallelujah		
hosanna	Hosanna	הוֹשַׁע נָּא	hôšânā	save, rescue, savior		
imanuel	Immanuel	עמנואל	ʿĪmmānūʾēl	God is with us		
kibbutz	kibbutz	קִבּוּץ	kibútz	kibbutz		
kosher	kosher	כַּשְׁרוּת	kashrut	foods that adhere to the dietary guidelines established by traditional Jewish law		
mazmur	psalms	מזמור	mizmor	a lyric ode, or a song set to music	see Zabur, loanword from Arabic.	
mesias	Messiah	משיח	māšīaḥ	saviour or liberator of a group of people	1. is a title addressed to Isa or Jesus in Abrahamic religious beliefs 2. see also Almasih, loanword from Arabic.	
onani	masturbation, to masturbate	אוננות	onanút	masturbation	after the Biblical figure: Onan, Genesis: 38:9	
rabi	rabbi	רַבִּי	rab.bi	rabbi		
sabat	shabbat	שַׁבָּת	shab.bat	shabbat	1. see Shabbat and Sabbath.; 2. see also sabtu, loanword from Arabic.	
shalom	Shalom	שָׁלוֹם	šālōm	peace, hello	1. see Shalom aleichem.; 2. see also Assalamualaikum, loanword from Arabic.	
tabernakel / kemah suci	Tabernacle	מִשְׁכָּן	miškān	residence, dwelling place		
Talmud	Talmud	תַּלְמוּד	Talmūḏ	central text of Rabbinic Judaism and the primary source of Jewish religious law (halakha) and Jewish theology		
Tanakh	Tanakh	תַּנַ"ךְ	Tanach	Torah, prophets, and scriptures in Judaism; from Torah, Nebiim, Ketubim		
Yahwe	Yahweh	יהוה	*see note	Yahweh	1. see Yahweh, Judeo-Christian-Islamic God.; 2. see also tetragrammaton.	
Yeshua	Yeshua	ישוע	Yēšūaʿ	salvation	The name is related to the Greek pronunciation Iesous, which, through the Latin word Iesus, became the ancestor of the Indonesian pronunciation Yesus.	

=== From East Asian languages ===
==== From Chinese ====
Chinese loanwords into Indonesian often involve cuisine, trade, or Chinese culture. According to the 2000 census, the relative number of people of Chinese descent in Indonesia (termed the peranakan) is almost 1% (totaling to about 3 million people, although this may likely be an underestimate due to an anti-Chinese sentiment that exists in some circles of the population), yet the peranakan are the most successful when it comes to business, trade, and cuisine. Words of Chinese origin (presented here with accompanying Hokkien/ Mandarin pronunciation derivatives as well as traditional and simplified characters) include pisau (匕首 bǐshǒu – knife), mie (T:麵, S:面, Hokkien mī – noodles), lumpia (潤餅 (Hokkien = lūn-piáⁿ) – springroll), teko (T:茶壺, S:茶壶 = cháhú [Mandarin], teh-ko [Hokkien] = teapot), 苦力 kuli = 苦 khu (bitter) and 力 li (energy) and even the widely used slang terms gua and lu (from the Hokkien 'goa' 我 and 'lu/li' 你 – meaning 'I/ me' and 'you'). Almost all loanwords in Indonesian of Chinese origin come from Hokkien (福建) or Hakka (客家).

==== From Japanese ====
Japanese is an East Asian language spoken by about 126 million people, primarily in Japan, where it is the official language and national language. The influx of Japanese loanword can be classified into two periods, Japanese colonial administration period (1942–1945) and globalisation of Japanese popular culture (1980–now). As Indonesian is written using Latin script, Japanese romanisation systems influence the spelling in Indonesian.

Word	Meaning	Original word
bonsai	bonsai tree, bonsai	盆栽 (bonsai)
Judo	Japanese martial art (Judo)	柔道 (Judo)
Karaoke	singing, sing	カラオケ (karaoke)
karate	Japanese martial art (Karate)	空手 (Karate)
Nama	name	名前 (namae)

==== From Korean ====
In contrast with Chinese and Japanese, Korean loanwords are mostly related to Korean culture. These loanword is attributed to increasing popularity of South Korean culture. Since the turn of the 21st century, South Korea has emerged as a major exporter of popular culture and tourism, aspects which have become a significant part of its burgeoning economy. This phenomenon is called Korean Wave.

Indonesian word	Indonesian meaning	Korean Hangul	Korean Hanja	Korean Transliteration	Korean meaning	Note	Ref
bibimbap	bibimbap	비빔밥		bibimbap	bibimbap	Korean rice dish with meat, vegetables, egg and spices that are eaten by mixing all these ingredients.	
bulgogi	bulgogi	불고기		bulgogi	bulgogi	Korean dish made from seasoned meat, processed by grilling or frying.	
kimci	kimchi	김치		kimchi	kimchi	traditional side dishmade from salted and fermented vegetables.	
mukbang	mukbang	먹방	먹放	mukbang	mukbang	Broadcast that shows people eating a lot of food.	
taekwondo	taekwondo	태권도	跆拳道	taekwondo	taekwondo	Taekwondo is a Korean martial art, characterized by its emphasis on head-height kicks, jumping and spinning kicks, and fast kicking techniques.	
won	won	원	圓	won	1. won, the currencies 2. circle	Won are currencies of South and North Korea.	

=== From European languages ===
The European influence on Indonesian is largely related to European intervention and colonialism. The most significant consequence is the continued use of the Latin alphabet instead of various local scripts.

The Portuguese arrived first in the archipelago and influenced the original Malay language after their conquest of Malacca. Portuguese dominance over trade in the region and control of the spice islands of Moluccas significantly increased Portuguese influence, as did the introduction of Christianity in the region.

However, Dutch has had the most influence on the language, as a result of the Dutch having controlled Indonesia for 300 years after eliminating Portuguese influence in the archipelago. The Dutch language itself was not introduced into the archipelago before 1799, when the Dutch government took over the colony from the already bankrupt VOC (Dutch East India company). Previously, the Malay language had adopted by the VOC due to its trade and diplomatic benefit, which led to large numbers of loanwords being introduced into the language.

English has also exerted a certain influence on the archipelago's language, being the third most favored foreign language by the educated in colonial days. More recently, English has played an increasingly large role in the nation's official language as a result of globalization.

==== From Portuguese ====
Alongside Malay, Portuguese was the lingua franca for trade throughout the archipelago from the sixteenth century through to the early nineteenth century. The Portuguese were among the first westerners to sail east to the "Spice Islands". Loanwords from Portuguese were mainly connected with articles the early European traders and explorers brought to Southeast Asia.

Word	Meaning	Original word
akta	certificate, act (law)	acta (Dutch: akte)
algojo	executioner	algoz
armada	fleet	armada
babu	servant	babo
bangku	chair	banco: bench (Dutch: bank)
baret	barrette	barrete
batako	brick	pataco
Belanda	Dutch, Holland	Holanda
bendéra	flag	bandeira
beranda	verandah, porch	varanda
biola	violin	viola
bola	ball	bola
bolu (kué)	(a type of) cake	bolo
bonéka	doll	boneca
cerutu	cigar	charuto
dansa	dance (not including traditional dance)	dança
dadu	dice	dado
gagu	mute	gago: stutterer, stuttering
ganco	hook	gancho
garpu	fork	garfo
geréja	church	igreja
gratis	free (not having to pay)	gratis (Dutch: gratis)
Inggris	England	ingrês
jendéla	window	janela
Jepang	Japan	Japão
kaldu	broth	caldo
kanal	channel	canal (Dutch: kanaal)
kéju	cheese	queijo
keméja	shirt	camisa
keréta	chariot/cart, train	carreta
kartu	card	carta
kredo	creed	credo
lelang	auction	leilão
lemari	closet	armário
meja	table	mesa
mentéga	butter	manteiga
Minggu	Sunday	domingo
misa	mass	missa
mitos	myth	mitos
nanas	pineapple	ananás
natal	Christmas	natal
noda	stain	nódoa
nona	young woman	dona
pabrik	factory	fábrica
palsu	fake, false	falso
pasta	paste	pasta
perdu	shrub	pardo: brown
pesiar	cruise, excursion	passear
pesta	party	festa
pigura/figura	picture, figure	figura
pita	ribbon	fita
pompa	pump	bomba hidráulica, (Dutch: pomp)
pribadi	personal, private	privado
roda	wheel	roda
sabun	soap	sabão
saku	pocket, bag	saco (Dutch: zak)
santo/santa	saint	santo
sekolah	school	escola (Latin: schola)
sepatu	shoe	sapato
serdadu	soldier	soldado
témpo	time	tempo
tenda	tent	tenda
terigu	wheat	trigo
tinta	ink	tinta
tolol	fool	tolo
tukar	exchange	trocar

==== From Dutch ====
The former colonial power, the Netherlands, left an extensive imprint on Indonesian vocabulary. These Dutch loanwords, as well as other non Italo-Iberian European language loanwords which were introduced via Dutch, cover all aspects of life. Some Dutch loanwords possessing clusters of multiple consonants pose difficulties for speakers of Indonesian. This problem is usually solved by the insertion of the schwa. For example, Dutch schroef [ˈsxruf] → sekrup [səˈkrup]. The months from January (Januari) to December (December) used in Indonesian are also derived from Dutch. Although Dutch loanwords are normally no longer newly developed, there is some sort of derivation using Dutch-loaned suffixes, like -si "-tion" ← Dutch -tie, -ase "-age" ← -age, and -is "-ic, -ish" ← -isch.

It is estimated that 10,000 words in the Indonesian language can be traced back to the Dutch language.

==== From English ====
Many English words are adopted in Indonesian through globalization, due to this however many Indonesians mistake words that were originally adopted from Dutch with English due to the Germanic traces that exist in the two languages (both are Indo-European Germanic languages from the same branch, the West Germanic). However, many English words in Indonesian too are borrowed via Malay (such as: sains (science), enjin (engine), botol (bottle), gaun (gown), etc.).

Word	Meaning	Original word
agen	agent	agent
agensi	agency	agency
akses	access	access
akting	acting (for drama, etc.)	acting
aktor	actor	actor
aktris	actress	actress
aktual	actual	actual (displacing Dutch actueel)
akuntabel	accountable	accountable
apostasi	apostasy	apostasy
apostel	apostle	apostle
aset	asset	asset
astronot	astronaut	astronaut
audio	audio	audio
balon	balloon	balloon
bisnis	business	business
blender	blender	blender
botol	bottle	bottle (via Malay botol)
cas	to charge (of electrical power)	charge (via Malay cas)
cek	check	check
digital	digital	digital
dasbor	dashboard	dashboard
desain	design	design
diskon	discount	discount
displai	display	display
domain	domain	domain (displacing Dutch domein)
domestik	domestic	domestic
draf	draft	draft
edit	edit	edit
efek	effect	effect
eksis	exist	exist
eksperimental	experimental	experimental (displacing Dutch experimenteel)
eksposur	exposure	exposure
elektronik	electronic	electronic
enjin	engine	engine (via Malay enjin)
entri	entry (as in "data entry")	entry
evangelikal	evangelical	evangelical
evangelisme	evangelism	evangelism
fasilitas	facility	facility
fesyen	fashion	fashion (via Malay fesyen)
fokus	focus	focus
fondasi	foundation	foundation (influenced by Dutch suffix -ie for -ion)
forensik	forensic	forensic
format	format	format
foto	photo	photo
fotografer	photographer	photographer
fotografi	photography	photography
fotokopi	photocopy	photocopy
frontal	frontal	frontal
galaksi	galaxy	galaxy
gaun	dress	gown (via Malay gaun)
gim	game	game
gitar	guitar	guitar (via Malay)
gosip	gossip	gossip
HP read:Ha-Pé (shortened word from Hand Phone)	cell phone	hand phone (used in Singapore, Malaysia, Philippines, and South Korea)
independen	independent	independent
instan	instant	instant
intelijen	intelligence	intelligence
isu	issue	issue
jus	juice	juice
kalem	calm	calm
kamera	camera	camera
kampus	campus	campus
karakter	character	character
karteker	caretaker	caretaker
kartun	cartoon	cartoon
kaset	cassette	cassette
katering	catering service	catering
katrij	ink cartridge	cartridge (via Malay katrij)
kelas	class	class
kibor	keyboard (computer or piano)	keyboard
kiper	goal keeper	keeper
klaim	claim	claim
klakson	horn	klaxon (Dutch: claxon)
klaim	claim	claim
klaster	cluster	cluster
klien	client	client
klinik	clinic	clinic
kliring	clearing (banking)	clearing
klub	club	club
koboi	cowboy	cowboy
koin	coin	coin
kokpit	cockpit	cockpit
komersial	commercial	commercial (displacing Dutch commercieel)
komitmen	commitment	commitment
kompatibel	compatible	compatible
komputer	computer	computer
komplit	complete	complete (Dutch: Compleet)
komposisi	composition	composition
kondom	condom	condom
koneksi	connection	connection
konteks	context	context
konten	content	content
konter	counter	counter (Germans: konter)
kontroversi	controversy	controversy
krim	cream	cream
kriminal	crime	criminal (displacing Dutch crimineel)
kukis	cookies	cookies
kustodian	custodian bank	custodian
lensa	lens	lens
lobi	lobby	lobby
lokomotif	locomotive	locomotive (Dutch: Lokomotief)
losion	lotion	lotion
mal	mall	mall
manajemen	management	management
matriks	matrix	matrix
mikroskop	microscope	microscope
modem	modem	modem
modern	modern	modern (Dutch: moderne)
modul	module	module
monitor	monitor	monitor
museum	museum	museum
musik	music	music
negatif	negative	negative
opsional	optional	optional
panelis	panelist	panelist
parsel	parcel	parcel
partner	partner	partner
personal	personal	personal
pilot	pilot	pilot (Dutch: Piloot)
presentasi	presentation	presentation
produksi	production	production
proses	process	process
positif	positive	positive
problem	problem	problem
proktor	proctor	proctor
prosiding	proceedings	proceeding
prosesor	processor (computing)	processor
prototipe	prototype	prototype
psikologi	psychology	psychology
radar	radar	radar
respek	respect	respect
reviu	review	review
rileks	relax	relax
riset	research	research
risiko	risk	risk
roket	rocket	rocket
sampel	sample	sample
sains	science	science (via Malay sains)
skandal	scandal	scandal
skenario	scenario	scenario
skor	score	score
skrining	screening (in the sense of "examination")	screening
siber	cyber	cyber
sinematografer	cinematografer	cinematografer
sinematografi	cinematography	cinematography
sistem	system	system (displacing Dutch systeem)
sponsor	sponsor	sponsor
stop	stop	stop
stres	stress	stress
stroberi	strawberry	strawberry
suplai	supply	supply
survei	survey	survey
taksi	taxi	taxi
target	target	target
templat	template	template
teologi	theology	theology
tiket	ticket	ticket
tisu	tissue	tissue (via Malay)
transfer	transfer	transfer
tren	trend	trend
trik	trick	trick
unit	unit	unit
virtual	virtual	virtual
visual	visual	visual
voli	volleyball	volley

==== From Greek ====
Indonesian word	Indonesian meaning	Greek word	Greek Transliteration	Greek meaning	Source word		Source meaning	Via (source)	Note	Ref
agape	agape	ἀγάπη	agápē	agape						
apokrifa	1. uncertain source.; 2. biblical apocrypha	ἀπόκρυφος	apókruphos	hidden						
apologi	1. remorse.; 2. defense	ᾰ̓πολογῐ́ᾱ	apologíā	(Ancient) defense						
apostasi	apostasy	ἀποστασία	apostasia	1. rebellion 2. defection 3. abandonment						
apostolik	apostolic	ἀποστολικός	apostolikos	related to the apostle	apostolicus		of/concerning/belonging to an apostle	Latin		
asbes, asbestos	asbestos	ἄσβεστος	ásbestos	unquenchable, inextinguishable	asbest		asbestos	Dutch	Dutch asbest (asbestos) is based on Latin asbestos (asbestos).	
askese	rigorous self-denial	ἀσκητής	askētḗs	monk, hermit						
autopsi, otopsi	autopsy	αὐτοψῐ́ᾱ	autopsíā	seeing with one's own eyes	autopsie		autopsy	Dutch	Dutch autopsie (autopsy) is based on Neo-Latin autopsia (autopsy).	
demokrasi	democracy	δημοκρατία	dēmokratía	democracy	democratie		democracy	Dutch		
diaken	deacon	διάκονος	diákonos	servant, messenger	diaken		deacon	Dutch		
diakon	deacon	διάκονος	diákonos	servant, messenger						
diakonia	diaconia	δῐᾱκονῐ́ᾱ	diākoníā	service						
ekaristi	eucharist	εὐχᾰρῐστῐ́ᾱ	eukharistíā	1. thanks, gratitude.; 2. giving of thanks.; 3. eucharist	eucharistie		eucharist	Dutch		
evangeli	Gospel	εὐάγγελος	euángelos	good news	ēvangelium		good news, Gospel	Latin		
filsafat	philosophy	φιλοσοφία	philasophia	philosophy	فَلْسَفَة	falsafa	philosophy	Arabic		
hipokrit	hypocrite	ῠ̔ποκρῐτής	hupokritḗs	1. interpreter.; 2. actor.	hypocrita		1. mimic (mime artist).; 2. hypocrite	Latin	1. The Greek word is υποκριτής (ypokritís).	
idola	idol	εἴδωλον	eídōlon	1. phantom, ghost quotations.; 2. shape, figure, image.; 3. image of the mind: idea, fancy.; 4. representation, statue, idol	idolum, idola		1. image, form, especially a spectre, apparition or ghost.; 2. idol	Latin		
idola	idol	εἴδωλον	eídōlon	1. phantom, ghost quotations.; 2. shape, figure, image.; 3. image of the mind: idea, fancy.; 4. representation, statue, idol	idool, idoolen		idol	Dutch		
idola	idol	εἴδωλον	eídōlon	1. phantom, ghost quotations.; 2. shape, figure, image.; 3. image of the mind: idea, fancy.; 4. representation, statue, idol	idol, idolum		idol	English		
mitos	myth	μῦθος	mythos	1. word, speech, conversation.; 2. tale, story, narrative.	mitos		myth (pl.)	Portuguese		
oikumene, ekumene	ecumene	οἰκουμένη	oikouménē	1. inhabited.; 2. civilised world.						
porno	pornography, lewd	πόρνη	pórnē	harlot					1. From contraction of Indonesian pornografi (pornographic), from Dutch pornografie or English pornography, from French pornographie.; 2. Pornografi is a formal word in Indonesia, while porno is informal.	
sinagogê	synagogue,	συναγωγή	synagogē	assembly	synagoge		synagogue	Dutch	Synagogue is Judaism prayer house.	
stadion	stadium	στάδιον	stadion	(Ancient) 600-foot	stadion		stadium	Dutch	The Greek word is στάδιο (stadio).	
teater	theatre	θέᾱτρον	théātron	(Ancient) theatre, play	theater		theatre	Dutch	1. The Greek word is θέατρο (théatro).; 2. Dutch theater (theatre) is based from Old French theatre, from Latin theatrum.	

==== From Latin ====
It is notable that some of the loanwords that exist in both Indonesian and Malaysian languages are different in spelling and pronunciation mainly due to how they derived their origins: Malaysian utilizes words that reflect the English usage (as used by its former colonial power, the British), while Indonesian uses a Latinate form reflected in the Dutch usage (e.g. aktiviti (Malaysian) vs. aktivitas (Indonesian), universiti (Malaysian) vs. universitas (Indonesian)).

Indonesian word	Indonesian meaning	Latin word	Latin meaning	Indirect Loanword	Indirect Source	Meaning	Note	Ref
ad interim	temporarily	ad interim						
aktivitas	activity	activitas						
almamater	alma mater	alma māter	alma mater					
alter ego	accompanying person	alter ego	another self					
devosi	devotion	dēvōtiō	devotion					
èkskomunikasi	excommunication	excommūnicātiō	excommunication	excommunicatie	Dutch	excommunication		
fakultas	faculty	facultas	faculty				The Dutch loanword faculteit was used before.	
forum	forum	forum	public place, marketplace, forum	forum	Portuguese			
hosti	sacramental bread	hostia	sacramental bread	hostie	Dutch	sacramental bread		
humaniora	humanities	hūmāniōra		humaniora	Dutch			
intērnuntius	Papal internuntius	internuntius	intermediary, messenger					
kanonis	canonical	canonicus	canonical					
kantata	song	cantata		cantada	Portuguese			
kardinal	cardinal, an official of Catholic Church	cardinālis	hinge	kardinaal	Dutch	cardinal, an official of Catholic Church		
kongrégasi	Congregation	congregātiō	Congregation	congregatie	Dutch	Congregation		
konkordat	concordat	concordatum	concordat	concordaat	Dutch	concordat		
konsèkrasi	consecration	cōnsecrātiō	consecration	consecratie	Dutch	consecration		
konsistori	consistory	consistorium	consistory	consistorie	Dutch	consistory		
kualitas	quality	qualitas					Dutch-influenced informal spelling kwalitas is used sometimes. The Dutch word is kwaliteit.	
kuria	curia	curia	curia	curia	Dutch	curia		
légio	Legion of Mary	legio	legion					
nihil	nil, nothing, zero	nihil						
nimbus	nimbus	nimbus	nimbus, dark cloud					
nota bene	actually, after look carefully, also	nota bene	examine closely					
novèna	novena	novēna	novena					
oblasi	the offering of worship, thanks etc. to a deity.	oblātiō	offering, gift					
oratorium	1. chapel, 2. oratorio, a musical composition	ōrātōrium	place of prayer, oratory	oratorium	Dutch	1. chapel, 2. oratorio, a musical composition		
ordo	1. Catholics religious group, 2. a biological taxonomy level	ōrdō	series, class, group					
pater	priest	pater	father	pater	Dutch	father (priest)		
pidato	speech	pedātō		पदार्थ (padārtha)	Sanskrit	meaning of a word		
primas	primate	prīmus	first					
rékolèksi	a spiritual retreat	recollectus	to collect again					
rèktor	rector	rēctor	leader, director, tutor	rector	Dutch	rector		
rosario	prayer beads, especially rosary	rosarium	a rose garden, rosary	rosário	Portuguese	rosary		
sakramèn	sacrament	sacrāmentum	sacrament	sacrament	Dutch	sacrament		
sakriilegi	sacrilege	sacrilegium	sacrilege					
sakristi	sacristy	sacristia	vestry	sacristie	Dutch	sacristy		
santa	saint (female)	sāncta	saint (female)	santa	Portuguese	saint (female)		
santo	saint (male)	sānctus	saint (male)	santo	Portuguese	saint (male)		
sēkulir	secular clergy	saecularis	of the age					
sivitas akademika	academic community	cīvitās acadēmica	city's academic					
stipèndium	alms (Church)	stīpendium	stipend					
tabērnakēl	tabernacle	tabernaculum	tent	tabernakel	Dutch	tabernacle		
universitas	university	universitas					The Dutch loanword universiteit was used before.	
vigili	vigil	vigil	wake, watching, alert					
vikaris	vicar	vicar	vicar					

==== From French ====
Indonesian word	Indonesian meaning	French word	French meaning	Source word	Source meaning	Source Language	Note	Ref
akur	agree, get along well	accord		akkoord		Dutch		
ala	in style of	à la						
angkét	inquiry	enquête		enquête		Dutch		
apanasē	apanage	apanage	apanage					
argot	argot, secret language	argot	argot					
arsip	archives	archives		archief		Dutch		
atasé	attaché	attaché	attaché	attaché	attaché	Dutch		
avant-garde	avant-garde	avant-garde	avant-garde	avant-garde	avant-garde	Dutch		
brevet	certificate, patent	brevet	certificate, patent					
bugénfil	bougainvillea	bougainville	bougainvillea	bougainvillea	bougainvillea	Dutch		
bulat	round	boulette	round					
chauvinisme	chauvinism	chauvinisme	chauvinism					
didong, didon	French	dis donc!						
doblé, dublé	gold-plated work	doublé	to double, duplicate					
domisili	the country that a person treats as their permanent home, or lives	domicile	domicile					
drèsoar	buffet	dressoir	dresser, sideboard					
entrepreneur	entrepreneur	entrepreneur	entrepreneur	entrepreneur	entrepreneur	English		
gala	1. first, 2. festive	galer	(Old) to have fun; to enjoy oneself	gala	ball (formal dance)	Dutch		
garnisun	garrison	garnison	garrison	garnisoen	garrison	Dutch		
guillotine	guillotine	guillotine	guillotine					
impromptu	improvised action	impromptu	improvised action					
intrik	intrigue	intrigue	intrigue	intrige	intrigue	Dutch		
kulot	shorts	culotte	panties, shorts					
kado	gift	cadeau	gift	cadeau, kado	gift	Dutch		
kampanye	campaign	campagne	campaign	campagne	campaign	Dutch		
karantina	quarantine	quarantine	quarantine	quarantaine	quarantine	Dutch		
karoseri	the body of vehicle, car, coach, or bus	carrosserie	bodywork, body (of car)	carrosserie	body, bodywork of a motorized vehicle.	Dutch		
klise	cliche	cliché	cliche	cliché	cliche	Dutch		
kondèktur	conductor (ticket-related)	conducteur	driver	conducteur	conductor (ticket-related)	Dutch		
kornet	cornet, a brass instrument	cornet à pistons	cornet, a brass instrument					
kudeta	coup d'état	coup d'état	coup d'état					
kupe	train seat	coupé	car					
legiun	legion	légion	legion	legioen	legion	Dutch		
letnan	lieutenant	lieutenant	lieutenant	luitenant	lieutenant	Dutch		
libur	free (from activities)	libre						
manuver	maneuver	manœuvre	maneuver	manoeuvre	maneuver	Dutch		
mayones	mayonnaise	mayonnaise	mayonnaise					
mèmoar	memoirs	mémoire	memoirs					
milieu	milieu	milieu	milieu	milieu	milieu	Dutch		
monseigneur	monsignor	monseigneur	monsignor	monseigneur	monsignor	Dutch		
piknik	traveling to a place outside the city to have fun bringing food supplies, sightseeing	piquenique	picnic					
première	premiere	première	first	première	premiere	Dutch, English		
pual	voile	voile	1. veil.; 2. sail					
restan	remnant, remainder	restant	remnant, remainder	restant	remnant, remainder	Dutch		
restoran	restaurant	restaurant	restaurant	restaurant	restaurant	Dutch		
retret	retreat	retraite	1. retirement 2. withdrawal	retraite	retreat	Dutch		
sabotase	sabotage	sabotage	sabotage	sabotage	sabotage	Dutch		
sepeda	bicycle	vélocipède	bicycle					
supir	driver	chauffeur	driver	chauffeur	driver	Dutch		
tante	aunt	tante	aunt					
tiras	circulation, of newspaper or magazine	tirage						
trotoar	sidewalk	trottoir	sidewalk	troittoir				

==== From North Germanic ====
The North Germanic languages make up one of the three branches of the Germanic languages, a sub-family of the Indo-European languages, along with the West Germanic languages and the extinct East Germanic languages. The language group is sometimes referred to as the "Nordic languages", a direct translation of the most common term used among Danish, Swedish, Icelandic and Norwegian scholars and laypeople.

Indonesian word	Indonesian meaning	North Germanic word	North Germanic Language	North Germanic meaning	Notes	Ref
fjord / fiord	fjord	fjord	Danish	fjord		
kjökkenmodding(er)	midden	kjøkkenmødding	Norwegian	midden		

== See also ==
- List of English words of Indonesian origin
- List of loanwords in Malay
- Loan words in Sri Lankan Tamil
- Indonesian history
- Differences between Malay and Indonesian
