= Juai =

Juai may refer to:

- Lower Yangtze Mandarin (ISO 639 language code juai)
- Juai, a fictional character from Detatoko Princess portrayed by Shiho Niiyama
- Juai, Tanjung, Tabalong, South Kalimantan, Kalimantan, Indonesia; a village on Borneo
- Juai, Balangan Regency, South Kalimantan, Kalimantan, Indonesia; a district on Borneo

== See also ==
- jūái; see List of loanwords in Malay
- /ˌjuːˈaɪ/ (GUI); see graphical user interface
- Juglans ailantifolia (JUAI2), the Japanese walnut
