= List of English words of Indonesian origin =

The following is a partial list of English words of Indonesian origin. The loanwords in this list may be borrowed or derived, either directly or indirectly, from the Indonesian language. Some words may also be borrowed from Malay during the British colonial period in British Malaya, or during the short period of British rule in Java. However, unlike loanwords of Malay origin, some of these loanwords may be derived from languages of Indonesia such as Javanese, Sundanese, Minangkabau, Buginese, Makassarese, Acehnese, and many more.

Examples of English loanwords of Indonesian origin are those related to Indonesian culture and artforms (e.g. angklung, batik, kris and wayang), as well as words used to describe flora and fauna endemic to the Indonesian archipelago (e.g. babirusa, cockatoo, orangutan and Komodo). Other recently adopted loanwords include food related terms (e.g. agar and tempeh) and specific volcanology terms (e.g. lahar and ribu).

== Animals ==
- Anoa, small wild ox of Sulawesi
- Babirusa, compound word from babi (pig) and rusa (deer)
- Banteng
- Bantam, from the town of Banten / ᮝᮠᮔ᮪ᮒᮨᮔ᮪ wahanten (Sundanese)
- Binturong
- Cassowary from kasuari or suari, man suar (Biak)
- Cockatoo from kakatua
- Dugong from duyung
- Gecko
- Gourami from gurami
- Komodo dragon, from Komodo
- Orangutan
- Pangolin from pengguling or trenggiling
- Siamang
- Tokay (gecko) from tokek
- Trepang from teripang

== Plants and trees ==
- Burahol from ᮘᮥᮛᮠᮧᮜ᮪ burahol (Sundanese)
- Champak from cempaka, derived from ᮎᮙ᮪ᮕᮊ campaka (Sundanese)
- Gambier from gambir
- Gutta percha from getah perca (Indonesian)
- Kapok from kapuk, the Malay name for the tree Bombax ceiba
- Macassar hair preparation, from Makassar, a city in Indonesia
- Meranti a kind of tropical tree
- Merbau a kind of tropical tree
- Paddy from padi (Indonesian)
- Pandanus from pandan
- Ramie from rami
- Rattan from rotan
- Sago from sagu
- Cajuput from kayu Putih

== Fruits ==
- Cempedak
- Durian
- Langsat
- Mangosteen from manggis (manggustan)
- Rambutan
- Salak, also known as Zalacca

== Foods ==
- Agar
- Krupuk
- Rendang
- Sambal
- Satay from sate (Javanese)
- Tempeh from tempe

== Clothes and textiles ==
- Batik from Batik (Javanese)
- Canting from canting (Javanese)
- Gingham from genggang
- Ikat
- Koteka (Mee)
- Sarong from sarung / சரம் caram (Tamil)
- Songket

== Musical instruments ==
- Angklung from ᮃᮀᮊᮣᮥᮀ angklung (Sundanese)
- Gamelan from ꦒꦩꦼꦭꦤ꧀
- Gong from ꦒꦺꦴꦁ gong (Javanese)
- Kendang from (Javanese)

== Ships ==
- Junk from jong
- Proa (also 'prahu' or 'prau') from prahu (Javanese) or perahu (Indonesian) originated from Portuguese proa.

== Weapons ==
- Kris from keris (Javanese)
- Parang
- Sjambok from cambuk in Indonesia, where it was the name of a wooden rod for punishing slaves
- Tombac from tombak

== Person name ==
- Mata Hari from matahari (sun)

== Units ==
- Catty from கட்டி kaṭṭi (Tamil), ultimately derived from Chinese unit
- Picul: traditional Asian weight unit, derived from Javanese pikul
- Ribu: topographic prominence unit of mountain or volcano more than 1,000 metres, derived from Indonesian ribu (thousand)

== Behavior and psychology ==
- Amok from amuk
- Latah

== Sports ==
- Bantam, from bantam chicken, ultimately Banten town
- Silat
- Sepak takraw

== Others ==
- Balanda to refer whiteman, from belanda (Dutchman)
- Camphor, from kapur barus ("Barus' chalk"), which refers to the port of Barus in Sumatra as the source of camphor
- Damar, plant resin
- Lahar from lahar (Javanese)
- Compound from kampung, which is Indonesian for "village".
- Warung
