= Congregate =

Congregate may refer to:

- Gathering place, a location where people gather or congregate
- Kongregate, game aggregation website

== See also ==
- Congregate care (disambiguation)
- Congregation (disambiguation)
