= List of loanwords in Malay language =

Overview of Malay loanword origin from other languages

Modern form of Malay language in general has many loanwords from Sanskrit, Persian, Tamil, Greek, Latin, Portuguese, Dutch, Siam (Old Thailand), Khmer and Deutsch (Germany). More recently, loans have come from Arabic, English, Japanese and Malay's distant cousin such as Javanese and Buginese. English and other romance/germanic loans are mostly related to trade, science and technology while Arabic loans are mostly religious as Arabic is the liturgical language of Islam, the religion of the majority of Malay speakers. Some were also used in science, makmal for example mean laboratorium. Although Hinduism and Buddhism are no longer the major religions of Malaysia, Brunei, and Indonesia, Sanskrit, the vehicular language for these religions, is still held in high esteem, and its status is comparable with that of Latin in English and other Western European languages. The main reason is that Indian Muslims left big legacy in Southeast Asia. Sanskrit is also the main source for neologisms; these are usually formed from Sanskrit roots. For example, the name of cities of Putrajaya and Petaling Jaya (the second name) in Malaysia, Bandar Seri Begawan in Brunei, and the name of Jayapura city (former Hollandia) and Jayawijaya Mountains (former Orange Range) in the Indonesian province of Papua were coined in the 1960s; the latter two are Sanskrit origin names to replace its Dutch colonial names. Some Indonesian contemporary medals of honor and awards, such as Bintang Mahaputra medal, Kalpataru award and Adipura award, are also Sanskrit derived names. The loanwords from Sanskrit cover many aspects of religion, art and everyday life. The Sanskrit influence came from contacts with India long ago before the 1st century. The words are either directly borrowed from India or through the intermediary of the Old Javanese language. In the classical language of Java, Old Javanese, the number of Sanskrit loanwords is far greater. The Old Javanese — English dictionary by Prof. P.J. Zoetmulder, S.J. (1982) contains no fewer than 25,500 entries. Almost half are Sanskrit loanwords. Sanskrit loanwords, unlike those from other languages except Arabic and Persian, have entered the basic Malay vocabulary to the point that they are no longer perceived to be foreign. Indonesian has inclination toward Sanskrit in formulation of new words due to extensive Javanese and Balinese-speaking community, while Malaysian and Bruneian Malay prefer Arabic as source for neologism due to acceptance of Islamic Arabic practices. Arabic in Indonesian tends to reside in (Islamic) religious sphere, the presence of Sanskritised neologism in Malaysian and Bruneian Malay is a result of "importation" from Indonesian. Other austronesian elements are also incorporated from the variant of Malay used in Indonesia due to the exchange of influence on the Indonesian media in Malay pop culture and vice-versa.

Dutch influence over Indonesian vocabulary is highly significant, as Malay was adopted due to usefulness as a trading language during the Dutch East India Company's rule over the archipelago. This has led to approximately 10,000 Dutch words being borrowed into Indonesian. Malay as spoken in Malaysia (Bahasa Melayu) and Singapore, meanwhile, have more borrowings from English.

There are some words in Malay which are spelled exactly the same as the loan language, e.g. in English – museum (Indonesian), hospital (Malaysian), format, forum, hotel, transit etc. By contrast, some Malay words have been loaned into other languages, e.g. in English – rice paddy ("padi"), orangutan, rattan, babirusa, cockatoo, compound, gong, tuak, sago, cootie, amok, durian, agar, rambutan, keris, Pantoum/pantun, angrecum (anggrek/ anggrik), cassowary, gingham, caddie, camphor (kapur), Gutta-percha (getah perca), launch, parang, sarong, dammar, and gambir.

Malay has also heavily influenced the forms of colloquial English spoken in Malaysia, also known as Manglish.

Some examples are as follows:

Word	English translation	From language	Word
abjad	alphabet/alefbet	Arabic	أبجد / abjad
abolisi	abolition	Dutch	abolitie
akta	act (law)	Latin	actus
aktiviti	activity	English	activity
aktivitas	activity	Latin	āctīvitās
ad interim	temporarily	Latin	ad interim
Ahad	Sunday	Arabic	الأحد / al-Aḥad
ahli	community, expert	Arabic	أهل / ahl
agama	religion	Sanskrit	आगम / āgama
akhbar	news	Arabic	أخبار / akhbār
aksara	alphabetic letter, key	Sanskrit	अक्षर / akṣara
almari (Indonesian: "lemari")	cupboard	Portuguese	armário
almamater	revered name for one's university	Latin	alma mater: wise and nurturing mother
amnesti	amnesty, state-granted pardon	Latin	amnestia
anggur	grape	Persian	انگور / angūr
angkasa	outer space, sky (literary)	Sanskrit	आकाश ākāśa "sky"
anugerah	award, blessing	Sanskrit	anugraha अनुग्रह "favour"
apam	kind of cake or hopper	Tamil	appam அப்பம்
arak	liquor	Arabic	عَرَق /ʽaraq
arnab	rabbit	Arabic	أرنب / ʻarnab
askar	soldier	Persian	عسكرى / ʻaskarī / asker
asmara	love, passion	Sanskrit	स्मर / smara "memory, sexual love"
badam	almond	Persian	بادام / bādām
bahasa	language	Sanskrit	भाषा / bhāṣā, Tamil பாஷை / pācai
bahaya	danger	Sanskrit	भय / bhaya "risk, peril"
baju	shirt	Persian	بازو / bâzu "arm"
baki	remainder, leftover	Arabic	باقي / bāqī
bakti	homage, devotion, service	Sanskrit	भक्ति / bhakti
baldi	bucket	Portuguese	balde
bandar	port/town	Persian	بندر / bandar
bangku	stool/chairs	Portuguese	banco / bench
bangsa	nation, race	Sanskrit	वंश / vaṃśa "lineage, race" - cf. "wangsa"
bus | bas	bus	English	bus, from Latin "omnibus"
basikal	bicycle	English	bicycle
bayu (lit.)	wind	Sanskrit	वायु / vāyu
bendera	flag	Portuguese	bandeira
bendi (in Indonesian, it means "gig", different with "bhendi" in Hindi)	okra/lady's finger	Hindi	भेंडी bhēṇḍī, Tamil veṇṭi / வெண்டி
becak | beca	trishaw	Hokkien (Chinese)	馬車,马车 / bé-tshia "horse-cart"
beda | beza	difference	Sanskrit	भेद / bheda "cleft, partition, contrast, division"
biara	monastery	Sanskrit	विहार / vihāra
bidadari	fairy, angel	Sanskrit	विद्याधरी / vidyādharī "fay, sprite"
bina	to build	Arabic	بناء / bināʼ / bina 'construction'
bihun	rice vermicelli	Hokkien (Chinese)	米粉 / bí-hún
biola	violin	Portuguese	viola
biskuit | biskut	biscuit	English	biscuit
bohsia	sexually active girl	Hokkien (Chinese)	無聲 bô siaⁿ 'without voice'
bomba	fire brigade	Portuguese	bomba, "pump", or bombeiro, "fireman", lit. "pumper"
boneka	doll	Portuguese	boneca
bola	ball	Portuguese	bola
budi	reason, virtue	Sanskrit	बुद्धि / buddhi "intelligence, mind, reason"
buku	book	Dutch	boek
bumi	earth	Sanskrit	भूमि / bhūmi "land"
cadar	bed linen	Persian	چادر / chādar "cloak"
cakoi	youtiao	Hokkien (Chinese)	油炸粿 / iû-tsia̍h-kué
cawan	cup	Mandarin (Chinese)	茶碗 / cháwǎn '“tea bowl”
cendana	sandalwood	Sanskrit	चन्दन / candana
dacin | dacing	scales	Hokkien (Chinese)	台秤 / tâi-tshìn
dakwah	sermon	Arabic	دعوة / daʻwah
daerah	district	Arabic	دَائِرَة / dā'ira
degil	headstrong, stubborn	Sinhala	ඩීගිල් / ḍīgil
delima	pomegranate, ruby	Sanskrit	दालिम / dālima or दाडिम / dāḍima "pomegranate"
demokrasi	democracy	Greek	δημοκρατία / dēmokratía
dekan	dean	Portuguese	decano
denda	fine, punishment	Sanskrit	दण्ड / daṇḍa "rod"
desa	countryside, village	Sanskrit	देश / deśa "country"
dewan	hall	Persian	دیوان / dīvān "administration"
dewi	Goddess	Sanskrit	देवी / devī "goddess"
dirgahayu	"long live" (Dirgahayu Tuanku! - Long live the King!)	Sanskrit	दिर्घायु / dirghāyu "long-lived"
deskriptif	descriptive	English	descriptive
dobi	laundry	Hindi	धोबी / dhobī "caste of laundrymen who used to wash people's clothes in bygone days"
duka	sadness	Sanskrit	दुःख / duḥkha "sorrow, distress, suffering"
dunia	world	Arabic	دنيا / dunyā / dünya
durjana	evil, wicked, malicious	Sanskrit	दुर्जन / durjana "bad man, villain"
email | emel	email	English	email
erti (Indonesian variant "arti")	meaning	Sanskrit	अर्थ / artha "aim, purpose"
falsafah	philosophy	Arabic	Arabic فلسفة / falsafah, from Ancient Greek φιλοσοφία / philosophía
fitnah	slander	Arabic	فتنة / fitnah "upheaval, scandal"
forum	forum	Latin	forum
gabi	Midnight snack	Maranao	gabi
gajah	elephant	Sanskrit	गज / gaja
gandum	wheat	Persian	گندم / gandom
ganja	cannabis, marijuana	Sanskrit	गञ्जा / gañjā
garaj	garage	English	garage
garasi	garage	Dutch	garage
garpu	fork	Portuguese	garfo
gereja	church	Portuguese	igreja
grafik	graph	Dutch	grafiek
grafik	graphic	English	graphic
gratis (mainly in Indonesian usage)	for free	Dutch	gratis
guru	teacher	Sanskrit	गुरु / guru "heavy, venerable"
had	limit	Arabic	حد / ḥadd
halal	permitted	Arabic	حلال / ḥalāl
haram	forbidden	Arabic	حرام / ḥarām
harta	asset, treasure	Sanskrit/Tamil	arttam/அர்த்தம், Sanskrit अर्थ / artha - cf "erti"
hartal	strike, civil disobedience	Gujarati	હડતાળ / haḍtāḷ, હડતાલ / haḍtāl (pronunciation with r via Hindustani ہڑتال)
haiwan | hewan	animal	Arabic	حيوان / ḥaywān
hasta	hasta (unit)	Sanskrit	हस्त / hásta
hina	lowly, inferior, mock	Sanskrit	हीन / hīna
hisab	counting/arithmetic	Arabic	حساب / ḥisāb
humaniora (mainly Indonesian)	humanities	Latin	humaniora
huruf	word character/letter	Arabic	حرف / ḥarf (plural حروف ḥurūf)
ilmu	knowledge	Arabic	علم / ʻilm
intiha	the end of a point	Arabic	intiha انتہا
istana	palace	Sanskrit	आस्थान / āsthāna "assembly, audience hall"
jawab | jawap	to answer	Arabic	جواب / jawāb / Cevap
jelata	the masses	Sanskrit	जनता / janatā "folk, community"
jendela (mainly in Indonesian usage)	window	Portuguese	janela
Jepang	Japan	Hokkien (Chinese)	Ji̍t-pún 日本
Jepun	Japan	Hokkien (Chinese)	Ji̍t-pún 日本
jibaku	effort/fight	Japanese	jibaku 自縛
jiran	neighbour	Arabic	jiran جيران
Jumat | Jumaat	Friday	Arabic	الجمعة / al-Jumʿah
Kamis | Khamis	Thursday	Arabic	الخميس / al-Khamīs
kaca	glass (material)	Sanskrit	काच / kāca "glass, crystal, lens"
kamus	dictionary	Arabic	قاموس / qāmūs / kamus
kantata (mainly Indonesian)	song	Latin	cantata
kapal	boat	Tamil	kappal கப்பல்
kauki/koki	goji berry	Hokkien (Chinese)	枸杞 / kóo-kí
kaunter (Indonesian: konter (alternative of loket))	counter, desk	English	counter
kedai	foodstall, shop	Tamil	kaṭai கடை
keju	cheese	Portuguese	queijo
kelas	class	English	class
kemeja	shirt	Portuguese	camisa
kepala	head	Sanskrit	कपाल / kapāla "skull"
kerana (Indonesian: karena)	because	Sanskrit	कारण / kāraṇa
kuli	coolie / port worker	Hindustani	قُلى qulī (itself derived from a Turkic language)
karton	carton (classifier for packaging)	English	carton
kartun	cartoon (animated movie)	English	cartoon
kereta	carriage, car, (Indonesian: train)	Portuguese	carreta
kerusi | kursi	chair, stool	Arabic	كرسي kursii
kemah | khemah	tent	Arabic via Persian	خیمة / khaymah
kuil	temple/shrine	Tamil	kōyil கோயில்
kismis	raisin	Persian	کشمش / kishmish
kolam	pool	Tamil	kuḷam குளம்
koma-koma	saffron	Sanskrit / Arabic	कुङ्कुम / kuṅkuma
kompromi	compromise	The pronunciation (lack of the "s" phoneme) suggests that this was borrowed from French (perhaps via Dutch)	compromis
komputer	computer	English	computer
kurkuma	saffron, turmeric	Sanskrit / Arabic	कुङ्कुम kuṅkuma 'saffron', influenced by Arabic كركم kurkum 'turmeric'
kongsi	share, divide	Hokkien (Chinese)	公司 / kong-si
korban	sacrifice	Arabic	قربان / qurbān
kota	city	Tamil	கோட்டை / kōṭṭai
kredo	creed	Latin	credō
kucai	chives	Hokkien (Chinese)	韭菜 / kú-tshài
kuda	horse	Tamil	கோடை kōṭai < Sanskrit घोट ghoṭa
kue | kuih | kek	cake	Hokkien (Chinese)	kué 粿
kualitas	quality	Latin	quālitās
kualiti	quality	English	quality
kurma	date	Persian	خرما / khormā
lancia | lanca	rickshaw	Hokkien (Chinese)	人車,人车 / lâng-tshia "human drag cart"
lelong	auction	Portuguese	leilão
lemari (Malaysian: "almari")	cupboard	Portuguese	armário
lirik	lyrics	English	lyrics
lobak	carrot	Cantonese (Chinese)	蘿蔔,萝卜 / lo^{4} baak^{6}
longan	longan	Cantonese (Chinese)	龍眼,龙眼/ long^{4} ngaan^{5}
lungkang | longkang	drain, sewer	Hokkien (Chinese)	龍江,龙江 / liông-kang
lori	truck/lorry	English	lorry
maaf	sorry	Arabic	معاف / muʻāf 'pardoned'
mahsul	Harvest	Arabic	mah-sul محصول
maha	great	Sanskrit	महा / mahā
makmal	laboratory	Arabic	معمل / maʻmal
mangga	mango	Tamil	mangkāy மாங்காய்
mani	sperm, semen	Arabic / Sanskrit	مني / manī, Sanskrit मणि / maṇi "bead, jewel, gem"
manusia	human	Sanskrit	मनुष्य / manuṣyá
masjid	mosque	Arabic	مسجد / masjid
maya	illusion (religious), imaginary	Sanskrit	माया / māyā
medan	area, field, square	میدان / meidan	
mentega	butter	Portuguese	manteiga
mi | mee | mie	noodles	Hokkien (Chinese)	麵 / mī
mastautin	domicile, new home	Arabic	masta-utin ماستاوتين
meja	table	Portuguese	mesa
melati	jasmine (jasminum grandiflorum)	Sanskrit	मालती / mālatī
merana	suffering, wasting away	Sanskrit	मारण / māraṇa "death"
merarau	lunch, synonym of "makan tengah hari"	Iban	merarau
merdeka	free, independent(Country)	Sanskrit	महर्द्धिक / mahārdhika
merdu	melodious, tuneful	Sanskrit	मृदु / mṛdu "soft"
mesej	message	English	message
minggu	week, Sunday (Indonesian)	Portuguese	domingo (domingo means Sunday, "dominus" meaning "Lord" in Latin and "die dominicu" meaning "day of the Lord")
miskin	poor	Arabic	مسكين / miskīn
misi	mission	Latin (via English)	missiō
mitos	myth	Greek	μύθος / mýthos
motosikal	motorcycle	English	motorcycle
muhibah	goodwill	Arabic	muhibbah موهبه "loving"
muflis	bankrupt	Arabic	مفلس / muflis
mula | mulai	to start, to begin	Sanskrit	मूल / mūla "root, origin"
munafik	hypocrite	Arabic	منافق / munāfiq
mungkin	maybe, perhaps, possibly	Arabic	ممكن / mumkin "possible"
mustahil	impossible	Arabic	مستحيل / mustaḥīl 'impossible, absurd'
museum	museum	Dutch	museum
muzium	museum	English	museum
nadi	pulse, artery	Sanskrit	नाडी / nāḍī
najis	excrement	Arabic	نجس / najis
nama	name	Sanskrit	नामन् / nāman
naratif	narrative	English	narrative
negara	country	Sanskrit	नगर / nagara "town, city"
nanas | nenas	pineapple	Tupi language	ananás
neraka	hell	Sanskrit	नरक / naraka
nihil	nil, nothing, zero	Latin	nihil
nisbah	ratio	Arabic	نِسْبَة / nisba
nota bene	actually, after look carefully, also	Latin	nota bene: note well, examine closely
nujum (in the compound ahli nujum)	astrologer	Arabic	نجوم nujūm 'stars'
nila	indigo dye	Sanskrit	नील / nīla "dark blue"
nilam	sapphire	Sanskrit	नीलं / nīlam "blue"
nobat	royal ensemble music	Arabic	نَوبة nawbah 'turn; changing of guards; bugle call; troupe of musicians'
Nusantara	archipelago (Southeast Asia Archipelago)	Javanese / Sanskrit	Nusantara
oknum	authority figure (police, soldier, prosecutor, judge) that perform unlawful or corrupted deed	Arabic	أقنوم uqnūm < Syriac ܩܢܘܡܐ qnoma 'person'
origami	art of folding paper from Japan	Japanese	origami 折り紙
paderi	priest (Christian)	Portuguese	padre
pahala	divine reward	Sanskrit	फल / phala "fruit"
pahlawan	hero/warrior	Persian	پهلوان / pahlavān
pancaragam	musical band	Sanskrit	pañca पञ्च "five" + rāga राग "melody/tune/musical note"
paracut | parasut	parachute	English	parachute
pau | pao	steamed bun	Chinese	"bāo" 包. False etymology ascribes the origin of the word to Portuguese pão (bread), but this is incorrect; a form of the word "bāo" was already present in Middle Chinese to refer to steamed dumplings.
perak	silver	possibly of Khmer origin	
perkasa	mighty	Sanskrit	प्रकाश / prakāśa "enlightened"
permaisuri	supreme lady, queen	Sanskrit	परम parama 'supreme' + ईश्वरी īśvarī 'female ruler', via Tamil பரமேஸ்வரி paramēsvari
perpustakaan	library	Sanskrit	base word pustaka / पुस्तक "book, manuscript"
pesta	party	Portuguese	festa
pasar	market, bazaar	Persian	بازار / bāzār / pazar
peta	map	Tamil	paṭam படம் 'cloth; picture'
perdana menteri	prime minister	Sanskrit	pradhānamantri प्रधानमन्त्रिन्
pertama	first	Sanskrit	प्रथम / prathama
pertiwi	native soil, motherland	Sanskrit	पृथिवी / pṛthivī or पृथ्वी / pṛthvī "mother goddess of the earth"
piala	cup (in the sense of a trophy)	Persian	پیاله / piyālah
pita	tape, knot	Portuguese	fita
puasa	fasting	Sanskrit	उपवास / upavāsa
puja	idolize, worship	Sanskrit	पूजा / pūjā
pura	Hindu temple, city	Sanskrit	पुर / pura "city, walled enclosure"
purnama	(of the moon) full	Sanskrit	पूर्णमा / pūrṇamā - cf. "sempurṇa"
putra | putera	prince, male child	Sanskrit	पुत्र / putra
purba	ancient	Sanskrit	पूर्व / purva
rahasia | rahsia	secret	Sanskrit	रहस्य / rahasya "private, mystery"
raja	king	Sanskrit	राजन् / rā́jan
Rabu	Wednesday	Arabic	الأربعاء / al-Arbaʻāʼ
raksasa	monster	Sanskrit	राक्षस / rākṣasa "demon, demoniacal"
rasa	taste, feeling	Sanskrit	रस / rasa
ratna	jewel, gemstone	Sanskrit	रत्न / ratna
renda	lace	Portuguese	renda
risiko	risk	Dutch	risico
roda	wheel	Portuguese	roda
ronda	verb, to patrol	Portuguese	verb rondar or noun ronda
rokok	cigarette	Dutch	roken "to smoke"
roti	bread	Sanskrit/Hindi	रोटी roṭī 'bread'
rupa	shape, form, appearance	Sanskrit	रूप / rūpa
sabda	quote, say	Sanskrit	शब्द / śabda "sound, word"
Sabtu	Saturday	Arabic	السبت / al-Sabt
sabun	soap	Arabic to Portuguese	Portuguese sabão < صابون ṣābūn < Late Latin sapo < Proto-Germanic saipon
sahaja (Indonesian: "saja")	only, casual, relaxed (e.g. duduk bersahaja "seated casually"), (something) alone	Sanskrit	सहज / sahaja "simple, natural, sudden"
sains	science	English	science
sama	same	Sanskrit	सम / sama
samseng	gangster	Hokkien (Chinese)	三牲 / sam-sing
sakti	miraculous power, powerful	Sanskrit	शक्ति / śakti "strength, ability"
salju | salji	snow	Arabic	ثلج thalj
sekolah	school	Portuguese	escola
seks	sex	English	sex, from Latin
selamat	safe, well-being	Arabic	سلامات salāmāt, used for greeting phrases as 'selamat pagi', etc.
Selasa	Tuesday	Arabic	الثلاثاء / al-Thulāthāʼ
sempurna	perfect, complete	Sanskrit	संपूर्ण / sampūrṇa "complete, whole" - cf. "purnama"
sengsara	Suffering	Sanskrit	संसार / saṃsāra "wandering through"
Senin (Malaysian: "Isnin")	Monday	Arabic	الإثنين / al-Ithnayn
spanduk | sepanduk	banner	Dutch	spandoek
sekolah	school	Greek	σχολή skholē
sepatu (mainly in Indonesian usage)	shoe	Portuguese	sapato
serigala	wolf	Sanskrit	शृगाल / śṛgāla "jackal"
seteru	adversary, enemy	Sanskrit	शत्रु / śatru "foe, rival"
singa	lion	Sanskrit	siṁha सिंह
sebab	reason	Arabic	السبب / alsabab
sejarah	history	Arabic	شجرة shajarah 'tree'
sengkuang	Pachyrhizus erosus	Philippine from Nahuatl via Spanish	Philippine singkamás < Spanish jícama < Classical Nahuatl xīcama
seks	sex	English	Sexual intercourse
serdadu | soldadu (obsolete)	soldier	Portuguese	soldado
stadion	stadium	Dutch	stadion
stadium	stadium	English	stadium
status	status	Latin	status
stesen	station	English	station
sopir | supir (dialectal/Indonesian)	driver	French	chauffeur
syariah	Islamic law	Arabic	الشريعة / sharīʻah
syarikat	company	Arabic	شركة / sharika
syukur	thankful, grateful	Arabic	شكر / shukr / Şükür
syurga | surga	heaven	Sanskrit	स्वर्ग / svargá
sistem	system	English	system
suci	clean, pure, wise	Sanskrit	शुचि / śuci "shining, clear"
suka	like someone/something, happiness	Sanskrit	सुख / sukha "easy, pleasant, comfort"
sula	to impale	Sanskrit	शूल / śūla "stake, spear, pike"
syor	recommendation	Mandarin (Chinese)	說,说 / shuō
suria | surya	sun	Sanskrit	सूर्य / sūrya
takhta	throne	Persian	تخت / takht 'platform'
tangki	tank	Portuguese	tanque
tanglung	lantern	Cantonese/Hokkien (Chinese)	燈籠,灯笼 / tanglong
tapau	takeaway	Cantonese (Chinese)	打包 / daa^{2} baau^{1}
topan | taufan	typhoon	Persian	طوفان
taoge | taugeh	bean sprouts	Hokkien (Chinese)	豆芽 / tāu-gê
tahu | tauhu	bean curd, know	Hokkien	豆腐 / tāu-hū
tarikh	date	Arabic	تاريخ / tārīkh
teh	black tea	Hokkien (Chinese)	茶 / tê
taksi | teksi	taxi	English	taxi
teja (archaic)	magnificence, splendor, radiance	Sanskrit	तेजस् / tejas "sharp edge, glow, splendor"
teko	teapot	Hokkien (Chinese)	茶壺,茶壶 / tê-ko
televisyen	television	English	television
tembaga	copper	Spanish or Sanskrit,	tāmra ताम्र (Sanskrit) or tumbaga (Spanish).
tempo | tempoh	period	Portuguese	tempo "time"
terima	to receive	Sanskrit	तारिम / tārima "gratefulness"
tsunami	huge wave from the sea	Japanese	Tsunami 津波
topi	hat	Sanskrit/Hindi	टोपी ṭopī
tteokboki	rice cake of Korea	Korean	deokboki 떡볶이
tuala	towel	Portuguese	toalha
tukar	to exchange, switch	Portuguese	trocar
umur	age	Arabic	عمر / ʻumur
universitas	university	Latin	universitas
universiti	university	English	universiti
unta	camel	Hindi	ऊँट ūṇṭ < Sanskrit उष्ट्र uṣṭra
upacara	ritual, ceremony	Sanskrit	उपचार / upacāra "approach, service"
usia	age	Sanskrit	आयुष्य / āyuṣya
utama	main	Sanskrit	उत्तम / uttama "principal" (adj.)
utara	north	Sanskrit	उत्तर / uttara "upper, higher, better, later"
waham	delusion	Arabic	وهم/wahm
waktu	time	Arabic	وقت / waqt
wangsa	dynasty	Sanskrit	वंश / vaṃśa "lineage, race" - cf. "bangsa"
wanita	woman	Sanskrit	वनिता / vanitā
wantan	wonton	Cantonese (Chinese)	雲吞,云吞 / wan^{4} tan^{1}
warna	colour	Sanskrit	वर्ण / varṇa "form, shape, covering, race, species, kind"
warta	news	Sanskrit	वार्त्ता / vārttā
zarafah | zirafah | jerapah	giraffe	Arabic	زرافة / zarāfah

== See also ==
- List of English words of Malay origin
- List of loanwords in Indonesian
- List of words of Malay origin at Wiktionary
