= Congregation =

Congregation may refer to:

== Religion ==
- Church (congregation), a religious organization that meets in a particular location
- Congregation (Roman Curia), an administrative body of the Catholic Church
- Religious congregation, a type of religious institute in the Catholic Church
- Congregation (group of houses), in some religious orders of the Catholic Church

== Music ==
- The Congregation (band), an English pop group
- Congregation (The Afghan Whigs album), 1992, and its title song
- Congregation (Kerbdog album), 2014
- The Congregation (Johnny Griffin album), 1957
- The Congregation (Leprous album), 2015
- "Congregation" (song), by Foo Fighters, 2014

== Other uses ==
- Congregation (university), a formal meeting of a university

== See also ==
- Congregate (disambiguation)
- Congregational church, Protestant churches in the Reformed (Calvinist) tradition
- Qahal, an Israelite organizational structure often translated as 'congregation'
