= Consistory =

Consistory is the anglicized form of the consistorium, a council of the closest advisors of the Roman emperors. It can also refer to:

- A papal consistory, a formal meeting of the Sacred College of Cardinals of the Roman Catholic Church
- Consistory court, a type of ecclesiastical court in the Church of England in the United Kingdom
- In Scandinavia, the Chapter of a cathedral
- Consistory (Protestantism), a distinct governmental and ecclesiastical office in Europe
- In continental Reformed churches, a session or governing body of a local church
- Consistory (Judaism), a body governing the Jewish congregations of a province or of a country, primarily those under French influence; also the district administered by the consistory
- The Spiritual Consistory, an ecclesiastical office in the Russian Orthodox Church during the Synodal period
