= Tombac =

Copper-zinc alloy

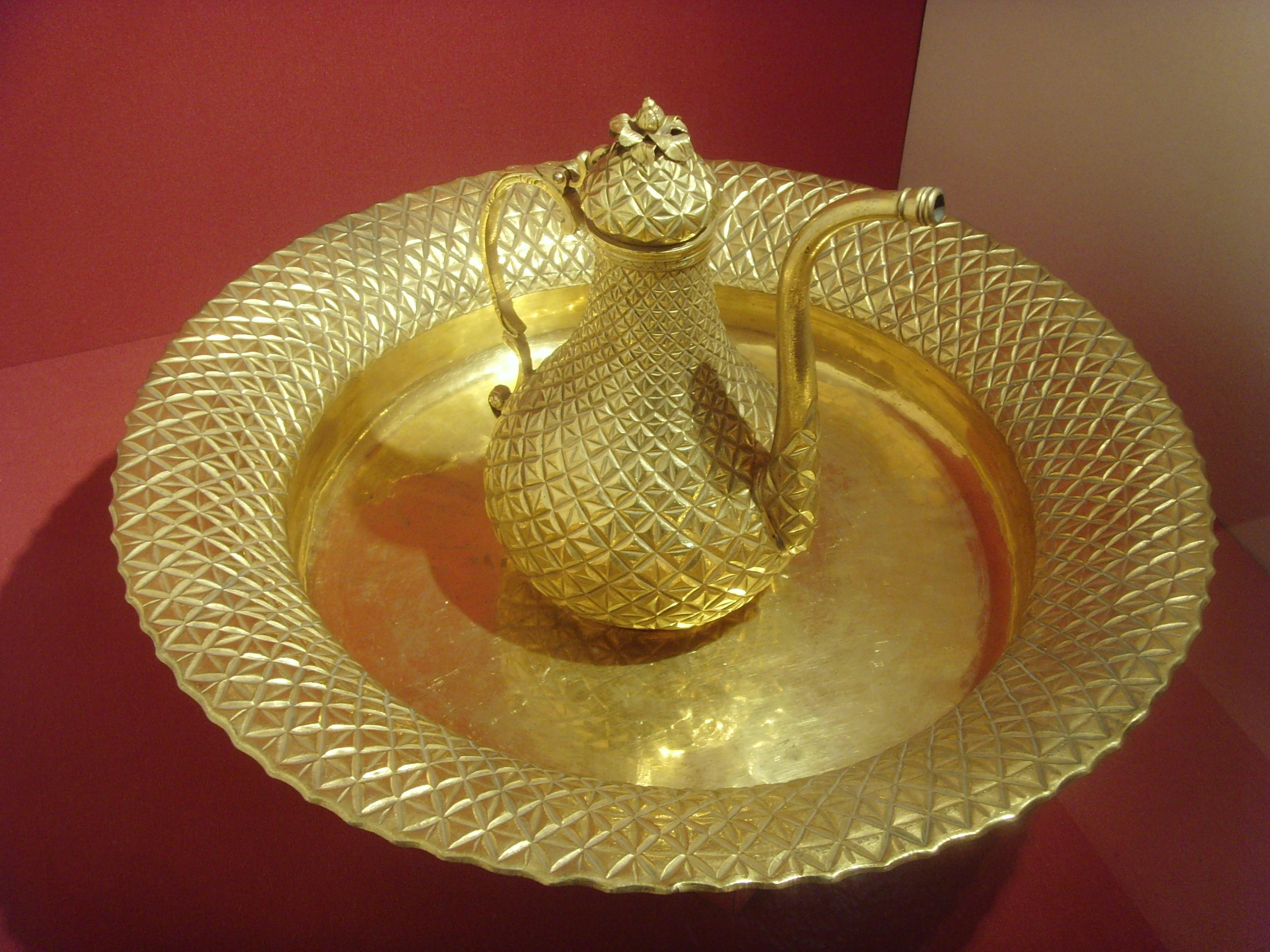
Ottoman tombac ewer and basin set – 1870 – Collection of Turkish and Islamic Arts Museum – Brought to museum in 1926 from the tomb of Sultana Pertevniyal

Tombac, also spelled tombak, is a high-copper brass alloy. Historical descriptions generally treat it as a form of red brass containing less zinc than ordinary yellow brass. Its composition has varied: 19th-century sources record tombac with zinc contents below 20 percent, sometimes with smaller amounts of tin or lead.

Tombac has been used for decorative metalwork, medals, military fittings and ammunition components. Historical formulations were used for objects including gilt ornaments and sword handles, while later examples include medals, coins and bullet jackets.

== Etymology ==
The term tombak is derived from tembaga, an Malay word of Javanese origin meaning 'copper'. Tembaga entered Dutch usage concurrent with their colonisation of Indonesia. Likely, the term was used generically to describe Indonesian high-copper brass items, including gamelan gongs. It is one of the very few Indonesian loan words used in English or German.

== Common types ==
Andrew Ure, writing in the late 19th century, and summarising with regard to "Tomba[c], or red brass", states that "in the cast state, [it] is an alloy of copper and zinc, containing not more than 20 per cent of the latter constituent." He notes that the specific gravity of brass, in general, is "greater than the mean density of its constituents, varying from 7.82 to 8.73, according to the proportion of zinc and copper". He goes on to note, with regard to tombac in particular—which he uniformly spells as "tombak" (as will thus appear in his quotations)—that its specific gravities are yet higher, with "sheet tombak (81.25 copper + 18.75 zinc) [being] 8.788" and that "tombak wire (87.5 copper + 12.5 zinc) has been found so great as 9.00".

On publishing his A dictionary of the Arts, Manufactures, and Mines in England in 1839, and republishing in the U.S. 1856, Ure noted that,

"Red brass, the Tombak of some... consists of more copper and less zinc, than go to the composition of [yellow] brass [at 70 copper, 30 zinc]; [Tombak] being from 2½ to 8 or 10 of the former [copper] to 1 of the latter [zinc]. At the famous brass works of Hegermühl... 11 parts of copper are allowed with 2 of zinc into red brass, from which plates are made that are afterward rolled into sheets. From such an alloy the Dutch foil, as it is called, is manufactured at Nürnberg; Pinchbeek, Similor, Mannheim gold, are merely different names of alloy similar to Prince's metal. The last consists of 3 of copper and 1 of zinc, separately melted, and suddenly incorporated by stirring.

A.S. Piggot, writing in 1858, offered a distinct definition of tombac (likewise using the varian "k" spelling), and perhaps drawing from Ure, stated that:

Red brass, or tombak, as it is called by some, has a great preponderance of copper, from 5 ounces of zinc down to ¼ ounce of zinc to the pound [of copper]. At Hegermühl, 11 parts of copper are alloyed with 2 of zinc to make a red brass, which is afterward rolled into sheets. At Nürnberg, Dutch foil is made from a similar alloy.

Piggot also states separately that the brass used for machinery and locomotives in England was composed of copper 74.5%, zinc 25%, and lead 0.5%, a combination that would make it a tombac according to Ure.

Other tombac compositions that Ure reports are:

- "tombak for making gilt articles"—
  - Copper 82.0%, zinc 18.0%, lead 1.5%, tin 3.%;
  - Copper 82%, zinc 18%, lead 3%, tin 1%; and
  - Copper 82.3%, zinc 17.5%, tin 0.2%. And
- "French tombak for sword handles, &c.": copper 80%, zinc 17%, tin 3%;
- "tombak of the Okar, near Goslar, in the Hartz": copper 80%, zinc 17%, tin 3%;
- "yellow tombak of Paris for gilt ornaments": copper 85%, zinc 15%, tin a trace percentage;
- "tombak for [gilt ornaments] from... Hanover": copper 85.3%, zinc 14.7%;
- a tombak he refers to as "chrysochalk" or "Alkeizatlee": copper 86%, zinc 14%;
- "Red tombac from Paris": copper 90.0%, zinc 7.9%, 1.6% lead; and
- "Red tombac of Vienna": copper 97.8%, zinc 2.2%.

Other alloy formulations include:

- "white tombac": ca. 90% copper and 10% zinc, with trace arsenic; and
- "enamel" or "emailler tombak", suitable for enamelling: ca: 95% copper and 5% zinc.

Ure goes on to report a further composition, with proportions given in the "parts" of each metal—

- "Prince's metal": 3 parts copper and 1 part zinc.

He then goes on to report further compositions, in "parts", starting from copper and "yellow brass" (the "mean proportion... [of that being] 30 zinc to 70 copper"), rather than presenting fundamental constituents—

- "Pinchbeck": "2 parts copper and 1 yellow brass"; and
- "Mannheim gold (semilor)": 2.8 parts copper, 1.2 parts yellow brass, 0.3 parts tin.

Ure goes on to note that the alloy from which a form of "white metal buttons" are cast is composed of 3.2 parts yellow brass, 0.4 parts zinc, 0.2 parts tin.

With regard to modern forms, compositions include:

- "CuZn15" (DIN, ISO): UNS, C23000; BS, CW 502L (CZ 102)—tombac with gold colour, good for cold forming, suitable for pressing, hammering, or embossing;
- "CuZn12": a non-standardized tombac form, with same characteristics and applications as CuZn15, but of slightly different colour;
- "CuZn10" (DIN, ISO): UNS, C22000; BS, CW 501L (CZ 101)–tombak with similar characteristics and applications as CuZn15 and CuZn12, but with a noticeable reddish colour.

=== Tempers ===
Typical tempers are soft annealed and rolled hard.

== Applications ==
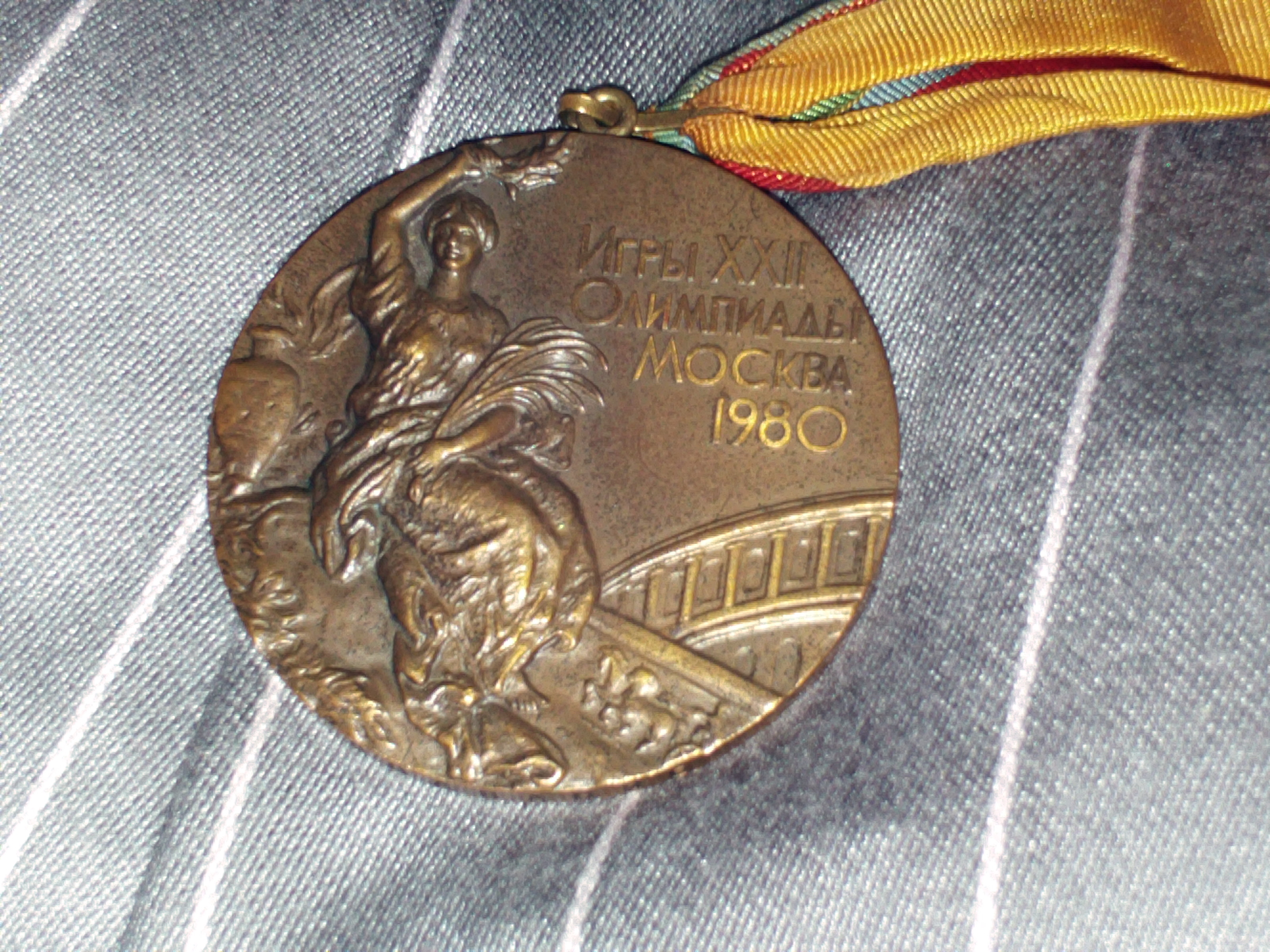
A "bronze" medal (actually tombac) from the 1980 Summer Olympics

Tombac is soft and easy to work by hand: hand tools can easily punch, cut, enamel, repousse, engrave, gild, or etch it. It has a higher sheen than most brasses or copper, and does not easily tarnish. Historically, it was used by the Javanese as a faux gold finish for objects d'art and ornaments.

- Most commonly, tombac in modern society is used in medals and awards of lesser importance, such as the German Oldenburg Long-Service Medallion for their Gendarmerie, and the Visit to Ireland Medal 1900 for the Irish police forces.
- The Pickelhaube and cuirass of the Imperial German and Prussian Army were at one time made of tombac.
- German, particularly Prussian, field uniforms (which were also sold to equip the White Russians), had buttons and decorative fittings made of tombac.
- Currently, tombac foils are used in arts and crafts for decorative articles, especially as an economic alternative to very expensive gold leaf.
- Industry uses tombac foil for heating foils and etch applications.
- Gilding metal is a type of tombac which is one of the most common jacketing materials for full metal and hollow-point jacketed bullets.
- The 1980 Olympic 'Bronze' medals were actually tombac.
- During World War II, the Royal Canadian Mint produced 5-cent pieces (nickels) in tombac in 1942 and 1943.
- The German military used it for some combat medals during World War II.
- The Swedish Armed Forces adopted a special-service round for the Carl Gustav m/45 submachine gun with a tombac-plated steel jacket surrounding the lead core of the bullet loaded in the cartridge. While the lands of the barrel can cut into the tombac, the steel jacket resists deformation and thus causes the gas pressure to rise higher than the previous soft-jacketed m/39, giving the 6.8-gram (105 gr) bullet a muzzle velocity of 420 m/s (1,378 ft/s).
- Brass alloys, including tombak, are occasionally used in architecture, such as ornaments, roofs or outside wall plating. It withstands corrosion well.

== See also ==
- Tumbaga – Alloy of gold and copper used in pre-Columbian Mesoamerica
