= List of German expressions in English =

The English language has incorporated various loanwords, terms, phrases, or quotations from the German language. A loanword is a word borrowed from a donor language and incorporated into a recipient language without translation. It is distinguished from a calque, or loan translation, where a meaning or idiom from another language is translated into existing words or roots of the host language. Some of the expressions are relatively common (e.g., hamburger), but most are comparatively rare. In many cases, the loanword has assumed a meaning substantially different from its German forebear.

English and German both are West Germanic languages, though their relationship has been obscured by the lexical influence of Old Norse and Norman French (as a consequence of the Norman conquest of England in 1066) on English as well as the High German consonant shift. In recent years, however, many English words have been borrowed directly from German. Typically, English spellings of German loanwords suppress any umlauts (the superscript, double-dot diacritic in Ä, Ö, Ü, ä, ö, and ü) of the original word or replace the umlaut letters with Ae, Oe, Ue, ae, oe, ue, respectively (as is done commonly in German speaking countries when the umlaut is not available; the origin of the umlaut was a superscript E).

German words have been incorporated into English usage for many reasons:

- German cultural artifacts, especially foods, have spread to English-speaking nations and often are identified either by their original German names or by German-sounding English names.
- Developments and discoveries in German-speaking nations in science, scholarship, and classical music have led to German words for new concepts, which have been adopted into English: for example the words doppelgänger and angst in psychology.
- Discussion of German history and culture requires some German words.
- Some German words are used in English narrative to identify that the subject expressed is in German, e.g., Frau, Reich.

As languages, English and German descend from the common ancestor language West Germanic and further back to Proto-Germanic; because of this, some English words are essentially identical to their German lexical counterparts, either in spelling (Hand, Sand, Finger) or pronunciation ("fish" = Fisch, "mouse" = Maus), or both (Arm, Ring); these are excluded from this list.

German common nouns fully adopted into English are in general not initially capitalized, and the German letter "ß" is generally changed to "ss".

== German terms commonly used in English ==
Most of these words will be recognized by many English speakers; they are commonly used in English contexts. Some, such as wurst and pumpernickel, retain German connotations, while others, such as lager and hamburger, retain none. Not every word is recognizable outside its relevant context. A number of these expressions are used in American English, under the influence of German immigration, but not in British English.

=== Food and drink ===
- Altbier—a copper coloured, malt-forward, clean and crisp tasting, lighter-bodied beer with moderate bitterness from Rhineland.
- Berliner Weisse (German spelling: Berliner Weiße)—a sour beer often infused with fruit syrup.
- Biergarten—an open-air drinking establishment.
- Bock—a strong beer.
- Braunschweiger—a liverwurst cold-cut (though, in Germany, Braunschweiger describes a smoked ground beef sausage).
- Bratwurst (also brat)—a type of frying sausage.
- Budweiser—a beer, named after Budweis, the German name of Budějovice, a city in Southern Bohemia.
- Bundt cake (from Bundkuchen; in German: a Gug(e)lhupf)—a ring cake.
- Delicatessen (German spelling: Delikatessen)—a speciality food retailer; fine foods. However, in Germany, the word and article der Feinkostladen is used.
- Dunkel (also Dunkles)—a dark beer.
- Emmentaler (also Emmental)—a yellow, medium-hard Swiss cheese that originated in the area around Emmental, Canton Bern.
- Frankfurter (also frank or frankfurt)—a type of sausage.
- Gose—a top-fermenting sour beer that originated in Goslar, Germany.
- Grätzer—a beer style named after Grätz, the German name of Grodzisk Wielkopolski, a city in Greater Poland
- Gugelhupf—a type of cake with a hole in the middle.
- Gummi bear (in German: Gummibär, but the product is only known as Gummibärchen (diminutive))—the non-Anglicized spelling of gummy bear.
- Hamburger—a sandwich with a meat patty and garnishments.
- Hasenpfeffer—a type of rabbit (or hare) stew.
- Hefeweizen—an unfiltered wheat beer (containing yeast).
- Helles (also Hell)—a pale lager beer.
- Jagertee (from Austrian-Bavarian dialects; German spelling: Jägertee)—an alcoholic beverage made by mixing overproof rum with black tea, red wine, plum brandy, orange juice, and various spices.
- Kaiser roll—a round bread roll, originally from Austria.
- Kellerbier—a lager beer, which is typically neither clarified nor pasteurised.
- Kinder Surprise (also known as a "Kinder Egg")—a chocolate egg containing a small toy, usually requiring assembly (in Germany: Überraschungsei and Kinder-Überraschung). However, despite being a German word, the Kinder chocolate brand is actually of Italian origin.
- Kipfel (also kipferl)—a horn-shaped type of pastry.
- Kirschwasser—a spirit drink made from cherries (hard liquor / booze).
- Knackwurst—a cooked sausage.
- Kohlrabi—a type of cabbage (aka "cabbage turnip").
- Kölsch—a beer style from Cologne.
- Kommissbrot—a dark type of German bread, baked from rye and other flours.
- Lager—a beer made with bottom-fermenting yeast and stored for some time before serving (in Germany: an Export).
- Leberwurst—a pork-liver sausage.
- Liptauer—a spicy cheese spread made with sheep milk cheese, goat cheese, quark, or cottage cheese, after Liptau, the German name of Liptov, a region in northern Slovakia.
- Märzen (also Märzenbier)—a medium to full body lager beer.
- Maß—a unit of volume used for measuring beer; typically 1 litre (0.22 imp gal; 0.26 US gal), but probably evolved from the old Bavarian unit of measure (Maßeinheit) called Quartl (quart).
- Mozartkugel, (literally "Mozart ball")—a small, round sugar confection made of pistachio marzipan, and nougat, covered with dark chocolate.
- Muesli—a breakfast cereal. (Swiss German spelling: Müesli, standard German: Müsli)
- Noodle (from German Nudel)—a type of food; a string of pasta.
- Pfeffernüsse—peppernuts.
- Pilsener (also Pils or Pilsner)—a pale lager beer named after Pilsen, the German name of Plzeň, a city in Western Bohemia; contains higher amounts of hops than usual Lager (or Export) beer, and therefore is a tad more bitter.
- Powidl—a spread made from plums.
- Pretzel (standard German spelling: Brezel or Breze)—a flour and yeast-based pastry.
- Pumpernickel—a type of sourdough rye bread, strongly flavored, dense, and dark in color.
- Quark—a type of fresh cheese (curd).
- Radler—a mixture of beer and lemonade.
- Rollmops—a rolled, pickled herring fillet.
- Saaz—a variety of hops named after Saaz, the German name of Žatec, a city in Northwestern Bohemia.
- Sauerkraut (also Kraut, which in German would mean cabbage in general)—fermented cabbage.
- Schnapps (German spelling: Schnaps)—a distilled alcoholic drink (hard liquor, booze).
- Schwarzbier—a dark lager beer.
- Seltzer—carbonated water, a genericized trademark that derives from the German town Selters, which is renowned for its mineral springs.
- Spritzer (from spritzen meaning "to spray"; the term is most commonly used in Vienna and its surroundings; in German: (Wein-)Schorle, rarely Gespritzter)—a chilled drink from white wine and soda water.
- Stein (from Steingut meaning "earthenware", referring to the material; in German: Steinkrug, literally earthenware jug)—a large drinking mug, usually for beer.
- Streusel—a crumb topping on a cake.
- Strudel—a filled pastry (e.g., Apfelstrudel, milk-cream strudel).
- Süffig—a beverage that is especially light and sweet or palatable; only the latter meaning is connoted with German süffig.
- Tafelspitz—boiled veal or beef in broth, served with a mix of minced apples and horseradish.
- Weisslacker (also Bierkäse)—a type of cow's milk cheese.
- Wiener—a hot dog. Derived from the German demonym Wiener, or Viennese.
- Wiener Schnitzel—a crumbed veal cutlet.
- Wurst—a sausage, cold cuts.
- Zwieback—a "twice baked" bread; rusk, variants: German hard biscuits; Mennonite double yeast roll

=== Sports and recreation ===
- Abseil (German spelling: sich abseilen, a reflexive verb, to rope (Seil) oneself (sich) down (ab))—the term "abseiling" is used in the UK and Commonwealth countries, "roping (down)" in various English settings, and "rappelling" in the US.
- Blitz (from Blitzkrieg, literally 'lightning war'), a team defensive play in American or Canadian football in which the defense sends more players than the offense can block. The term Blitz was originally used in London to describe a Nazi bombing offensive at the start of World War II.
- Foosball, probably from the German word for football, Fußball, although foosball itself is referred to as Kicker or Tischfußball in German. Fußball is the word for soccer in general.
- Karabiner (from Karabinerhaken; can also mean a Carbine firearm in German), snaplink, a metal loop with a sprung or screwed gate, used in climbing and mountaineering; translates to "riflehook".
- Kutte (literally 'frock' or 'cowl, monk's habit'), a type of (cut-off) vest made out of denim or leather and traditionally worn by bikers, metalheads, and punks
- Kletterschuh, a climbing shoe (mountaineering).
- Mannschaft, a German word for a sports team.
- Rucksack (more commonly called a backpack in American English)
- Schuss, literally a shot (ski) down a slope at high speed.
- Treibball, the name of a dog sport.
- Turner, a gymnast.
- Turnverein, a gymnastics club or society.
- Volksmarching, from Volksmarsch, literally 'people's march'.

=== Animals ===
- Dachshund, a dog breed, literally "badger dog" (usually referred to as Dackel in German usage)
- Doberman Pinscher, a dog breed (usually referred to as Dobermann in German)
- Hamster, a small rodent often kept as a household pet
- Olm, an exclusively cave-dwelling aquatic salamander found in Europe.
- Pomeranian, a dog breed
- Poodle, a dog breed, from German Pudel
- Rottweiler, a dog breed
- Schnauzer, a dog breed (though in German, Schnauzer could also be short for Schnauzbart, meaning "moustache")
- Siskin, several species of birds (from Sisschen, dialect for Zeisig)
- Spitz, a dog breed

=== Philosophy and history ===
- Antifa, short for "Antifaschistische Aktion" (anti-fascist action)
- Lebensraum, literally "living space"; conquered territory, now exclusively associated with the Nazi Party in that historical context. In Germany, the word usually simply means 'habitat'
- Nazi, short for Nationalsozialist (National Socialist)
- Neanderthal (modern German spelling: Neandertal), for German Neandertaler, meaning "of, from, or pertaining to the Neandertal ("Neander Valley")", the site near Düsseldorf where early Homo neanderthalensis fossils were first found.
- Schadenfreude, "joy from pain" (literally "harm joy"); delight at the misfortune of others
- Wanderlust, the yearning to travel
- Zeitgeist, spirit of the time

=== Society and culture ===
- Doppelgänger, literally "double-goer", also spelled in English as doppelgaenger; a double or look-alike. However, in English the connotation is that of a ghostly apparition of a duplicate living person.
- Dreck, literally "dirt" or "smut", but now meaning trashy, awful (through Yiddish, OED s.v.)
- Dummkopf, literally "stupid head"; a stupid, ignorant person, similar to "numbskull" in English
- Fest, festival
- Fingerspitzengefühl (literally "finger-tip feeling", in German used to mean "empathy", "sensitivity" or "tact")
- Gemütlichkeit, coziness
- Gesundheit, literally health; an exclamation used in place of "bless you!" after someone has sneezed
- Hausfrau, pejorative: frumpy, petty-bourgeois, traditional, pre-emancipation type housewife whose interests centre on the home, or who is even exclusively interested in domestic matters (colloquial, American English only), sometimes humorously used to replace "wife", but with the same mildly derisive connotation. The German word has a neutral connotation.
- Kaffeeklatsch, literally "coffee gossip"; afternoon meeting where people (usually referring to women, particularly Hausfrauen) chitchat while drinking coffee or tea and having cake.
- Kindergarten, literally "children's garden"; day-care centre, playschool, preschool
- Kitsch, cheap, sentimental, gaudy items of popular culture
- Kraut, literally "cabbage"; derogatory term for a German
- Lederhosen (short leather pants for men and boys, often worn with suspenders)
- Meister, "master", also as a suffix: –meister; in German, Meister typically refers to the highest educational rank of a craftsperson, various ranks, and to sports champions up to Weltmeister. Note: Meister does not refer to the academic master degree (which is now Master or formerly Magister, formerly Diplom-engineer and so forth)
- Oktoberfest, Bavarian folk festival held annually in Munich during late September and early October
- Poltergeist, literally "noisy ghost"; an alleged paranormal phenomenon where objects appear to move of their own accord
- Sitzfleisch, endurance or persistence, especially when requiring sitting for a long time
- Spiel, literally "game"; an attempt to present and explain a point in a way that the presenter has done often before, usually to sell something. A voluble line of often extravagant talk, "pitch"
- uber, über, "over"; used to indicate that something or someone is of better or superior magnitude, e.g. Übermensch
- Wunderkind, literally "wonder child"; a child prodigy

=== Technology ===
- –bahn as a suffix, e.g. Infobahn, after Autobahn
- Bandsalat, literally "tape salad", refers to a tangle of magnetic tape.
- Blücher, a half-boot named after Prussian Field Marshal Gebhard Leberecht von Blücher (1742–1819); also a hand in the British card game Napoleon.
- Ersatz, replacement; usually implying an artificial and inferior substitute or imitation. In German, the word has a neutral connotation, e.g. Ersatzrad simply means "spare wheel" (not an inferior one).
- Flak, Flugabwehrkanone, literally: air-defence cannon, for anti-aircraft artillery or their shells, also used in flak jacket; or in the figurative sense: "drawing flak" = being heavily criticized
- Kraft as in kraft paper, a strong paper used to make sacks; Kraft in German just means "strength" or "power"
- Plandampf, running a scheduled train service with historic steam locomotives, popular with railway enthusiasts.
- Spitzer, from German Spitzgeschoss 'point shot', a type of bullet
- Volkswagen, literally "people's car"; brand of automobile
- Zeppelin, type of rigid airship, named after its inventor

=== Other aspects of everyday life ===
- erlaubt, allowed, granted; opposite of verboten.
- Fußgängerübergang - crosswalk.
- kaput (German spelling: kaputt), out-of-order, broken, dead
- nix, from German nix, dialectal variant of nichts (nothing)
- Scheiße, an expression and euphemism meaning "shit", usually as an interjection when something goes amiss
- Ur- (German prefix), original or prototypical; e.g. Ursprache, Urtext
- verboten, prohibited, forbidden, banned. In English this word has authoritarian connotations.

== German terms common in English academic context ==
German terms sometimes appear in English academic disciplines, e.g. history, psychology, philosophy, music, and the physical sciences; laypeople in a given field may or may not be familiar with a given German term.

=== Academia ===
- Ansatz, educated guess
- Doktorvater, doctoral advisor
- Festschrift, book prepared by colleagues to honor a scholar, often on an important birthday such as the sixtieth.
- Gedenkschrift, memorial publication
- Leitfaden, guideline
- Methodenstreit, disagreement on methodology
- Privatdozent, in German it describes a lecturer without professorship (typically requires German Habilitation degree).
- Professoriat, the entity of all professors of a university
- Wissenschaft, scholarship, research and study in general

=== Architecture ===
- Abwurfdach, removal roof of early modern European fortresses
- Angstloch, literally "fear hole", a small hole in the floor of a medieval castle or fortress through which a basement room (popularly described as a "dungeon") can be accessed
- Bauhaus, a German style of architecture founded by Walter Gropius in 1918
- Bergfried, a tall tower typical of Central European medieval castles
- Biedermeier, of or relating to a style of furniture developed in Germany in the 19th century; in German, it might also derogatively describe a certain old-fashioned, ultra-conservative interior styling. It also describes a certain type of literature in the beginning of the industrialization that represents a longing for the traditional life at that time, with themes of nature and calmness, untouched by the modern world.
- Burgwall, fort rampart
- Hügelgrab, in archeology, burial mound
- Jugendstil, art nouveau
- Kachelofen, a cocklestove, a kind of masonry heater covered in tile
- Passivhaus, house built to eco-friendly standards, ultra-low energy buildings which need little fuel for heating or cooling
- Pfostenschlitzmauer, in archeology, a method of construction typical of prehistoric Celtic hillforts of the Iron Age
- Plattenbau, building made from prefabricated slabs; a typical building style of the late 1960s and throughout the 1970s, particularly associated with East Germany
- Schwedenschanze, early historical Ringwork and Rampart of fortification
- Sondergotik, a Late Gothic architectural style found in Central Europe between 1350 and 1550
- Stolperstein, literally "stumbling stone", metaphorically a "stumbling block" or a stone to "stumble upon", a cobblestone-size (10 by 10 centimetres (3.9 in × 3.9 in)) concrete cube bearing a brass plate inscribed with the name and life dates of victims of Nazi extermination or persecution
- Viereckschanze, in archaeology, a Celtic fortification of the Iron Age

=== Arts ===
- Gesamtkunstwerk, "the whole of a work of art", also "total work of art" or "complete artwork"
- Gestalt (lit. "shape, figure"), a collection of entities that creates a unified concept (where "the whole is more than the sum of its parts")

==== Heraldry ====
- Seeblatt, heraldic Charge
- Schwurhand, heraldic Charge

==== Music ====
- Affektenlehre, the doctrine of the affections in Baroque music theory
- Almglocken, tuned cowbells
- Alphorn, a wind instrument
- Augenmusik, eye music
- Ausmultiplikation, a musical technique described by Karlheinz Stockhausen
- Blockwerk, medieval type of church organ featuring only labial pipes
- Crumhorn, from German Krummhorn, a type of woodwind instrument
- Fach, method of classifying singers, primarily opera singers, by the range, weight, and color of their voices
- Fackeltanz, a kind of polonaise associated with German royal wedding celebrations
- Fife, from Pfeife, a small transverse flute often used in military and marching bands
- Flatterzunge (literally "flutter tongue"), playing technique for wind instruments
- Flugelhorn (German spelling: Flügelhorn), a type of brass musical instrument
- Glockenspiel, a percussion instrument
- Heldentenor, "heroic tenor"
- Hammerklavier, "hammer-keyboard", an archaic term for piano or the name of a specific kind of piano, the fortepiano; most commonly used in English to refer to Beethoven's Hammerklavier Sonata
- Hosenrolle, a term for male character, literally "trousers' role"
- Hummel, a stringed instrument
- Kapellmeister, "music director"
- Katzenjammer, hubbub or uproar; in German, the term Katzenjammer could also mean hangover.
- Katzenklavier, cat organ, a conjectural instrument employing live cats
- Kinderklavier, piano for children
- Klangfarbenmelodie, a term coined by Arnold Schoenberg regarding harmonic theory
- Konzertmeister, concert master
- Kuhreihen, song originally used for gathering cows for milking
- Leitmotif (German spelling: Leitmotiv) a musical phrase that associates with a specific person, thing, or idea
- Lied (pronounced "leet"), "song"; specifically in English, "art song"
- Lieder ohne Worte, "songs without words"
- Liederhandschrift, a manuscript containing medieval songs
- Liederkranz, (originally male) singing club
- Liedermacher, singer-songwriter
- Marktsackpfeife, a type of bagpipes
- Meistersinger, Master-singer
- Mensurstrich, barline that is drawn between staves
- Minnesang, medieval love poetry
- Musikalisches Würfelspiel, a composing technique featuring the use of random number generators, i.e. dice (Würfel)
- Ohrwurm, catchy tune
- Orgelbewegung, a movement of organ building featuring a more baroque sound and organ architecture
- Rauschpfeife, a type of woodwind instrument
- Rückpositiv (also rendered as Ruckpositiv)
- Sängerfest, a Central European tradition of music festivals that also spread to North America
- Schlager, "a hit" (German schlagen, to hit or beat)
- Schottische, literally "Scottish", a folk dance
- Schuhplattler, a regional dance from Upper Bavaria and Austria
- Singspiel, German musical drama with spoken dialogue
- Sitzprobe, rehearsal of a musical stage work where singers are sitting and without costumes
- Sprechgesang and Sprechstimme, forms of musical delivery between speech and singing
- Strohbass, creaky voice
- Sturm und Drang, "storm and stress", a brief aesthetic movement in German literature, just before Weimar Classicism
- Urtext, "original text" (of the composer)
- Volksmusik, traditional German music
- Walzer (Waltz), ballroom and folk dance
- Zukunftsmusik, music of the future

===== Genres =====
- Kosmische Musik: a Krautrock-associated genre of electronic music pioneered by Popol Vuh
- Krautrock: German-like English name for a variety of German rock
- Neue Deutsche Härte (NDH): "New German Hardness"; a genre of German rock that mixes traditional hard rock with dance-like keyboard parts. Recently it has begun to appear in English.
- Neue Deutsche Todeskunst: "New German Death Art": a movement within the darkwave and gothic rock scenes
- Neue Deutsche Welle (NDW): "New German Wave". A genre of German music originally derived from punk rock and new wave music.
- Neue Slowenische Kunst: "New Slovenian Art". An art collective dating back to the 1980s, when Slovenia was part of Yugoslavia. Most prominently associated with the band Laibach, named after the German name for Slovenia's capital city, Ljubljana.
- Romantische Oper: genre of early nineteenth-century German opera

===== Selected works in classical music =====
- Johann Sebastian Bach's Das wohltemperierte Klavier (The Well-Tempered Clavier); Jesus bleibet meine Freude (Jesu, Joy of Man's Desiring; note that the common name of this work in English is not a translation of the German text)
- Brahms's Schicksalslied (Song of Destiny)
- Kreisler's Liebesleid (Pain of Love), Liebesfreud (Joy of Love)
- Liszt's Liebesträume (Dreams of Love)
- Mozart's Eine kleine Nachtmusik (A Little Serenade); Die Zauberflöte (The Magic Flute)
- Gustav Mahler's Kindertotenlieder (Songs on Dead Children)
- Schubert's Winterreise (Winter Journey)
- Schumann's Dichterliebe (The Poet's Love)
- Richard Strauss's Der Rosenkavalier (Cavalier of the Rose); Also sprach Zarathustra (Thus Spoke Zarathustra); Vier letzte Lieder (Four last songs)
- Johann Strauss II's Die Fledermaus (The Bat); An der schönen blauen Donau (On The Beautiful Blue Danube)
- Richard Wagner's Die Walküre (The Valkyrie); Götterdämmerung (Twilight of the Gods); both from his opera cycle Der Ring des Nibelungen (The Ring of the Nibelung)

===== Carols =====
- Stille Nacht: "Silent Night"
- O Tannenbaum: "O Christmas Tree"

===== Modern songs =====
- 99 Luftballons: "99 Balloons" (English title: "99 Red Balloons") by Nena
- Schrei nach Liebe: "Scream for love" by Die Ärzte
- Feuer frei!: "Fire at will" (literally, "fire freely!") by Rammstein
- Der Kommissar: "The Commissioner" by Falco

==== Theatre ====
- Theaterpädagogik, "theatre pedagogy", the use of theatre as a means for teaching and learning in non-theatrical areas of study
- Verfremdungseffekt, effect of disassociation or alienation

==== Typography ====
- Fraktur, a style of blackletter typeface
- Schwabacher, a style of blackletter typeface, from the Franconian town of Schwabach

=== Biology ===
- Ahnenreihe, line of ancestors
- Ahnenschwund, pedigree collapse
- Ahnentafel, line of ancestors
- Anlage in genetics; also used in the sense of primordium in embryology and temperament in psychology; literal meaning "disposition" or "rudiment"
- Aufwuchs, growth
- Aurochs (Modern German: Auerochse), urus
- Bauplan, body plan of animals
- Bereitschaftspotential, readiness potential
- Edelweiss, German spelling Edelweiß, Leontopodium alpinum
- Einkorn, Triticum boeoticum or Triticum monococcum, a type of wheat
- Krummholz, crooked or bent wood due to growth conditions of trees and bushes
- Lagerstätte, repository; sedimentary deposit rich in fossils
- Lammergeier or lammergeyer (German: Lämmergeier, also Bartgeier), the bearded vulture
- Lampenflora, autotrophic lifeforms (algae) present in caves associated with permanently installed lighting
- Marmorkrebs, the marbled crayfish
- Molosser, a type of dog, literally "Molossian", from Molossus, the name of an ancient dog breed which the modern molossers descend from
- Oberhäutchen (often written oberhautchen in newer literature), the outermost layer of reptile skin; literally "small top skin" (Häutchen is the diminutive of Haut, the German word for "skin")
- Schreckstoff (lit. "scare stuff"), a chemical alarm signal emitted by fish
- Spitzenkörper, structure important in hyphal growth
- Spreite, laminae found in trace fossils, going back to animal burrows
- Umwelt, German for "environment", the subjective internal experiences of an animal as shaped by their sensory abilities and nervous system
- Unkenreflex, a defensive posture adopted by several branches of the amphibian class
- Urvogel, a common name for Archaeopteryx
- Waldsterben, forest dieback
- Zeitgeber (chronobiology), external clue that helps to synchronize the internal body clock
- Zugunruhe (ornithology), pre-migration anxiety in birds and other migratory animals

=== Chemistry ===
- Aufbau principle (physical chemistry) (German spelling: Aufbauprinzip)
- Bismuth, chemical element
- Darmstadtium, synthetic chemical element
- Einsteinium, synthetic chemical element
- Entgegen and its opposite zusammen (organic chemistry)
- Gemisch (chemistry: a randomized mixture of components)
- Gerade and its opposite ungerade (quantum mechanics)
- Knallgas, gaseous mixture
- Kugelrohr, distillation apparatus
- Meitnerium, synthetic chemical element
- Mischmetall (lit. "mixed metal"), alloy
- Roentgenium, synthetic chemical element
- Umpolung, polarity inversion (organic chemistry)
- Wolfram, chemical element, also known as Tungsten
- Zwitterion, also called inner salt or dipolar ion

=== Chess ===
- Allumwandlung, German for "complete promotion"
- Blitz chess, from German Blitzschach, literally "lightning chess", also known as Fast chess
- Fingerfehler, slip of the finger
- Kibitz, from German Kiebitzer, a spectator making comments on the game that can be heard by the players
- Patzer, German for "weak chess player", literally "blunder"
- Sitzfleisch, patience during slow play
- Zeitnot, time pressure
- Zugzwang, compulsion to move
- Zwischenzug, in-between move

=== Economics ===
- Dollar (German Thaler, Czech: tolar), from Joachimsthal (Czech: Jáchymov), name for the silver coin minted in Bohemia in the 16th century in Joachimsthal (through Dutch (Rijks)daalder)
- Energiewende, stands for Energy transition
- Freigeld, "free money"
- Freihandel, "free trade"
- Freiland, "free land"
- Freiwirtschaft, "free economy"
- Hacksilber, a type of commodity money
- Heller (German also Häller), from Hall am Kocher, name for the coin
- K: In economics, the letter K, from the German word Kapital, is used to denote Capital
- Luftgeschäft (Yiddish: לופט געשעפט; may also be written as Luftgeschaeft or Luftgescheft), literally "air business", an unstable business or an unproductive profession.
- Lumpenproletariat
- Mittelstand
- Notgeld, "emergency money" or "necessity money"
- Takt
- Wirtschaftswunder

=== Geography ===
- Hinterland
- Inselberg
- Knickpoint (German Knickpunkt, from knicken "to bend sharply, fold, kink"), a point where the slope of a river changes suddenly
- Massenerhebung effect
- Mitteleuropa
- Mittelgebirge
- Schlatt (also Flatt; from Low German)
- Steilhang (steep slope or face)
- Thalweg (written "Talweg" in modern German)

=== Geology ===
- Aufeis, sheets of layered ice formed from groundwater discharge or upwelling of river water behind ice dams during freezing temperatures
- Bergschrund
- Dreikanter
- Druse, an incrustation of small crystals on the surface of a rock or mineral
- Fenster, also known as a window, a geologic structure formed by erosion or normal faulting on a thrust system
- Firn
- Flysch
- Gneiss (German Gneis)
- Graben
- Horst
- Karst
- Loess (German: Löss)
- Randkluft, gap between the rock face and the side of the glacier
- Rille (German: "groove"), a type of feature of the surface of the Moon
- Sturzstrom
- Urstrom, a large glacial age river in Northern Europe
- Urstromtal

Minerals including:

- Feldspar (German Feldspat)
- Hornblende
- Meerschaum
- Moldavite (German Moldavit), from Moldau (Czech: Vltava)
- Quartz (German Quarz)
- Wolframite (German Wolframit)
- Zinnwaldite (German Zinnwaldit), from Zinnwald (Czech: Cínovec)

=== History ===
(Some terms are listed in multiple categories if they are important to each.)

==== Other historical periods ====
- Alltagsgeschichte, literally "everyday history" a type of microhistory
- Aufklarung, in German: Aufklärung, "enlightenment", short for Zeitalter der Aufklärung, "age of enlightenment"
- Biedermeier, era in early 19th century Germany
- Chaoskampf (mythology)
- Diktat
- Gründerzeit, the period in German history of great artistic and economic developments
- Junker
- Kaiser, "emperor" (derived from the title "Caesar")
- Kleinstaaterei, the territorial fragmentation of Germany in the early modern period
- Kulturgeschichte
- Kulturkampf, literally the 'struggle for culture'; Otto von Bismarck's campaign for secularity which mostly went against Catholics in the newly formed German state, ostensibly a result of Bismarck's suspicion of Catholic loyalty
- Kulturkreis, a theory in anthropology and ethnology
- Kulturkugel, literally "culture bullet" or "cultural bullet", a neologism coined by archaeologist J. P. Mallory for his model of cultural diffusion
- Landflucht
- Landnahme
- Nordpolitik
- Ostflucht
- Ostpolitik
- Ostalgie (nostalgia for the former Eastern Bloc, specifically for the GDR)
- Perserschutt, "Persian rubble", sculptures that were damaged by the invading Persian army on the Acropolis of Athens in 480 BC
- Quellenforschung, "research of sources", the study of the sources of, or influences upon, a literary work
- Regenbogenschüsselchen, a type of prehistoric gold coin of the Celtic Iron Age
- Realpolitik (political science: "real politics"); usually implies the way politics really works, i.e. via the influence of power and money, rather than a principled approach that the public might expect to be aligned with a party's or nation's values, or rather than a political party's given interpretation.
- Reichstag (Imperial Diet; see Reichstag building, Imperial Diet, Reichstag, and the Reichstag of the Weimar Republic)
- Sammlungspolitik
- Sippe, an ancient Germanic clan
- Urmonotheismus
- Urreligion
- Völkerschlacht – the "Battle of the Nations" (that is, the Battle of Leipzig, 1813)
- Völkerwanderung – the migration (and invasions) of the Germanic peoples in the 4th century
- Weltpolitik – the politics of global domination; contemporarily, "the current climate in global politics".
- Wunderkammer, a cabinet of curiosities

=== Military terms ===
- Blitzkrieg (literally "lightning war")
- Flak (Flugabwehrkanone), anti-aircraft gun (for derived meanings see under Other aspects of everyday life)
- Fliegerhorst, another word for a military airport (Horst = predator bird's nest)
- Karabiner, a carbine (a firearm). For the climbing hardware, see carabiner above
- Kriegsspiel, in English also written Kriegspiel, war game (different meanings)
- Luftwaffe, air force (since WW II, with East Germany and the earlier German Empire using the term Luftstreitkräfte instead for their air services)
- Panzer refers to tanks and other armored military vehicles, or formations of such vehicles
- Panzerfaust, "tank fist": anti-tank weapon, a small one-man launcher and projectile.
- Strafe, punishment, extracted from the slogan Gott strafe England (May God punish England)
- U-Boot (abbreviated form of Unterseeboot – submarine, but commonly called U-Boot in Germany as well)
- Vernichtungsgedanke (thought of annihilation)

=== Linguistics ===
- Ablaut
- Abstandsprache
- Aktionsart
- Ausbausprache
- Dachsprache
- Dreimorengesetz, "three-mora law", the rule for placing stress in Latin
- Grammatischer Wechsel, "grammatical alternation", a pattern of consonant alternations found in Germanic strong verbs and also in Germanic nouns
- Junggrammatiker, literally "Young Grammarians", a formative German school of linguists in the late 19th century
- Lallname, a pet name based on baby talk, especially in ancient languages of Asia Minor
- Loanword (ironically not a loanword but rather a calque from German Lehnwort)
- Mischsprache, mixed language
- Primärberührung, "primary contact", the development of certain consonant clusters (stop consonant + /t/) in Proto-Germanic
- Rückumlaut, "reverse umlaut", a regular pattern of vowel alternation (of independent origin from usual ablaut patterns) in a small number of Germanic weak verbs
- Sitz im Leben (Biblical linguistics mainly; the study of pragmatics has a similar approach)
- Sprachbund, "speech bond" or"language union", a sociolinguistic term for a group of languages that have become similar because of geographical proximity
- Sprachgefühl, the intuitive sense of what is appropriate in a language
- Sprachraum
- Stammbaumtheorie, the tree model of descendance in historical linguistics; also Stammbaum alone, for a phylogenetical tree of languages
- Suffixaufnahme
- Umlaut
- Urheimat, "original homeland", the area originally inhabited by speakers of a (reconstructed) proto-language
- Ursprache, "proto-language"
- Verschärfung, "sharpening", several analogous phonetic changes in Gothic, North Germanic and modern Faroese
- Wanderwort, "migratory term/word", a word which spreads from its original language into several others
- Winkelhaken, a basic element in the ancient cuneiform script

=== Literature ===
- Bildungsroman, a form of coming-of-age story
- Chaoskampf, "struggle against chaos", a recurring motif in myth and legend
- Knittelvers, a form of poetry using rhyming couplets
- Künstlerroman, a novel about an artist's growth to maturity
- Leitmotiv, a recurring theme
- Leitwortstil, a phrase repeated to reinforce a theme
- Nihilartikel, a fake entry in a reference work
- Sammelband, a set of manuscripts later bound together
- Quellenkritik, source criticism
- Sturm und Drang, an 18th-century literary movement; "storm and stress" in English, although the literal translation is closer to "storm and urge".
- Urtext, "original text"
- Vorlage, original or mastercopy of a text on which derivates are based
- Q, abbreviation for Quelle ("source"), a postulated lost document in Biblical criticism

=== Mathematics and formal logic ===
- Ansatz (lit. "set on", roughly equivalent to "approach" or "where to begin", a starting assumption) – one of the most-used German loan words in the English-speaking world of science.
- "Eigen-" in composita such as eigenfunction, eigenvector, eigenvalue, eigenform; in English "self-" or "own-". They are related concepts in the fields of linear algebra and functional analysis.
- Entscheidungsproblem
- Grossencharakter (German spelling: Größencharakter)
- Hauptmodul (the generator of a modular curve of genus 0)
- Hauptvermutung
- Hilbert's Nullstellensatz (without apostrophe in German)
- Ideal (originally ideale Zahlen, defined by Ernst Kummer)
- Krull's Hauptidealsatz (without apostrophe in German)
- Möbius band (German: Möbiusband)
- Positivstellensatz
- quadratfrei
- Vierergruppe (also known as Klein four-group)
- $\mathbb{Z}$ from (ganze) Zahlen ((whole) numbers), the integers
- $\mathbb{K}$ from Körper ("field"), used for one of the two basic fields $\mathbb{R}$ or $\mathbb{C}$ not specifying which one

=== Medicine ===
- Anwesenheit
- Apallisches syndrome, from German apallisches Syndrom
- Diener, autopsy assistant
- Entgleisen
- Gedankenlautwerden
- Gegenhalten
- Kernicterus (German spelling: Kernikterus)
- Kleeblattschädel
- LSD, German abbreviation of "Lysergsäurediethylamid"
- Mitgehen
- Mitmachen
- Mittelschmerz ("middle pain", used to refer to ovulation pain)
- Pfropfschizophrenie
- Rinderpest
- Schnauzkrampf
- Sensitiver Beziehungswahn
- Sitz bath, from German Sitzbad
- Spinnbarkeit
- Verstimmung
- Vorbeigehen
- Vorbeireden
- Wahneinfall
- Witzelsucht
- Wurgstimme

=== Philosophy ===
- An sich, "in itself"
- Aufhebung, sublation in dialectics
- Dasein
- Ding an sich, "thing in itself" from Kant
- Geist, mind, spirit or ghost
- Gott ist tot!, a popular phrase from Nietzsche; more commonly rendered "God is dead!" in English.
- Übermensch, also from Nietzsche; the ideal of a Superhuman or Overman.
- Weltanschauung, calqued into English as "world view"; a comprehensive view or personal philosophy of human life and the universe
- Welträtsel, "world riddle", a term associated with Nietzsche and biologist Ernst Haeckel concerning the nature of the universe and the meaning of life
- Wille zur Macht, "the will to power", central concept of Nietzsche's philosophy

=== Physical sciences ===
- Ansatz, an assumption for a function that is not based on an underlying theory
- Antiblockiersystem
- Bremsstrahlung (lit. "brake radiation"), electromagnetic radiation emitted from charge particles stopping suddenly
- Dunkelflaute, a period of time in which little to no energy can be generated with the use of wind and solar power
- Durchmusterung, the search for celestial objects, especially a survey of stars
- Farbzentrum (Solid-state physics)
- Foehn wind, also "foehn" (German spelling Föhn), a warm wind which sometimes appears on the northern side of the Alps in south Germany and Austria
- Fusel alcohol (German: Fuselalkohol), from German Fusel, which refers to low-quality liquor
- Gedanken experiment (German spelling: Gedankenexperiment); more commonly referred to as a "thought experiment" in English
- Gegenschein, a faint brightening of the night sky in the region of the antisolar point
- Gerade and its opposite ungerade (quantum mechanics)
- Graupel, a form of precipitation
- Heiligenschein (lit. "halo")
- Hohlraum, a radiation cavity used in thermonuclear weapons design
- Kirchweger-Kondensationseinrichtung
- Kugelblitz (the German term for ball lightning), in theoretical physics: a concentration of light so intense that it forms an event horizon and becomes self-trapped
- Rocks and minerals like Quartz (German spelling: Quarz), Gneiss and Feldspar (originally Gneis and Feldspat respectively), Meerschaum
- Reststrahlen (lit. "residual rays")
- Schiefspiegler, special type of telescope
- Schlieren (from German Schliere for "streak"), inhomogeneities in transparent material
- Sollbruchstelle, predetermined breaking point
- Spiegeleisen
- Trommel
- Umklapp process (German spelling: Umklappprozess)
- Vierbein, and variations such as vielbein, in general relativity
- Zitterbewegung

=== Politics ===
- Befehl ist Befehl, "an order is an order"
- Berufsverbot
- Kritik, a type of argument in policy debates
- Lumpenproletariat
- Machtpolitik, power politics
- Putsch, overthrow of those in power by a small group, coup d'état. (Although commonly understood and used in contemporary High German, too, the word putsch originates from Swiss German and is etymologically related to English "push".)
- Realpolitik, "politics of reality": foreign politics based on practical concerns rather than ideology or ethics.
- Rechtsstaat, concept of a state based on law and human rights
- Siegerjustiz
- Überfremdung
- Vergangenheitsbewältigung

=== Psychology ===
- Aha-Erlebnis (lit. "aha experience"), a sudden insight or epiphany, compare eureka
- Angst, feeling of fear, but more deeply and without concrete object
- Eigengrau (lit. "intrinsic grey") or also Eigenlicht (lit. "intrinsic light"), the colour seen by the eye in perfect darkness
- Einstellung effect, from Einstellung, which means "attitude" here
- Ganzfeld effect, from German Ganzfeld (lit. "complete field"), a phenomenon of visual perception
- Gestalt psychology (German spelling: Gestaltpsychologie), holistic psychology
- Gestaltzerfall (lit. "shape decomposition"), a kind of visual agnosia where a complex, holistic shape (Gestalt) dissolves into its parts for the perceiver
- Haltlose personality disorder, from haltlos (lit. "without grip"), aimless
- Merkwelt, "way of viewing the world", "peculiar individual consciousness"
- Schadenfreude, gloating, a malicious satisfaction obtained from the misfortunes of others
- Sehnsucht, a yearning for an ideal alternative
- Sorge, a state of worry, but (like Angst) in a less concrete, more general sense, worry about the world, one's future, etc.
- Umwelt, environment, literally: "surrounding world"; in semiotics, "self-centred world"
- Völkerpsychologie (lit. "folk psychology"), a 19th-20th century cultural-social psychology framework associated with Wilhelm Wundt
- Weltschmerz (lit. "world-pain"), a deep feeling of sadness experienced by someone who believes that physical reality can never satisfy the demands of the mind
- Wunderkind (lit. "wonder child"), child prodigy
- Zeitgeber (lit. "time-giver"), something that resets the circadian clock found in the suprachiasmatic nucleus

=== Sociology ===
- Gemeinschaft, community
- Gesellschaft, society
- Herrschaft, reign
- Männerbund, elite male society
- Verstehen, lit. "understanding", interpretive or participatory examination of social phenomena
- Zeitgeist, spirit of the times or age

=== Theology ===
- Gattung, genre
- Kunstprosa, artistic prose
- Sitz im Leben (setting in life, context)

== German terms mostly used for literary effect ==
There are a few terms which are recognised by many English speakers but are usually only used to deliberately evoke a German context:

- Autobahn – particularly common in British English and American English referring specifically to German motorways.
- Achtung – lit. "attention"
- Frau and Fräulein – woman and young woman or girl, respectively, in English. Indicating marital state, with Frau – Mrs. and Fräulein – Miss; in Germany, however, the diminutive Fräulein lapsed from common usage in the late 1960s. Regardless of marital status, a woman is now commonly referred to as Frau, because from 1972 the term Fräulein has been officially phased out for being politically incorrect and should only be used if expressly authorized by the woman concerned.
- Führer (umlaut is usually dropped in English) – always used in English to denote Hitler or to connote a fascistic leader – never used, as is possible in German, to straightforwardly denote a (non-fascist) leader or guide (e.g. Bergführer: mountain guide, Stadtführer: city guide [book], Führerschein: driving licence, Geschäftsführer: managing director, Flugzeugführer: Pilot in command)
- Gott mit uns – meaning "God be with us", the motto of the Prussian king was used as a morale slogan amongst soldiers in both World Wars. It was bastardized as "Got mittens" by American and British soldiers, and is usually used nowadays, because of the German defeat in both wars, derisively to mean that wars are not won on religious grounds.
- Hände hoch – "hands up"
- Herr – in modern German either the equivalent of Mr. (Mister), to address an adult man, or "master" over something or someone (e.g. Sein eigener Herr sein: to be his own master). Derived from the adjective hehr, meaning "honourable" or "senior", it was historically a nobleman's title, equivalent to "Lord". (Herr der Fliegen is the German title of Lord of the Flies.) In a religious context it refers to God.
- Ich bin ein Berliner – famous quotation by John F. Kennedy
- Leitmotif (German spelling: Leitmotiv) – any sort of recurring theme, whether in music, literature, or the life of a fictional character or a real person.
- Meister – used as a suffix to mean expert (Maurermeister) or master; in Germany it means also champion in sports (Weltmeister, Europameister, Landesmeister)
- Nein – no
- Raus – meaning Out! – shortened (colloquial) (depending on where the speaker is, if on the inside "get out!" = hinaus, if on the outside "come out!" = heraus). It is the imperative form of the German verb hinausgehen (getting out (of a room/house/etc.)) as in the imperative gehen Sie raus!).
- Reich – from the Middle High German rich, as a noun it means "empire" or "realm", cf. the English word bishopric. In titles as part of a compound noun, for example Deutsche Reichsbahn, it is equivalent to the English word "national" or possibly federal (the words "Reich" and "Bund" are somewhat exchangeable in recent history, with the exception of the Nazi state which continued to call itself Reich despite abolishing states). For instance Reichsbahn ([German] National/Federal Railway), or Reichspost (National/Federal Postal Service), specifically indicating in either case that the respective institutions were organised by central authority (called the German Reich at the time), not the states. To some English – and German – speakers, Reich in English strongly connotes Nazism and is sometimes used to suggest fascism or authoritarianism, e.g. "Herr Reichsminister" used as a title for a disliked politician.
- Ja – yes
- Jawohl – a German term that connotes an emphatic yes – "Yes, indeed!" in English. It is often equated to "yes, sir" in Anglo-American military films, since it is also a term typically used as an acknowledgement for military commands in the German military.
- Schnell! – "Quick!" or "Quickly!"
- Kommandant – commander (in the sense of person in command or commanding officer, regardless of military rank), used often in the military in general (Standortkommandant: base commander), on battleships and U-boats (Schiffskommandant or U-Boot-Kommandant), sometimes used on civilian ships and aircraft.
- Wunderbar – wonderful

== Terms rarely used in English ==
- Ampelmännchen
- Besserwisser – someone who always "knows better"
- Bockmist, lit. "billy goat's dung", meaning "nonsense" or "rubbish"
- Eierlegende Wollmilchsau – literally "egg-laying wool-milk-sow", a hypothetical solution, object or person fulfilling unrealistically many different demands; also referring sometimes to a (really existing) object, concept or person like this, for example a multi-tool or exceptionally versatile person (jack of all trades)
- Fahrvergnügen – "driving pleasure"; introduced in a Volkswagen advertising campaign
- Fremdscham, "vicarious shame", the shame felt for the behavior of someone else
- Gastarbeiter – "guest worker", foreign-born worker
- Geisterfahrer – "ghost driver", a wrong-way driver; one who drives in the direction opposite to that prescribed for the given lane.
- Götterdämmerung – "Twilight of the Gods", a disastrous conclusion of events (also a music drama by Richard Wagner)
- Kobold – small mischievous fairy creature, traditionally translated as "goblin", "hobgoblin" or "imp"
- Ordnung muss sein – "There must be order." This proverbial phrase illustrates the importance that German culture places upon order.
- Schmutz – smut, dirt, filth
- ... über alles – "above all", originally from "Deutschland über alles", the first line of Hoffmann von Fallersleben's poem "Das Lied der Deutschen" (The Song of the Germans); see also Über alles (disambiguation).
- Verschlimmbessern – to make something worse in an honest but failed attempt to improve it
- Vorsprung durch Technik – "competitive edge through technology", used in an advertising campaign by Audi
- Zweihänder – two-handed sword

== German quotations used in English ==
Some famous English quotations are translations from German. On rare occasions an author will quote the original German as a sign of erudition.

- Muss es sein? Es muss sein!: "Must it be? It must be!" – Beethoven
- Der Krieg ist eine bloße Fortsetzung der Politik mit anderen Mitteln: "War is politics by other means" (literally: "War is a mere continuation of politics by other means") – Clausewitz: "Vom Kriege", Book I, Chapter 1, Section 24
- Ein Gespenst geht um in Europa – das Gespenst des Kommunismus: "A spectre is haunting Europe – the spectre of communism" – The Communist Manifesto
- Proletarier aller Länder, vereinigt euch!: "Workers of the world, unite!" – The Communist Manifesto
- Gott würfelt nicht: "God does not play dice" – Einstein
- Raffiniert ist der Herrgott, aber boshaft ist er nicht: "Subtle is the Lord, but malicious He is not" – Einstein
- Wir müssen wissen, wir werden wissen: "We must know, we will know" – David Hilbert
- Was kann ich wissen? Was soll ich tun? Was darf ich hoffen? Was ist der Mensch?: "What can I know? What shall I do? What may I hope? What is Man?" – Kant: Kritik der praktischen Vernunft
- Die ganzen Zahlen hat der liebe Gott gemacht, alles andere ist Menschenwerk: "God made the integers, all the rest is the work of man" – Leopold Kronecker
- Hier stehe ich, ich kann nicht anders. Gott helfe mir. Amen!: "Here I stand, I cannot do differently. God help me. Amen!" – attributed to Martin Luther
- Wovon man nicht sprechen kann, darüber muss man schweigen: "Whereof one cannot speak, thereof one must be silent" – Wittgenstein
- Einmal ist keinmal: "What happens once might as well never have happened." literally "once is never" – a common German phrase and the theme of The Unbearable Lightness of Being by Milan Kundera
- Es lebe die Freiheit: "Long live freedom" – Hans Scholl
- Arbeit macht frei: "Labour creates freedom" literally "work makes (you) free" – A phrase written over the entranceway of extermination camps in the Holocaust.

== See also ==
- Germanism (linguistics)
- List of pseudo-German words adapted to English
- List of English words of Dutch origin
- List of English words of Yiddish origin
- Anglish
- Denglisch
- Yinglish
