= Wunderbar =

Wunderbar may refer to:

== General ==
- Wunderbar, a German expression used in English which means "wonderful"
- Wunderbar (bar), a queer bar in Syracuse, New York
- Wunderbar (chocolate bar), a chocolate bar sold in Canada and Germany
- Wunderbar Films, an Indian film production company

== Music ==
- "Wünderbar", a 1981 song by British punk band Tenpole Tudor
- "Wunderbar", a song from the Cole Porter musical Kiss Me, Kate
- "Wunderbar", a song released by German writer Christiane F. under the name "Sentimentale Jugend"
- "Wunderbar" (Concerto In Koch Minor), a bonus track on album Lil' Beethoven by the band Sparks
- Wunderbar (Patrizio Buanne album), 2012
- Wunderbar (The Living End album), 2018

== Film ==
- "Wonder Bar", a 1934 musical movie by Lloyd Bacon and Busby Berkeley
