= Plandampf =

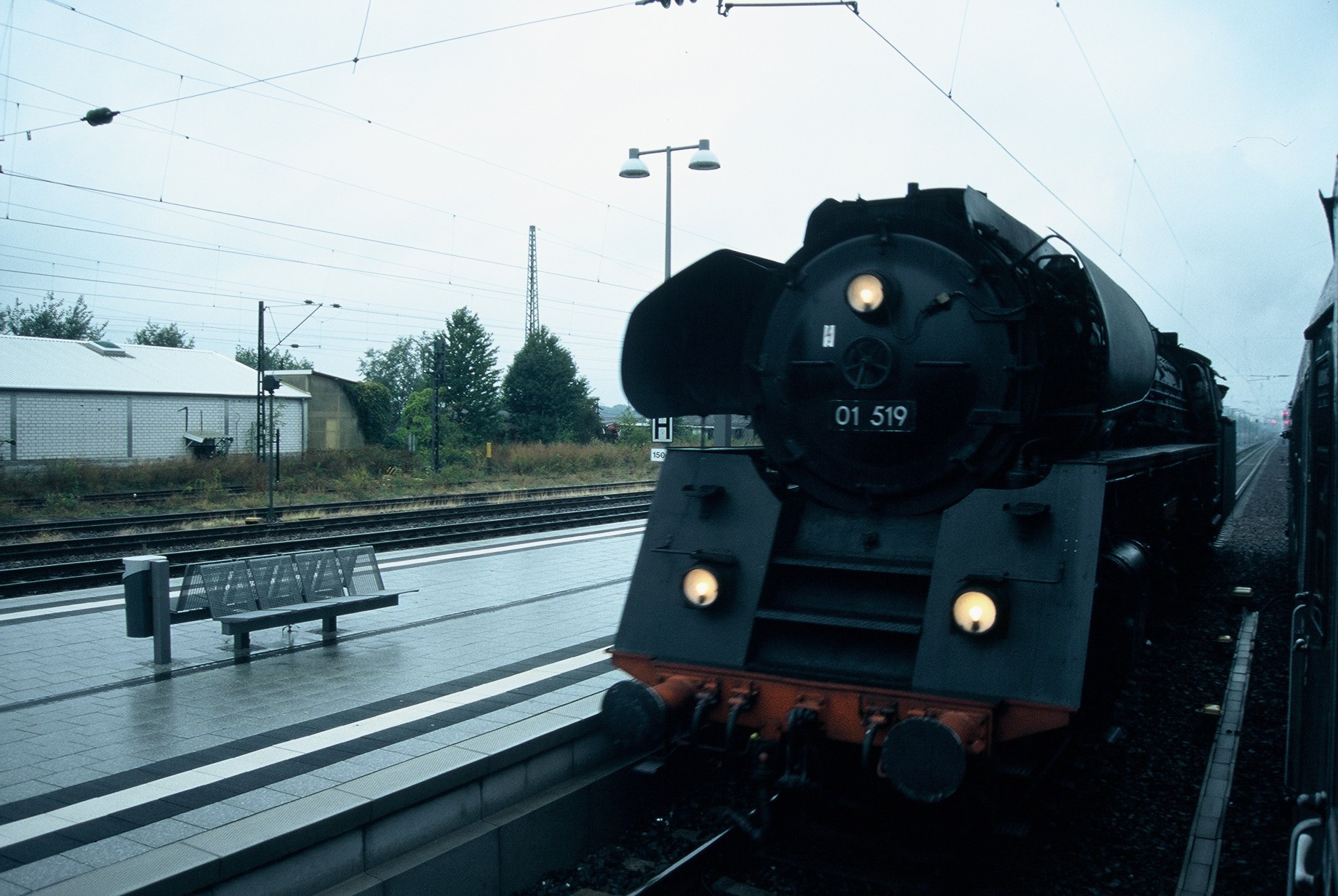
Steam locomotive 01 519 at Plandampf 2005 in Schifferstadt

Plandampf (German for schedule steam) means the hauling of regular trains by steam locomotives, often in conjunction with rolling stock of the same era. The idea came into being in (West) Germany in the late 1980s, after the Deutsche Bundesbahn had abandoned the use of steam engines in 1977, and effectively had them banned from their rails with the de:Dampflokverbot, applied also for Sonderzug chartered trains. The intention was to portray DB as a modern, fast and clean enterprise aiming for electrification, rather than the slow and dirty choo-choo-train of old. Thus, privately operated small lines were not affected. With the 150th anniversary of German Railways coming up in 1985, the steam engines were partially readmitted. In the German Democratic Republic (East Germany), which had to rely more on coal and lignite, steam was phased out by Deutsche Reichsbahn in 1988, shortly before unification in 1990.

At the beginning, only the additional costs for the steam service were to be borne by the operator. The background was that there were still many operable steam locomotives on the territory of the former GDR, the infrastructure (e.g. sheds, water cranes, coal handling systems, sanding systems) was still in place on many lines, and the usually low maximum speed permitted the use of steam locomotives.

Scheduled steam events are becoming increasingly rare because the necessary infrastructure for steam operation is being lost in the course of modernization of routes. The planned steam at the beginning of the 1990s in East Germany was still relatively common. After modernization, train speeds increased, and the timetable was designed accordingly, so steam locomotives could not meet the speed requirements. Another factor was stricter safety requirements, such as automatic closing of doors.

Most planned steam events involve passenger trains but there are also a few freight workings. In southern Germany, the Bavarian Railway Museum (BEM) established itself as a scheduled steam operator from 2016. It has its own railway line, and has a stock of sufficiently large locomotives (BR 01, BR 44, BR 50, S 3/6 and BR52), its own route and customers with suitable freight volumes.
