= Wunderbar (bar) =

Queer bar in Syracuse, New York

- Interactive map of Wunderbar
- Address: 201 South West Street
- Location: Syracuse, New York
- Coordinates: 43°2′55″N 76°9′31″W

Wunderbar was a queer bar and theater situated in downtown Syracuse that provided a safe haven for the LGBTQ+ community in the surrounding area. Tanner Efinger, the owner of Wunderbar, fostered this space by presenting a multitude of programming representing individual queer communities and being able to cater to the various wants and needs of the queer community in Syracuse.

== History ==
On April 20, 2018, Wunderbar opened their doors to the Syracuse community in Armory Square. Their space could be used for a combination of events centered around representing the queer community and celebrating the arts in the Syracuse area. During their first year open, Wunderbar primarily generated their profits from hosting dance parties and securing event rentals.

In March 2020, Wunderbar temporarily closed following the signing of the "New York State on PAUSE" executive order by the governor of New York. Part of this executive order stated that all non-essential businesses, such as bars, would need to close as of 8PM on March 22, 2020. In order to avoid waste, the establishment offered growlers of pre-tapped beer, and perishable goods were donated to ACR Health, a local non-profit and community-based health services provider. Employees were promised reemployment at the earliest opportunity before being let go, and the community rallied behind the bar by contributing to their GoFundMe campaign, ensuring essential groceries for the staff. Wunderbar distributed a collective sum of $2000 to their employees in Wegmans gift cards over a span of four weeks. During each month of their three-month-long closure due to the global pandemic, Wunderbar faced a staggering loss of more than six thousand dollars in rent and utilities alone, excluding additional expenses such as goods and unforeseen costs.

After the landlord sold the building, Wunderbar temporarily closed again on November 1, 2023, and they are planning to relocate to a smaller space and reopen in 2025 in downtown Syracuse.

=== Mission ===
Wunderbar hopes to create an inclusive environment that promotes local queer artists and welcomes everyone, regardless of sexual orientation and gender identity. This establishment was named after "Wunderbar," which is the German word for wonderful. Efinger mentions that Wunderbar is not just a wonderful place, but also a place where you can come in and be full of wonder. This space can differ from a specific definition of what they are, but more spaces can be used, from a bar to a classroom to a gallery.

=== Programming ===
Wunderbar has hosted various events and activities within its space, utilizing its indoor and patio capabilities.

During their brief close in 2020, Wunderbar found a revenue source in a collaboration with Upstate Medical's PrEP Program, who had worked with them for CNY Pride the summer prior. Upstate Medical's PrEP Program agreed to sponsor Wunderbar De-Briefs, a series of Instagram Live videos aimed at providing sex education and other valuable information to the LGBTQ+ community amidst the quarantine. Some topics included "The Hanky Code: What's. Your Fetish", "Open Relationships Work!", "Indignity, Sexuality, and Resilience," and many others.

They have also hosted multiple theatrical performances. Breadcrumbs Production's “The Game of Life” is the most notable as a dark comedy immersive experience about societal constructs that includes the audience by allowing them to make choices. As founding artistic director of Breadcrumbs Production, which was launched in August 2016, Efinger wrote this parodical rendition of the classic board game and participated in the performance as well as it ran from November 17 to 19, 2023.

Other organizations were often invited to book the space for events, such as when Salt City Story Slam, a local story-telling organization, spoke on the topic of "coming out." Following Wunderbar's first spoken-word event in March 2019, they reached out to Michelle Stantial, one of the co-founders of Salt City Story Slam.

From drag shows to trivia and singles nights, Wunderbar covered a variety of programming to highlight the queer community. Themed nights were also a regular occurrence that celebrated specific communities within the LGBTQIA+.

== Community impact ==
Wunderbar has taken many actions to support their local queer community over the years. While most businesses close around the end-of-the-year holidays, especially on Christmas Eve, Efinger and his husband decided to keep Wunderbar open for those who needed a safe space. They recognized that the holiday season can be tough on some people in the LGBTQ+ community, and when people did show up, it became a tradition to stay open on Christmas Eve.

They also have actively worked to spread knowledge and education about the LGBTQ+ community. When social distancing began as a result of the COVID-19 pandemic, Wunderbar replaced their more lush and cozy furniture for more practical tables and chairs to make it easier for small parties to keep to their own spaces. With this change, they implemented an educational and empowering system in which each table had a plaque connected to a historical LGBTQ+ figure. Beginning in February 2023, Wunderbar teamed up with Syracuse Kung Fu to host an empowering self-defense class for queer individuals in response to the rise of queer violence earlier that year.

They also had a donation-based library of queer books, open to the public as a community resource.
