= Burgwall =

Burgwall is a word of Germanic origin, literally meaning "fort rampart", and may refer to:

- Gord (archaeology), a typical Slavic settlement type of the High Middle Ages, sometimes called a Slavic burgwall
- Burgwall, the local term for a pre- and early historic hillfort in the non-Slavic areas of Central Europe
- Burgwall, a village in the borough of Zehdenick in Oberhavel district, Germany

== See also ==
- Wallburg (disambiguation)
