= Sitzprobe =

Rehearsal where the singers sing with the orchestra

In opera and musical theatre, a Sitzprobe (German: [ˈzɪtspʁoːbə], 'seated rehearsal') is a rehearsal where the singers sing with the orchestra, focusing attention on integrating the two groups. It is often the first rehearsal where the orchestra and singers rehearse together. The equivalent Italian term is prova all'italiana.

Such a rehearsal where performers stand and do minor blocking is known as a Wandelprobe.
