= Liederkranz =

Liederkranz may refer to:

- A German-language choir, formerly for men only
- Liederkranz (Grand Island, Nebraska), U.S., a historic building
- Liederkranz cheese, an American variety of Limburger cheese
- Liederkranz of the City of New York, a German-American cultural society
