= Lists of English words by country or language of origin =

The following are lists of words in the English language that are known as "loanwords" or "borrowings", which are derived from other languages.

For Old English-derived words, see List of English words of Old English origin.

- English words of African origin
- List of English words of Afrikaans origin
  - List of South African English regionalisms
  - List of South African slang words
- List of English words from Indigenous languages of the Americas
- List of English words of Arabic origin
  - List of Arabic star names
- List of English words of Australian Aboriginal origin
- List of English words of Celtic origin
  - List of English words of Brittonic origin
  - List of English words of Gaulish origin
  - List of English words of Irish origin
  - List of English words of Scottish Gaelic origin
  - List of English words of Welsh origin
- List of English words of Chinese origin
- List of English words of Czech origin
- List of English words of Dravidian origin (Kannada, Malayalam, Tamil, Telugu)
- List of English words of Dutch origin
  - List of place names of Dutch origin
  - List of place names of Dutch origin in Australia
- List of English words of Etruscan origin
- List of English words of Finnish origin
- List of English words of French origin
  - Glossary of ballet, mostly French words
  - Glossary of French words and expressions in English
  - List of English words with dual French and Old English variations
  - List of pseudo-French words in English
  - List of English Latinates of Germanic origin
- List of German expressions in English
  - List of pseudo-German words in English
- English words of Greek origin (a discussion rather than a list)
  - List of Greek morphemes used in English
- List of English words of Hawaiian origin
- List of English words of Hebrew origin
- List of English words of Hindi or Urdu origin
- List of English words of Hungarian origin
- List of English words of Indian origin
- List of English words of Indonesian origin, including from Javanese, Malay (Sumatran) Sundanese, Papuan (West Papua), Balinese, Dayak and other local languages in Indonesia
  - List of Irish words used in the English language
- List of English words of Italian origin
  - List of Italian musical terms used in English
- List of English words of Japanese origin
- List of English words of Korean origin
- List of Latin words with English derivatives
- List of English words of Malay origin
- List of English words of Māori origin
- List of English words of Niger-Congo origin
- List of English words of Old Norse origin
- List of English words of Persian origin
- List of English words of Philippine origin
- List of English words of Polish origin
- List of English words of Polynesian origin
- List of English words of Portuguese origin
- List of English words of Romani origin
- List of English words of Romanian origin
- List of English words of Russian origin
- List of English words of Sámi origin
- List of English words of Sanskrit origin
- List of English words of Scandinavian origin (incl. Danish, Norwegian)
- List of English words of Scots origin
- List of English words of Semitic origin
- List of English words of Spanish origin
- List of English words of Swedish origin
- List of English words of Turkic origin
- List of English words of Ukrainian origin
- List of English words of Yiddish origin
- List of English words of Zulu origin

== See also ==
- Anglicisation
- English terms with diacritical marks
- Inkhorn term
- Linguistic purism in English
- List of Germanic and Latinate equivalents in English
- List of Greek and Latin roots in English
- List of Irish words used in the English language
- List of proposed etymologies of OK
- List of Latin legal terms
