= List of English words of Hungarian origin =

This is a partial list of known or supposed Hungarian loanwords in English:

betyár
Typically horseback outlaws or highwayman in the Kingdom of Hungary primarily in the 19th Century, gaining legendary status.
biro
From László Bíró, the Hungarian inventor of the ballpoint pen. Bíró originally means judge.
borvíz, gyógyvíz and savanyúvíz
Gyógyvíz is mineral water perceived to have medical, healing or therapeutic effects, while its sparkling variety is called borvíz.
charda
A traditional roadside tavern or pension, often associated with the culture of the lowlands and the betyár era.
coach
From kocsi, a horse‐drawn wagon with springs above the axles. Named after the village of Kocs in which this type of vehicle was invented. The verb 'to coach' is also derived from this root.
czardas
From csárdás, a Hungarian folk dance. Csárda also means 'tavern'.
Dobos torte or Dobosh
From Dobos torta, "Dobos cake". After confectioner József C. Dobos. Dobos originally means drummer.
fogas
An Eastern European species of fish (Sander lucioperca), cf. zander.
forint
The currency of Hungary since 1946 (also between 1325-1553 and 1750–1892). Originally derived from Italian "fiorino," name of the Florentine currency. Cognate with English "florin" (see also pengő).
friska
From friss, a fast section of music, often associated with czardas dances (cf. lassan). But the Hungarian friss comes from the German frisch, in general with the same meaning (fresh).
goulash
From gulyás, a type of stew known in Hungarian as gulyás. In Hungary, 'gulyásleves' is a soup dish; leves meaning soup. Gulyás also means 'herdsman' dealing with cattle, as the noun gulya is the Hungarian word for cattle herd. (This can cause confusion with native Hungarian speakers, as Hungarians generally understand unqualified "gulyás" to mean "gulyásleves", the soup, instead of referring to the international goulash as "pörkölt".)
hajduk
From hajdúk, "bandits" (plural of hajdú). Outlaw, guerilla fighter. The original Hungarian meaning was "cattle drover".
halászlé
or Fisherman's Soup, a hot and spicy river fish soup with much paprika. (The actual Hungarian halászlé is not always made with hot paprika, unlike the internationally known soup.)
hussar
From Hungarian huszár, a light cavalry soldier. The Hungarian word originally meant "freebooter" and was further derived via Old Serbian husar, gusar, gursar ("pirate") from Italian corsaro ("pirate"), i.e. the same root as that of English corsair.
itsy-bitsy
Is sometimes linked to Hungarian ici-pici ("tiny") by popular sources, but is regarded as an unrelated English formation by English dictionaries.
kokosh
Adjective for a cake with chocolate or cocoa filling, particularly the kokosh cake a type of kalach
komondor
A big Hungarian breed of livestock guardian dog, looking like a big mop, always white.
kuvasz
A big Hungarian breed of shepherd dog, always white.
lassan
From lassú, "slowly". a slow section of music, often associated with czardas dances (cf. friska).
palatschinke or palacsinta
From palacsinta, a thin crêpe-like variety of pancake common in Central and Eastern Europe. Which in turn comes from Latin placenta (cake) via Romanian plăcintă (cake).
pandúr
Historic Central European light infantry and border patrol, later served as vármegye police force.
paprika
A spice produced from the ground, dried fruits of Capsicum annuum, a red pepper. Paprika in English refers to a powdered spice made of dried Capsicum of several sorts, though in Hungary it is the name of the fruit as well.
pengő
The currency of Hungary between 1925 and 1946 (cf. forint).
puli
A small Hungarian breed of shepherd dog, also looking like a mop, usually black or white.
pusta or puszta
From puszta, a kind of Hungarian steppe.
rezbanyite
a mineral (consisting of lead, copper, and bismuth sulfide), named after Rézbánya ("copper mine")
sabre (UK) or saber (US)
From French (sabre, sable), ultimately from an unknown source in a language of Eastern origin, possibly through Hungarian szablya.
shako or tsako
From csákó süveg, 'peaked cap', a stiff military hat with a high crown and plume.
Tengermellék
A seaside region which while not completely littoral, is habitat-wise, economically, culturally and politically coherent. Also used in Hungarian as an administrative division describing the latter, famously the Hungarian, Russian and Austrian.
tokaji or tokay
From tokaji aszú, the name of the wine from Tokaj, the centre of the local wine-growing district Tokaj-Hegyalja.
uzsonna
A light, informal meal typically eaten mid-afternoon, typically pastries, sandwiches or fruits.
vashegyite
A mineral (hydrated basic aluminum phosphate), named after Vashegy ("iron mountain"), the old Hungarian name for the village of Železník, Slovakia where it was discovered.
verbunkos
A Hungarian men's folk dance and musical style (itself coming from German Werbung - meaning "military recruitment" here).
vizsla or vizla
From vizsla, a Hungarian breed of hunting dog.

== See also ==
- Lists of English words of international origin
