= List of English words of Sámi origin =

English words of Sámi origin are relatively rare, having usually entered the English language via some other language.

== Words loaned to English ==
Some words specific to the Arctic environment have been loaned to English, specifically: (archaic) morse ('walrus') ← Sámi morša (via Slavic); and tundra ← Kildin Sámi tūnndra 'to the treeless plain' (via Russian). In Kildin Sámi, the word for tundra is tūndâr (tūnndra is in the illative case or the diminutive derivative). Words from Northern Sámi include Duodji, Sieidi and Yoik.

== See also ==
- List of English words of foreign origin
- List of English words of Finnish origin
- Uralic languages
