= List of English words of Romanian origin =

The English language has multiple loanwords from Romanian.

== Cuisine ==
- Brânză – A type of dairy product. Examples include Brânză de burduf, Brânză de vaci, Brânză de coșuleț, and Telemea.
- Mujdei – A spicy sauce.
- Plăcintă – Stuffed deep-fried pastry prepared with a variety of fillings such as cheese or apples
- Pastrami – A seasoned smoked cut of beef.

== Politics ==
- Conducător – A title used by Romanian dictator Ion Antonescu.
- Domnitor – The official title of the ruler of Romania between 1862 and 1881, equivalent to "Prince Regent".
- Paharnic – A historical Romanian rank.
- Mineriads – A series of violent protests in Bucharest during the 1990s.
- Sudiți – Inhabitants of the Danubian Principalities with legal immunity.

== Folklore and culture ==
- Caloian – A rainmaking ritual.
- Căpcăun – A mythical creature.
- Cimpoi - A Romanian bagpipe
- Dracula – The title of a book by Bram Stoker and the name of its titular character.
- Nai - A local pan flute made of reed
- Nosferatu – Synonymous with "vampire".
- Orlok – The name of a fictional vampire, derived from the word vǎrkolak.
- Sânziană – A type of fairy; also the name of plants in the genus Galium.
- Ursari – Romani animal trainers; bear-leaders.
- Vâlvă – Female spirits.
- Zmeu – A dragon-like creature.
- Zongora – A string instrument, borrowed from Hungarian zongora

== See also ==
- Lists of English words of international origin
