= List of pseudo-French words in English =

A pseudo-French expression in English is a word or expression in English that has the appearance of having been borrowed from French, but which in fact was created in English and does not exist in French. Several such French expressions have found a home in English. The first continued in its adopted language in its original obsolete form centuries after it had changed its form in national French:

- bon viveur – the second word is not used in French as such, while in English it often takes the place of a fashionable man, a sophisticate, a man used to elegant ways, a man-about-town, in fact a bon vivant
- double entendre
- epergne
- legerdemain (supposedly from, léger de main, literally, "light of hand") – sleight of hand, usually in the context of deception or the art of stage magic tricks.
- nom de plume – coined in the 19th century in English, on the pattern of nom de guerre, which is an actual French expression, where "nom de plume" is not. Since the 1970s, nom de plume is accepted as a valid French expression even if some authors view it as a calque of pen name.

== See also ==
- Calque
- False etymology
- False cognate
- False friend
- Folk etymology
- Glossary of French expressions in English
- Language transfer
- Lexical borrowing
- List of pseudo-German words adapted to English
- Loanword
- Phono-semantic matching
- Pseudo-anglicism
- Semantic change
