= Pseudo-anglicism =

Non-English word that appears to be English

A pseudo-anglicism is a word in another language that is formed from English elements and may appear to be English, but that does not exist as an English word with the same meaning.

For example, English speakers traveling in France may be struck by the "number of anglicisms—or rather words that look English—which are used in a different sense than they have in English, or which do not exist in English (such as rallye-paper, shake-hand, baby-foot, or baby-parc)".

This is different from a false friend, which is a word with a cognate that has a different main meaning; in some cases, pseudo-anglicisms become false friends.

== Definition and terminology ==
Pseudo-anglicisms are also called secondary anglicisms, false anglicisms, or pseudo-English.

Pseudo-anglicisms are a kind of lexical borrowing where the source or donor language is English, but where the borrowing is reworked in the receptor or recipient language.

The precise definition varies. Duckworth defines pseudo-anglicisms in German as "neologisms derived from English language material." Furiassi includes words that may exist in English with a "conspicuously different meaning".

== Typology and mechanism ==
Pseudo-anglicisms can be created in various ways, such as by archaism, (i.e. words that once had that meaning in English but have since been abandoned); semantic slide (where an English word is used to mean something different from its English meaning); conversion of existing words from one part of speech to another; or re-combinations by reshuffling English units.

Onysko speaks of two types: pseudo-anglicisms and hybrid anglicisms. The common factor is that each type represents a neologism in the receptor language resulting from a combination of borrowed lexical items from English. Using German as the receptor language, an example of the first type is Wellfit-Bar, a combination of two English lexical units to form a new term in German, which does not exist in English, and which carries the meaning, "a bar that caters to the needs of health-starved people." An example of the second type, is a hybrid based on a German compound word, Weitsprung (long jump), plus the English "coach", to create the new German word Weitsprung-Coach.

According to Filipović, pseudo-anglicisms can be formed through compounding, suffixation, or ellipsis. For example, the Serbo-Croatian word голман, golman was created from the English word goal, which the word man was added to. Alternatively, suffixes such as -ер, -er or -ист(а), -ist(a) may be added to an English word to create a new word in Serbo-Croatian, such as тенисер, teniser or ватерполист(а), vaterpolist(a). Ellipsis may also occur, wherein a component of an English word is dropped, such as the suffix -ing; examples include бокс, boks from boxing, or хепиенд, hepiend from happy ending.

Another process of word formation that can result in a pseudo-anglicism is a blend word, consisting of portions of two words, like brunch or smog. Rey-Debove & Gagnon attest tansad in French in 1919, from English tan[dem] + sad[dle].

== Scope ==
Pseudo-anglicisms can be found in many languages that have contact with English around the world, and are attested in nearly all European languages.

The equivalent of pseudo-anglicisms derived from languages other than English also exist. For example, the English-language phrase "double entendre", while often believed to be French and pronounced in a French fashion, is not actually used in French. For other examples, see dog Latin, list of pseudo-French words adapted to English, and list of pseudo-German words adapted to English.

== Examples ==
=== Many languages ===
Some pseudo-anglicisms are found in many languages and have been characterized as "world-wide pseudo-English", often borrowed via other languages such as French or Italian:

- autostop – hitchhiking in French, Italian, Czech, Polish, Serbo-Croatian, Greek οτοστόπ, Russian автостоп, Spanish, Bulgarian, Romanian, Hungarian, etc.
- basket – a shortening of basketball in French, Italian, Romanian baschet, Spanish básquet, Swedish, Turkish, etc. (may also refer to sneakers/trainers, e.g. in French and Romanian)
- camping – campsite or campground in French, Dutch, Greek κάμπινγκ, Bulgarian къмпинг, Russian ке́мпинг, Czech and Polish kemping, Portuguese, Spanish, etc.
- smoking – dinner jacket, tuxedo, or smoking jacket in Danish, French, Czech, Portuguese, German, Italian, Dutch, Greek σμόκιν, Russian, etc.

=== Korean ===
- one shot – "bottoms up" (원샷 [wʌn.ɕjat̚])
- hand phone – "cellphone" (핸드폰 [hɛn.dɯ.pon])
- skinship – platonic hand-holding, hugging, etc. (스킨십; [sɯ.kʰin.ɕip̚])

=== Romance ===
==== French ====
French includes many pseudo-anglicisms, including novel compounds (baby-foot), specifically compounds in -man (tennisman), truncations (foot), places in -ing (dancing meaning dancing-place, not the act of dancing), and a large variety of meaning shifts.

- baby-foot (m, pronounced [ba.bi.fut]) – table football
- baby-parc – playpen
- before – drinks in privileged company before a party, a.k.a. "pregame" (opposite of after)
- blind test – music quiz / "name that tune"
- brushing – blow-dry and styling
- building – high-rise building, tower block
- box – wifi router or parking space
- dancing – dance hall
- dressing (noun) – walk-in closet
- flirt – a brief romance, flirtation, a boyfriend or girlfriend
- footing – jogging (though the real English word is also used in French with the same meaning)
- pressing – dry cleaning shop,
- rallye-paper – a "fox-and-hounds" like game, except with paper scraps instead of foxes
- recordman (m; pl: recordmans; f:recordwoman) – record holder, especially in sports
- relooker (verb) to make over; also: relooking (n; masc.) – a makeover
- scratch (noun) – velcro
- shake-hand
- speaker, speakerine (feminine) – radio or television announcer
- tennisman – a professional tennis player
- wheeling – a wheelie

==== Italian ====
- autogrill (Italian pronunciation: [autoˈɡril]) – rest area (used for any brand, not only for Autogrill chain)
- beauty farm (Italian pronunciation: [bjutiˈfarm]) – spa
- The French borrowing bloc-notes (French pronunciation: [blɔknɔt]) is sometimes written in the pseudo-English form block-notes (Italian pronunciation: [blɔkˈnɔts]) – notebook
- jolly – the joker in a pack of cards
- pullman – a bus
- smart working Italian pronunciation: [zmartˈworking] – remote work, where "smart" is used referring to other devices with an Internet connection, such as smartphones and smartwatches.
- water (Italian pronunciation: [vater]) – flush toilet (from English water closet)

==== Portuguese ====
- outdoor – billboard
- home office – work from home
- shopping – shopping mall
- integralization – Paid-in capital, subscription (finance)

==== Spanish ====
- puenting – bungee jumping
- balconing – balconing
- footing (through French) – jogging, running
- by the face – gratis; boldly (literal translation of "por la cara", with those meanings)
- autostop (through French) – hitchhiking
- tunear (v.), tuneo (n.), tuneado (adj.) – to customize
- mitin (from meeting) – political rally
- pressing catch (since 1990s) – freestyle wrestling
- renting – (initially car) rental
- friki, friqui (adj. and n.), frikada (n., "activity"), frikismo (n., "attitue") – nerd, geek
- trávelin (through French) – camera dolly
- videoclip – music video
- from lost to the river (humorous) – in for a penny, in for a pound; (once we reached this situation then there is) nothing to lose (literal translation of "de perdidos al río")

=== Germanic ===
==== Danish ====
- babylift – baby transport/carrycot
- butterfly – bow tie
- cottoncoat – trench coat
- cowboytoast – minced meat sandwich
- monkeyclass – economy class
- speedmarker – a felt-tip pen
- stationcar – blend of station wagon (US) and estate car (UK)
- timemanager – a calendar or notebook in which one writes down appointments (from the registered trademark Time Manager)

==== Dutch ====
- beamer – a video projector (via German pseudo-anglicism Beamer)
- box – a playpen or a music speaker
- coffeeshop – a shop selling cannabis
- keycord – a lanyard
- oldtimer – a classic car
- touringcar – a coach (bus)
- videoclip – a music video

==== German ====
German pseudo anglicisms often have multiple valid and common ways of writing them, generally either hyphenated (Home-Office) or in one word (Homeoffice).

- Beamer – a video projector
- Bodybag – a messenger bag
- Dressman – a male model (Onysko calls this the "canonical example" of a pseudo-anglicism.)
- Flipper – a pinball machine
- Funsport – a sport played for amusement, such as skateboarding or frisbee
- Handy – a mobile phone
- Jobticket – a free pass for public transport provided by an employer for employees
- Mobbing – bullying
- Oldtimer – an antique car
- Shooting – a photoshoot
- trampen (verb) – hitchhiking

More examples:

==== Norwegian ====
- hands – the offence of handball in association football
- sixpence – Flat cap

==== Swedish ====
- afterski – après‐ski
- afterwork – a meeting for drinks after the workday is finished
- backslick – a wet, combed‐back hair style
- mail – e‐mail
- pocket – a paperback book
- public service – public broadcasting
- speaker – an announcer (such as at sporting events)

=== Slavic ===
==== Serbian ====
- букмејкер, bukmejker – a person who bets, especially on sports and other competitions
- голман, golman – goalkeeper
- хепиенд, hepiend – happy ending
- олдтајмер, oldtajmer – classic car
- стреч, streč – stretch fabric

==== Polish ====
- dres – tracksuit; sometimes also short for dresiarz (youth underclass subculture)

==== Russian ====
- Клипмейкер ("Clip maker") – music video director
- Митинг ("meeting") – rally, demonstration
- Рекордсмен ("records man") – record holder (cf. French pseudo-anglicism "recordman")
- Страйкбол ("strikeball") – airsoft
- Piar (пиар), from PR for "public relations", came to mean all kind of promotion and related hype; extremely productive, see ru:wikt:пиар for derived words

=== Austronesian ===
==== Malaysian Malay ====
- action – boast; boastful
- best – good
- cable – personal connection or insider
- power – great
- sound – scold
- spender – undergarment for lower body e.g. briefs and panties
- terror – great

==== Indonesian ====
- busway – TransJakarta bus; bus rapid transit
- cross boy/girl – delinquent person
- free sex – extramarital sex
- hand body – hand & body lotion
- handphone – mobile phone
- healing – going on a vacation to heal mentally
- magic com – multifunctional rice cooker
- outbound – outdoor education or recreational activities
- sorry-dorry-morry-strawberry – sorry not sorry; sorry
- sound – sound reinforcement system
- travel – inter-regional minibus service
- win-win solution – win-win situation; win-win conflict resolution

=== Other languages ===
==== Maltese ====
- goaler – goalkeeper

== See also ==
- Anglicism
- Barbarism (modern linguistics)
- Calque
- Denglisch
- False friend
- Language transfer
- Loanword
- List of pseudo-German words adapted to English
- List of pseudo-French words adapted to English
- Phono-semantic matching
- Wasei-eigo

== Sources ==
- Anderman, Gunilla M.; Rogers, Margaret; Gottlieb, Henrik (1 January 2005). "11 Anglicisms and Translation". In and Out of English: For Better, for Worse?. Translating Europe. Clevedon: Multilingual Matters. p. 164. ISBN 978-1-85359-787-9. OCLC 812195823.
- Ayres-Bennett, Wendy; Carruthers, Janice; Temple, Rosalind (25 February 2014). "12.4 'Hybrids' and pseudo-anglicisms". Problems and Perspectives: Studies in the Modern French Language. Longman linguistics library. London: Routledge. p. 335. ISBN 978-1-317-88652-5. OCLC 871224464.
- Baldwin, Yuliya (2020). English Loans in Contemporary Russian. Routledge. ISBN 978-1-000-20618-0.
- Betz, Werner; Kolb, Herbert; Lauffer, Hartmut (1977). Sprachliche Interferenz (in German). Niemeyer. ISBN 978-3-484-10285-9.
- Carstensen, Broder (16 November 2015) [1st pub. Gunter Narr:1980]. "Semantische Scheinentlehnungen des Deutschen aus dem Englischen". In Viereck, Wolfgang (ed.). Studien zum Einfluß der englischen Sprache auf das Deutsche [Studies on the Influence of the English Language on German]. Tübingener beigrag zur Linguistik #132 (in German). BoD – Books on Demand. p. 77. ISBN 978-3-87808-132-6. OCLC 1006045710.
- Campos-Pardillos, Miguel Ángel (2015). "All Is not English that Glitters: False Anglicisms in the Spanish Language of Sports" (PDF). Atlantis Journal of the Spanish Association of Anglo-American Studies. 37 (2). AEDEAN: Asociación española de estudios anglo-americanos: 155–174. eISSN 1989-6840. ISSN 0210-6124. JSTOR 24757788.
- Duckworth, David (1977). Best, Werner; Kolb, Werner; Lauffer, Hartmut (eds.). Zur terminologischen Grundlage der Forschung auf dem Gebiet der englisch-deutschen Interferenz. Kritische Übersicht, und neue Vorschlag [The Terminological Basis of Research in the Field of English-German Interference. Critical Overview, and New Proposal.] (in German). Tübingen: Niemeyer. ISBN 9783484102859. OCLC 185584225. "Neubildungen der deutschen Sprache mit Englischem Sprachmaterial."
- Filipović, Rudolf; Partridge, Monica; Herrity, Peter; Jones, Malcolm V.; Terry, Garth M. (1990). "Secondary Anglicisms in a Dictionary of Anglicisms in Serbo-Croatian". The Bell of freedom: essays presented to Monica Partridge on the occasion of her 75th birthday. Nottingham: Astra Press. ISBN 978-0-946134-17-5. OCLC 246527030.
- Furiassi, Cristiano (2010). False Anglicisms in Italian. Monza (Milano): Polimetrica. ISBN 978-88-7699-203-2. OCLC 712112149.
- Furiassi, Cristiano; Pulcini, Virginia; Rodríguez González, Félix (2012). The Anglicization of European Lexis. Amsterdam: John Benjamins Publishing. p. 158. ISBN 978-90-272-1195-8.
- Furiassi, Cristiano; Gottlieb, Henrik (10 March 2015). "2 Qualifying pseudo-Anglicisms". Pseudo-English: Studies on False Anglicisms in Europe. Berlin: De Gruyter. p. 17. ISBN 978-1-5015-0023-7.
- Geyer's Stationer: Devoted to the Interests of the Stationery, Fancy Goods and Notion Trades. New York: Andrew Geyer. 1903. OCLC 1009011742.
- Görlach, Manfred (2001). A Dictionary of European Anglicisms: A Usage Dictionary of Anglicisms in Sixteen European Languages. Oxford: Oxford University Press. ISBN 978-0-19-823519-4. OCLC 429029188.
- Görlach, Manfred (23 May 2002). English in Europe. Oxford: Oxford University Press. ISBN 978-0-19-158069-7. OCLC 768118863.
- Großmann, Anja (2008). "2.2 Die Typologie der Anglizismen nach Jürgen Spitzmüller". Frequenz und Verwendungskontexte des Anglizismus Design in der deutschen Sprache (Studienarbeit) (in German). GRIN Verlag. pp. 4–. ISBN 978-3-640-17674-8.
- Luján-García, Carmen (2017). "Analysis of the presence of Anglicisms in a Spanish internet forum: some terms from the fields of fashion, beauty and leisure". Alicante Journal of English Studies. 30 (30): 277. doi:10.14198/raei.2017.30.10. hdl:10553/41634.
- Onysko, Alexander (2007). "4 Pseudo anglicisms and hybrid anglicisms". Anglicisms in German: Borrowing, Lexical Productivity, and Written Codeswitching. Linguistik: Impulse & Tendenzen, 23. Berlin: Walter de Gruyter. p. 52. ISBN 978-3-11-019946-8. OCLC 901310392.
- Picone, Michael D. (18 October 1996). Anglicisms, Neologisms and Dynamic French. Lingvisticae Investigationes Supplementa Ser.,18. Amsterdam: John Benjamins Publishing Company. p. 350. ISBN 978-90-272-7614-8. OCLC 769341957.
- Rey-Debove, Josette; Gagnon, Gilberte (1990). Dictionnaire des anglicismes : les mots anglais et américains en français [Dictionary of Anglicisms: English and American Words in French]. Usuels du Robert (in French). Paris: Le Robert. ISBN 9782850360275. OCLC 756955952.
- Rosenhouse, Judith, Rotem Kowner, eds., Globally Speaking: Motives for Adopting English Vocabulary in Other Languages, 2008, ISBN 1783091533
- Saugera, Valérie (2017). Remade in France: Anglicisms in the Lexicon and Morphology of French. New York: Oxford University Press. ISBN 978-0-19-062554-2. OCLC 1013564643.
- Scheibel, Larissa (21 February 2007). "2.2 Entlehnungen". Anglizismen/Amerikanismen im Deutschen und Russischen am Beispiel von Online Zeitschriften (Master's thesis) (in German). GRIN Verlag. pp. 10–. ISBN 978-3-638-59645-9.
- Sicherl, Eva; Šabec, Nada; Gabrovšek, Dušan (1999). The English Element in Contemporary Standard Slovene: Phonological, Morphological and Semantic Aspects. Razprave Filozofske fakultete. Znanstveni inštitut Filozofske fakultete. p. 14. ISBN 978-86-7207-114-6. OCLC 442412304.
- Winter, Werner; Societas Linguistica Europaea. Meeting (1995). On Languages and Language: The Presidential Addresses of the 1991 Meeting of the Societas Linguistica Europaea. Trends in linguistics., Studies and monographs; 78. Berlin: Walter de Gruyter. ISBN 978-3-11-013257-1. OCLC 924736602.
- Winter-Froemel, Esme (29 August 2011). "3.4 Entlehnung un Scheinentlehnung nach traditionellen Auffasungen". Entlehnung in der Kommunikation und im Sprachwandel: Theorie und Analysen zum Französischen (in German) (Berlin ed.). Walter de Gruyter. pp. 45–. ISBN 978-3-11-023506-7.
- Yang, Wenliang (1 January 1990). "1.5.2.1 Fremdwort und Lehnwort". Anglizismen im Deutschen: am Beispiel des Nachrichtenmagazins 'Der Spiegel'. Reihe Germanistische Linguistik, 106 (in German). Tuebingen: Walter de Gruyter. pp. 12–. ISBN 978-3-11-167615-9.
- Zenner, Eline; Kristiansen, Gitte (1 January 2014). New Perspectives on Lexical Borrowing: Onomasiological, Methodological and Phraseological Innovations. Boston: De Gruyter Mouton. pp. 2, 10. ISBN 978-1-61451-430-5.
