= List of English words of Scandinavian origin =

This is a list of English words that are probably of modern Scandinavian origin. This list excludes words borrowed directly from Old Norse; for those, see list of English words of Old Norse origin.

== English words of Scandinavian origin ==
- cog (in the sense of a gear, not the ship)
- cosy
- flounder
- hug
- lug
- scree
- snug
- torsk, "codfish"
- wicker

== English words of Danish origin ==
- aquavit, "a clear Scandinavian liquor flavored with caraway seeds"
- fjeld, "a barren plateau of the Scandinavian upland"
- flense, "to strip of blubber or skin"
- scrike, "shriek"
- torsk, "codfish"

== English words of Faroese origin ==
- doegling, a term used by whalers for the northern bottlenose whale, from døglingur
- skua, a seabird, from the Faroese name for the great skua, skúgvur

== English words of Icelandic origin ==
- drott-kvaett, "an Old Icelandic verse consisting of a stanza of eight regular lines"
- jokul, "Icelandic mountain covered with ice and snow"
- maedi-visna, a disease of sheep, from words meaning 'shortness of breath' and 'wasting'
- skyr, "sour curdled milk"

== English words of Norwegian origin ==
- aquavit, "a clear Scandinavian liquor flavored with caraway seeds"
- brisling, "sprat"
- fjord, "a narrow inlet of the sea between cliffs or steep slopes"
- flense, "to strip of blubber or skin"
- floe, "floating ice formed in a large sheet on the surface of a body of water"
- gravlax, "salmon cured especially with salt, sugar, pepper, and dill and often additional ingredients (such as fennel, coriander, lime, and vodka or aquavit)"
- klister, "a soft wax used on skis"
- krill, "planktonic crustaceans and their larvae (order or suborder Euphausiacea and especially genus Euphausia) that constitute the principal food of baleen whales"
- lemming, "any of various small short-tailed furry-footed rodents (such as genera Lemmus and Dicrostonyx) of circumpolar distribution that are notable for population fluctuations and recurrent mass migrations"
- lefse, "a large thin potato pancake served buttered and folded"
- lutefisk, "dried codfish that has been soaked in a water and lye solution before cooking"
- murk, "gloom, darkness; c. 1300, myrke, from Old Norse myrkr 'darkness,' from Proto-Germanic *merkwjo, Danish mǿrk 'darkness',"
- murky, "dark, obscure, gloomy; mid-14c., from murk + -y,"
- scrike, "shriek"
- ski, "one of a pair of narrow strips of wood, metal, or plastic curving upward in front that are used especially for gliding over snow"
- slalom, "skiing in a zigzag or wavy course between upright obstacles (such as flags)"
- telemark, "a turn in skiing in which the outside ski is advanced considerably ahead of the other ski and then turned inward at a steadily widening angle until the turn is complete"
- torsk, "codfish"

== See also ==
- List of English words of Old Norse origin
- Lists of English words by country or language of origin
- List of English words of Swedish origin
