= List of English words of Old English origin =

This is a list of English words inherited and derived directly from the Old English stage of the language. This list also includes neologisms formed from Old English roots and/or particles in later forms of English, and words borrowed into other languages (e.g. French, Anglo-French, etc.) then borrowed back into English (e.g. bateau, chiffon, gourmet, nordic, etc.). Foreign words borrowed into Old English from Old Norse, Latin, and Greek are excluded, as are words borrowed into English from Ancient British languages.

== A ==
- a
- aback
- abaft
- abeam
- abear
- abed
- abide
  abiding
- ablaze
- aboard
- abode
- about
- above
- aboveboard
- abovesaid
- abraid
- abreast
- abroad
- abuzz
- accursed
  accursedly
- ach
- ache
  aching
- ack
- acknowledge
  acknowledging
- acorn
- acre
- addeem
- adder
- addle
- ado
- adrift
- adwesch
- adze
- afar
- afeared
- afford
- affright
- afield
- afire
- afloat
- afoot
- afore
- aforesaid
- aforethought
- afoul
- afresh
- aft
- after
  afterbear
  afterbody
  afterburthen
  aftercare
  aftercast
  afterclap
  aftercrop
  afterflow
  afterglow
  aftergrowth
  afterhand
  afterheat
  afterhind
  afterlife
  afterlook
  aftermath
  afterpeak
  aftershaft
  aftershock
  aftershow
  aftertale
  afterthought
  afterward
  afterwise
  afterwit
- again
- against
- aghast
- aglow
- ago
- aghast
- aground
- ahead
- ahem
- ail
  ailing
- ait
- ajar
- akimbo
- akin
  albeit
  almighty
  almost
  alone
  already
  alright
  also
  although
  altogether
  always
  always
  alwhite
- alack
- alder
- alderman
- ale
  alehouse
  alewife
- alight (v)
- alight (adj)
- alike
- alit
- alive
- all
- allay
- along
  alongside
- aloud
- am
- amain
- amaze
  amazing
- amid
  amidst
- amiss
- among
- amongst
- an
- and
- anent
- anew
- ankle
  anklet
- anneal
- anon
- another
- answer
  answering
- ant
  anteater
  anthill
  antsy
- anvil
- any
  anybody
  anyhow
  anyone
  anything
  anyway
  anywhere
- ape
- apple
- are
- aright
- arise
  arisen
  arising
- arm (anatomical)
  armpit
- arm "poor, pitiful"
- arrow
  arrowhead
  arrowsmith
- arse
  arsehole
  arseling
- as
- asea
- ash
  ashcan
  ashy
- ash (Bot.)
  ashen
- ashamed
- ashore
- aside
- ask
  asking
- asleep
- aspen
- astern
- astir
- astride
- asunder
- at
- ate
- athel
- atheling
- atop
- attercop
- atwitter
- auger
- aught (something)
- aught (zero)
- auld
- awake (v)
  awake (adj)
  awaken
  awakening
  awoke
  awoken
- aware
  awareness
- awash
- away
- awe
- awhile
- awl
- awry
- axe
- axle
- aye (yes)

== B ==
- babble
- babe
- baby
- back
  backbiting
  backbone
  backdrop
  backfill
  backfire
  background
  backhand
  backing
  backlash
  backside
  backslide
  backstab
  backstabber
  backward
  backwash
  backwater
  backwood
- bad
  badder
  baddest
- bade
- baff
- baffle
  baffling
- bairn
- bake
  baker
  bakery
- bald
- bale
  baleful
- balk
- ball
  ballroom
- ballast
- ballock
- bally
- bam
- ban (v)
- ban (n)
- band (ties)
- bane
- bank (mass, heap)
- bann
- bare
  barebone
  barefoot
  barehanded
  bareheaded
  barely
- bark (v)
- barley
- barm
- barmy
- barn
  barnboard
  barnful
  barnlike
  barnyard
- barroom
- barrow (wheelbarrow)
- barrow (mound)
- bass (fish)
- bast
- batch
- bath
  bathe
  bathing
  bathhouse
  bathroom
- batman
- battlefield
- battleship
- baulk
- be
- beach
- beacon
- bead
- beadle
- beady
- beam
- bean
  beanery
- bear (v)
  bearing
- bear (n)
  bearish
- beard
- beat
  beaten
  beater
  beating
- beaver
- beck
- beckon
- becloud
- become
  became
  becoming
- bed
  bedbug
  bedding
  bedridden
  bedrock
  bedroom
  bedstead
- bedeen
- bedizen
- bee
  beehive
  beekeeper
- beech
- beefeater
- beek
- been
- beer
- beetle (n)
- beetle (v)
- befall
- befang
- befit
  befitting
- before
- beforehand
- befoul
- befriend
- befuddle
- beg
  beggar
- beget
  begat
  begotten
- begin
  began
  beginner
  beginning
  begun
- begone
- begripe
- behalf
- behave
- behavior, behaviour
- behead
- behelm
- behest
- behind
- behold
  beheld
- beholden
- behoof
- behoove, behove
- being (n)
- belated
- belay
- belch
- belead
- beleave
- belie
- belief
- believe
  believer
- belittle
- belive "to remain"
- bell
  bellboy
  bellhop
- bellow
  bellowing
- bellows
- bellwether
- belly
  bellyache
  bellyful
- belong
- belongings
- beloved
- beltway
- bemoan
- bench
  benchmark
- bend
  bender
- beneath
- benight
- bent
- bent (bent-grass)
- benumb
- bequeath
- bequest
- bereave
  bereft
- berry
- berth
- beseech
  besought
- beseeching
- beset
- beshield
- beshrew
- beside
- besom
- bespeak
  bespoke
  bespoken
- bespeckled
- bespoke (made to order)
- best
- bestest
- bestir
- bestow
  bestowing
- bestride
- bet
- betide
- betimes
- betoken
- betroth
  betrothed
- better
- between
- betwixt
- beware
- bewilder
  bewildered
- bewitch
- beyond
- bid
- bidden
- bidding
- bide
- bier
- big
- bight
- bill (beak)
- billboard
- billfold
- bind
  binder
  binding
  bindle
  bindweed
- bine
- binge
- birch
- bird
  birdkeeper
  birdling
  birdlore
  birdman
  birdnest
  birdsong
  birdsweet
  birdwalk
  birdwoman
- bit
- bitch
  bitchy
- bite
  bit
  bitten
- bitter
  bitterness
  bittersweet
- bitsy
- bitty
- blab
- blabber
- black
  blackball
  blackberry
  blackbird
  blackhead
  blacklist
  blackmail
  blacksmith
- bladder
- blade
- blain
- blare
- blaring
- blast
  blasted
- blatant
- blaze (fire)
- blazer (jacket)
- blazing
- bleach
- bleacher
- blear
- bleat
- blee "colour"
- bleed
  bleeding (n)
- blench
- blend
  blender
- bless
  blessed, blest
  blessing
- blew
- blight
- blighter
- blind
  blinded
  blindfold
  blindness
  blind
  blindside
- blink
- blinkered
- blinker
- bliss
  blissful
- blithe
  blithesome
- blizzard
- blob
- blockhead
- blood
  bloodbath
  bloodcurdling
  bloodfed
  bloodfin
  bloodheat
  bloodhound
  bloodleaf
  bloodless
  bloodletting
  bloodlike
  bloodloss
  bloodlust
  bloodmeal
  bloodshed
  bloodsoaked
  bloodshot
  bloodstone
  bloodstroke
  bloodstream
  bloodsucker
  bloodsucking
  bloodthirsty
  bloodwood
  bloodwort
  bloody
- bloom
- blossom
- blow
  blowfish
  blowhole
  blown
- blubber
  blubbering
- blur
- blurry
- blurt
- blush
- boar
- board
  boarder
  boardroom
  boardwalk
- boat
  boating
  boatload
  boatswain
- bob (v)
- bobble
- bobcat
- bod
- bode
- bodice
- bodily
- bodkin
- body
  bodyship
  bodywork
- bogeyman
- boil (cyst, tumor)
- bold
- boll
- bollock
- bolster
- bolt (noun)
- bombshell
- bond
  bondman
- bone
  bonebed
  boned
  bonehead
  boneheaded
  boneless
  bonelessness
  bonemeal
  boner
  bonesetter
  boneshaker
  boneyard
  bony
- bonfire
- book
  bookish
  bookkeeper
  booklet
  bookmark
  bookshelf
  bookstaff
  bookstave
  bookstore
  bookworm
- boom (v)
- boot (profit, use)
  bootless
- bore
  bored
  boredom
  boring
- born
- borne
- borough
- borrow
- bosom
- bottleneck
- bottom
  bottomer
  bottomless
- bough
- bought
- boughten
- bound (tied, fastened)
- bourn (small stream)
- bout
- bow (v)
- bow (n)
- bower
- bowl
  bowler (hat)
- bowtie
- box (strike blows)
  boxer
- boxing
- boy
  boyish
- boysenberry
- braid
- brain
  brainchild
  brainstem
  brainstorm
  brainwash
  brainwashing
  brainy
- bramble
- brand
  branding
- brash
- brass
  brassy
- braze (to cover with brass)
- brazen
- breach
- bread
  breadbasket
  breadberry
  breadcrumb
  breadnut
  breadroom
  breadstick
  breadwinner
- breadth
- break
  breaker (wave)
  breakfast
  breakneck
  breakthrough
  breakwater
- breast
  breastbone
  breastfeed
  breastfeeding
  breastless
  breastmilk
  breaststroke
  breastwork
- breath
  breathe
  breather
  breathless
  breathtaking
- breech
- breed
  breeder
- brew
  brewery
- briar
- bride
  bridegroom
  bridesmaid
  bridewell
- bridge
- bridle
- brier
- bright
  brighten
  brightly
  brightness
  brightwork
- brim
  brimful
  brimming
- brimstone
- brinded
- brindle
  brindled
- brine
- bring
- brinkmanship
- briny
- bristle
- bristly
- britch
- brite
- brittle
- bro
- broad
  broadcast
  broaden
  broadside
  broadsword
- broke
- brood
  brooding
  broody
- brook (small stream)
- brook (tolerate, endure)
- broom
  broomstick
- broth
- brothel
- brother
  brotherhood
  brotherless
  brotherly
- brought
- brow
- browbeat
- brown
  brownfield
  brownie
- bruise
- brunch
- brung
- bub
- bubble
  bubbly
- buck
  buckboard
  buckeye
  buckshot
  buckskin
  bucktooth
- bucket
- bud
- buddy
- bugbear
- build
  builder
  building
  buildup
  built
- bulkhead
- bull
- bulldoze
  bulldozer
- bullfinch
- bullheaded
- bullish
- bullock
- bullpen
- bullshit
- bulrush
- bum (buttocks, bottom)
- bumble
- bumblebee
- bunch
- bunt
- burd
- burden
  burdensome
- burly
- burn
  burner
  burnout
  burnup
- burrow
- burst
- burthen
- bury
- bush
  bushy
- business
  businessman
  businessy
  businesswoman
- bust (burst)
- bustle
- busy
- busyness
- but
- butt (end)
- butterfly
- buttermilk
- butternut
- butthole
- buttock
- button
- buxom
- buy
  buyer
- buzz
- by
- bye (sporting)
- bye (good-bye)
- bygone
- bylaw
- byre
- bystander
- byspel
- byword

== C ==
- cade
- cadge
- cadger
- calf
  calve
- call
- callow
- cammock
- can (v)
  cannot
- can (n)
  cannery
- canny
- care
  careful
  carefully
  caregiver
  careless
  carelessness
  caretaker
  careworn
  caring
- cart
  cartwheel
- carve
- cat
  catbird
  catcall
  caterwaul
  cattail
  catwalk
- catchword
- chafer (beetle)
- chaff
  chaffinch
- chaffer
- chalk
- chap (v)
- chapman
  chapbook
- char (chore)
  charwoman
- char (burn)
  charcoal
- chare
- charlock
- chary
- chat
  chatty
- chatter
- chaw
- cheap
- cheddar
- cheek
  cheeky
- cheep
- cherry
- chest
- chestnut
- chew
- chick
- chicken
  chickenlike
  chickenman
  chickenpox
  chickenwort
- chide
- chiffon
- chifforobe
- chilblain
- child
  children
  childbearing
  childcare
  childhood
  childish
  childlike
- chill
  chilly
- chime (rim of a barrel)
- chin
  chinbone
- chink (slit)
- chip
  chippy
- chirp
  chirpy
- chit
- chitchat
- chode
- choke
- chomp
- choose
  chose
  choosy
- chop (cut)
  chopper
  chopstick
- chore
- chuckle
- churl
  churlish
- churn
- cinder
- clad
- clam
- clamber
- clammy
- clamp
- clap
  clapboard
  claptrap
- clash
- clasp
- clatter
- claw
- clay
- clean
  cleanliness
  cleanse
  cleansing
  cleanup
  clearinghouse
- cleat
- cleave (split)
  cleaver
  cloven
- cleave (stick to)
- cleft
- clench
- clever
- clew
- cliff
  cliffhanger
- climb
  climber
- clinch
  clincher
- cling
  clingy
- clink
- clip (fasten)
  clipboard
- clockwise
- clockwork
- clod
  clodhopper
- clot
- cloth
  clothe
  clothes
  clothespin
- cloud
  cloudburst
  cloudy
- clout
- clove (wedge of garlic)
- clover
- clowder
- cluck
- clue
  clueless
- clump
- cluster
- clutch (clench)
- clutter
- coal
  coalfield
  coalfired
- coaming
- coattail
- coax
- cob
- cobble (n)
  cobblestone
- cobble (v)
  cobbler
- cock (bird)
  cockerel
  cockpit
  cocktail
  cocky
- cock (penis)
- cock (pile)
- cock (v)
  cockeyed
- cod
- codger
- coke
- cold
- collard
- collie
- collier
  colliery
- colt
  coltish
- comb
- come
  cometh
  comeback
- comely
- comer
- commingle
- con (study)
- cook
- cookout
- cool
  coolant
  cooler
  coolness
- coolth
- coot
- cop (v)
  copper (v)
- cop (n)
- cop (mass of thread)
- cop (spider)
  cobweb
- copper
  copperhead
  coppern
  coppery
- core (disputed)
- corn
  cornbread
  cornhusker
  cornmeal
  cornstarch
- cot (hut)
- cote
- cotquean
- cough
- could
- couth
- cove
- cow
  cowbell
  cowbird
  cowheel
  cowherd
  cowherder
  cowleech
  cowlick
  cowlike
  cowling
  cowman
  cowmilk
  cownose
  cowpox
- cowl
- coxcomb
- crab
  crabfish
  crablike
  crabling
  crabstick
  crabwise
- crack
  crackdown
  cracker
  crackle
  crackpot
- cradle
- craft
  craftless
  craftlike
  craftsman
  craftsome
  crafty
- cram
- cranberry
- crane
- crank
  crankshaft
- crap
- crash
- crave
  cravings
- craw
- creak
- creep
  creeper
  creepy
- cress
- crestfallen
- crib
- crick
- crimp
- cringe
  cringeling
  cringemaking
  cringeworthy
  cringey
- crinkle
- cripple
- croak
- crock
  crockery
- croft
- crop
  cropfield
  cropland
  cropper
- cross
  crossbow
  crossover
  crossroad
- crow (n)
  crowbar
- crow (v)
- crowd
- crud
- crumb
  crumble
  crumby
  crummy
- crumpet
- crumple
- cruise
- crutch
- cubbyhole
- cud
- cuddle
- cudgel
- cum
- cun
  cunning
- cunt
- cup
  cupboard
- curd
  curdle
- curl
  curly
- curse
- cuss
- cut
  cutoff
  cutpurse
  cutter
  cutthroat
- cuttlefish

== D ==
- dab
- dabble
- dad
  daddy
- daffy
- daft
- daily
- dairy
- daisy
- dale
- dam
- damp
  dampen
- dander (dandruff)
- dandruff
- dandy
- dare
- dark
  darken
  darkling
  darkness
- darling
- darn (conceal a hole)
- dashboard
- dat
- daughter
- daw
- dawdle
- dawg
- dawn
- day
  daybreak
  daydream
  daylight
  daytime
- dead
  deadbeat
  deaden
  deadlock
  deadly
  deadpan
  deadweight
  deadwood
- deaf
  deafen
  deafening
- deal
  dealer
- dear
- dearborn
- dearie
- dearth
- deary
- death
  deathbed
  deathly
  deathwatch
- deed
- deem
  deemed
- deep
  deepen
  deeply
- deer
- deft
  deftly
- delf
- delftware
- dell
- delve
- den
- dene
- dent
- depth
- derby
- derth
- desktop
- dew
- dewlap
- dewy
- dey
- dibble
- dibs
- dick
- did
- diddle
- didst
- die ( < AS *dīegan)
  diehard
- dig (ME diggen ?< AS dīcian)
- digs
- dike
- dill
- dim
  dimmer
  dimwit
- dimple
- din
- dingle
- dingy
- dinky
- dint
- dip
- distaff
- ditch
- dither
- dive
- dizzy
- do
- docket
- dodder
- dodge
- doe
- doff
- dog
  dogdom
  dogfight
  dogfish
  dogger
  doggerel
  dogless
  doglike
  dogshore
  dogspeak
  dogtooth
  dogvane
  dogwatch
  dogwood
- doldrum
- dole
- doleful
- dollop
- dolt
- don
- doom
  doomer
- door
- dot
- dough
  doughboy
  doughnut
- doughty
- dove (n)
- dove (v)
- dow
- down (adv)
- down (n)
  downbeat
  downcast
  downer
- draft
  draftsman
- drag
- dragnet
- drain
- drake (male duck)
- drat
- draught
- draw
  drawback
  drawbridge
  drawdown
  drawer
  drawhook
  drawing
  drawn
  drawth
- dray
- dread
  dreaden
  dreadful
  dreadless
  dreadnought
  dreadsome
- dream
  dreamer
  dreaming
  dreamless
  dreamlike
  dreamt
  dreamy
- dreary
- drench
- drew
- dribble
- drift
  drifter
  driftful
  drifting
  driftless
  driftway
  driftweed
  driftwood
- drink
- drip
- drive
- drivel
- drizzle
- drone
- drool
- drop
  droplet
- dross
- drought
- drove (n)
- drove (v)
- drown
- drowsy
- drudge
  drudgery
- drunk
  drunkard
- druther
- dry
- dub
- duck (bird)
- duck (v)
- ducky
- dud
- dugout
- dull
- dumb
  dumbbell
  dumbfound
  dumbfounded
- dumbledore
- dummy
- dun (v)
- dun (adj)
- dung
- dusk
- dust
  dustball
  dustbath
  dustbathe
  dustcloud
  dustheap
  dusthole
  dustless
  dustlike
  dustman
  dustmite
  dustmote
  dustpan
  dustsheet
  duststorm
  dustwoman
  dusty
- dwarf
- dwell
  dweller
  dwelling
- dwindle
- dye
- dying

== E ==
- ea
- each
- ealdorman
- ean
- ear
  ear (of corn)
  earache
  eardrum
  earful
  earmark
  earring
  earshot
  earwax
  earwig
- earl
  earldom
- early
- earn
  earnings
- earnest
- earth
  earthen
  earthenware
  earthlight
  earthling
  earthly
  earthquake
  earthrise
  earthwork
  earthworm
  earthy
- east
- eastern
- eat
  eaten
  eatery
  eats (n)
- eave
  eave
- eavedrop
  eavedropper
- ebb
- eddy
- edge (n)
- edge (v)
- edgeway
- edgewise
- edging
- edgy
- eel
- eerie
- eff
- eft
- eftsoon
- egad
- egghead
- eh
- eight
  eighteen
  eighth
  eighty
- either
- eke
- elbow
- eld
- elder
- elderly
- eldest
- eldritch
- eleven
- elf
- elk
- ell
- elm
- else
- elsewhere
- embed
- ember
- emmet
- empty
- end
  ending
  endless
  endlike
  endly
  endsay
  endward
  endway
  endwise
- endlong
- enfold
- enlist
- enliven
- enough
- ere
- erne
- errand
- erst
- erstwhile
- ettin
- eve
- even
- evening
- ever
- every
- evil
- ewe
- eye
  eyebrow
  eyelash
  eyelid
  eyesore
  eyetooth
  eyewash
- eyot

== F ==
- fain
- fair (adj)
- fairing
- fall
- fallow (n)
- fallow (adj)
- fang
- far
  faraway
  farness
- fare (n)
- fare (v)
- farewell
- farrow
- fart
- farther
- farthing
- fast (adj)
- fast (v)
- fasten
- fastness
- fat (n)
- fat (adj)
- father
  fatherhood
  fatherland
  fatherless
  fatherlike
  fatherliness
  fatherly
- fathom
- fawn (v)
- fay "to fit, join, unite"
- faze
- fear
  fearful
  fearless
  fearnaught
  fearsome
- feather
  featherbed
  featherbrain
  featherhead
  featherless
  featherlight
  featherlike
  feathertail
  featherweight
  featherwood
  featherwork
  feathery
- feed
  fed
- feel
  feeling
- fell (adj)
- fell (pelt)
- fell (v)
- felt (n)
- fen
- fere
- fern
- ferry (n)
- ferry (v)
- fetch
- fetlock
- fetter
- fettle
- few
- fey
- fickle
- fiddle
- field
  fieldwork
- fiend
- fight
- fike
- filch
- file ("metal tool")
- fill
  filler
  filling
- film
  filmmaker
- filth
- fin
- finch
- find
  finder
  finding
- finew
- finger
- fir
- fire
  firebrand
  firefly
  firehole
  firehouse
  firer
  fireshine
  fireship
  fireside
  firestop
  firestorm
  firewood
  firework
- first
- fish
  fishberry
  fishbowl
  fisher
  fisherman
  fisherwoman
  fishhook
  fishlike
  fishmeal
  fishmoth
  fishpond
  fishtail
  fishwoman
  fishworm
  fishy
- fist
  fistful
- fit (n)
- fit ("sudden attack")
- five
  fifteen
  fifth
  fifty
- fizzle
- flab
- flabbergasted
- flabby
- flagstone
- flail
- flap
  flapper
- flash
  flashback
  flasher
  flashy
- flask
- flat ("apartment, floor")
- flatter
- flax
  flaxseed
- flay
- flea
  flealike
- fledge
  fledgling
- flee
- fleese
- fleet (n)
- fleet ("swift")
- fleeting
- flesh
  fleshpot
  fleshy
- flew
- flibbertigibbet
- flick (n)
- flicker (n)
- flicker (v)
- flight ("act of flying")
- flight ("act of fleeing")
- flimsy
- flint
  flintlock
- flip (v)
- flip (n)
- flipper
- flirt
- flitch
- float
- flock
- flood
- floor
  floorer
  floorset
- flop
- floss
- flow
- flue
- fluke ("flatfish")
- flurry
- flush (v)
- flush (adj)
- flutter
- fly
  flyblown
  flyer
  flystrike
  flytrap
  flyweight
- foal
- foam
- fodder
- foe
- fold
- fold ("pen for animals")
- folk
  folklike
  folklore
  folkmoot
  folkster
  folksy
- follow
  follower
  following
- fond
- fondle
- food
- foot
  feet
  footbridge
  foothill
  foothold
  footing
  footrope
  footsore
  footstep
  footstone
  footstool
  footwear
  footwork
  footworn
- for
  forbear
  forbear ("ancestor")
  forbid
  fordo
  fordrive
  forever
  forget
  forgive
  forgo
  forlorn
  forsake
  forsooth
  forswear
  forwhy
- ford
- fore
  forebode
  foreboding
  forecast
  forechoose
  foredoom
  forefather
  forego
  foreground
  forehand
  forehead
  forelead
  foreman
  foremost
  forerunner
  foresaid
  foresee
  foreshadow
  foreshorten
  foreskin
  forestall
  foretell
  forethought
  foretoken
  forewarn
  forewit
  foreword
  forward
- former
- forth
  forthfare
  forthgoing
- fortnight
- foster
- fought
- foul
- foundling
- four
  fourteen
  fourth
  forty
- fowl
- fox
- frame
- framework
- frazzle
- freak
- free
  freebooter
  freedom
  freeflow
  freeloader
  freerunning
  freethinker
  freethinking
  freethought
  freewheeling
  freeway
- freeze
  freezing
- fremd (also fremmit, frempt) "strange, foreign, alien"
- fresh
  freshen
  freshman
  freshness
- fret
- friend
  friendless
  friendly
  friendship
- fright
  frighten
  frightful
  frightless
- frog
  frogged
  frogging
  froglike
  frogly
- from
- frost
  frostbitten
  frosting
  frosty
- froward
- frowzy
- frumpy
- fuck (informal)
- fudge
- fulfill
- full
- fun
  funny
- furlong
- furrow
- further
- furze
- fuzz

== G ==
- gad
- gadfly
- gaffer
- gain
  gaincoming
  gaingiving
  gainrising
  gainsaw
  gainsay
  gainsaying
  gainset
  gainspeaker
  gainspeaking
  gainstand
  gainward
  gainyield
- gal
- gale
- gall ("bile")
- gall ("sore spot")
- gallows
- gamble
- game
- gammer
- gander
- gang
- gangster
- gannet
- gar
- garlic
- gat
- gate
  gatekeep
  gatekeeper
  gatekeeping
  gateway
- gather
  gathering
- gavel
- geld
- gemstone
- get
- ghastly
- ghost
  ghostdom
  ghosted
  ghosthunt
  ghosthunter
  ghosthunting
  ghosting
  ghostless
  ghostlore
  ghostly
- giddy
- gild
  gilded
  gilt
- gimcrack
- gimp
- gingerbread
- gird
- girdle
- girl
  girlhood
  girlie
- git
- give
- glad
- glare
- glass
  glassblower
  glassblowing
  glasshouse
  glassless
  glassmaker
  glassware
- glaze
- gleam
- glee
- gleeman
- glide
- glimmer
- glimpse
- glisten
- gloaming
- gloom
  gloomy
- glove
- glow
  glowie
- glum
- gnarled
  gnarl
  gnarly
- gnat
- gnaw
- go
- goad
- goal
- goat
  goatee
  goatgrass
  goatherd
- god
  goddaughter
  goddess
  godfather
  godhead
  godhood
  godless
  godlike
  godly
  godmother
  godsend
  godsibling
  godson
- gofer
- goggle
- gold
  golden
  goldfinch
  goldfish
  goldish
  goldsmith
- golliwog
- golly
- good
  goody
- goose
  gooseberry
  goosefish
  gooseflesh
  goosefleshed
  goosefleshy
  goosefoot
  goosegrass
  gooseherd
  gooselike
  gooseling
  gooseneck
  goosestep
  goosetongue
  goosish
  goosy
- gore (n)
- gore (v)
- gorse
- gory
- gosh
- goshawk
- gosling
- gospel
- gossamer
- gossip
- gotcha
- grandfather
- grandstand
- grapple
- grasp
- grass
  grassbird
  grasseater
  grassfinch
  grassfire
  grasshopper
  grassland
  grassless
  grasslike
  grassplot
  grasswren
  grassy
- grave ("ditch, burial plot")
- grave ("to dig")
- gray
- graze ("to eat grass")
- graze ("to make contact")
- great
- greedy
  greed
- green
  greenback
  greenbone
  greener
  greenfeed
  greenfield
  greenfinch
  greenfly
  greenhand
  greenhead
  greenheart
  greenhorn
  greenhouse
  greenless
  greenroom
  greensand
  greenshank
  greensick
  greensickness
  greenside
  greensome
  greenspeak
  greenstone
  greenth
  greenware
  greenwash
  greenwax
  greenway
  greenweed
  greenwood
  greeny
- greet ("to meet")
- greet ("to cry")
- gremlin
- grey
  greyhead
  greyhound
  greyish
  greyishly
  greylist
  greyness
  greystone
  greyware
  greywater
- grill "to anger, provoke"
- grill "harsh"
- grim
- grime
- grin
- grind
  grindset
  grindstone
- grip
- gripe
- grisly
- grist
- gristle
- grit
- grits
- groan
- groat
- groin
- groom ("youth")
- groom ("bridegroom")
- groove
  groovy
- grope
- ground
- grout
- grove
- grow
- grub
- grump
- grunge
  grungy
- grunt
- guild
- guilt
- guilty
- gulch
- gum ("membranes of the mouth")
- gunwale
- gut

== H ==
- ha
- hack ("chop")
- hack ("hireling")
- hacker
- hackle
- hackney
  hackneyed
- hacksaw
- had
- haft
- hag
  hagfish
  hagridden
- haggaday
- haggle
- hail ("frozen rain")
- hair
  hairball
  haircut
  hairy
- hake
- hale ("healthy")
- half
- halibut
- halidom
- hall
  hallmark
- hallo
- hallow
- halmote
- halt ("lame")
- halter
- halve
- ham
- hammer
  hammerhead
- hamstring
- hand
  handbook
  handcuff
  handfast
  handicap
  handicraft
  handiwork
  handkerchief
  handle
  handmaid
  handout
  handsome
  handwriting
- hang
  hanger
  hanging
  hangnail
  hangover
- hansom
- hantle
- harbor (also harbour)
- hard
  hardhat
  hardhead
  hardheaded
  hardly
  hardon
  hardnosed
  hardover
  hardtack
  hardware
  hardwood
- hare
  harebell
  harebrained
  harehound
- hark
- harken
- harm
  harmful
  harmless
- harp
- harrow ("rake")
- harrow ("to wound")
  harrowing
- harry
- hart
- harvest
- hasp
- hassle
- hassock
- hat
  hatband
  hatless
  hatpin
  hatstand
  hatter
- hatch ("emerge from an egg")
- hatch ("gate")
- hate
  hatefilled
  hateful
  hater
- hath
- hatred
- have
- hawse
- hawthorn
- hay
  haycock
  haymaker
  haymow
  haynet
  hayrick
  hayseed
  haystack
  hayward
  haywire
- haze
  hazing
  hazy
- hazel
  hazelnut
  hazelwood
  hazelworm
  hazelwort
- he
- head
  headache
  hueadhunt
  headhunter
  headless
  headlong
  headshot
  headstone
  headway
  headword
  headwound
  heady
- heal
  healand
  healer
  healing
  health
- heap
  heapful
  heapmeal
- hear
  heard
  hearing
  hearsay
  hearsome
- hearken
- heart
  heartache
  heartbeat
  heartbreak
  heartbreaker
  heartbroken
  heartburn
  hearten
  heartfelt
  heartful
  heartland
  heartless
  heartrending
  heartsick
  heartsome
  heartsore
  heartstring
  heartwood
  heartworm
  hearty
- hearth
- heat
  heater
  heating
  heatshield
  heatstroke
  heatwave
- heath
- heathen
- heather
- heave
- heaven
- heavy
  heavyish
  heavyset
  heavyweight
- heck
- hedge
- heed
- heel
- heel ("of a ship")
- heel ("bad person")
- heft
- heifer
- height
- heinie ("buttocks")
- heirloom
- held
- hell
  hellcat
  hellfire
  hellhole
  hellscape
- hello
- helm
- help
  helpmate
- helve
- hem
- hemlock
- hemp
- hen
- hence
- henchman
- henge
- her ("object")
- her ("possessive")
  hers
  herself
- herd
- here
  hereabout
  hereafter
  hereaway
  hereby
  herein
  hereinabove
  hereinafter
  hereinbefore
  hereness
  hereof
  hereon
  hereto
  heretofore
  hereunder
  hereunto
  hereupon
  herewith
- heriot
- herring
- hew
- hey
- heyday
- hi
- hiccup
- hide ("to conceal")
- hide ("skin")
- hidebound
- hie
- high
  highball
  highboy
  highbrow
  highlight
  highway
- hight
- hijack
- hike
- hill
  hilling
  hillock
  hillside
  hilltop
  hilly
- hilt
- him
  himself
- hind ("after")
  hindbrain
  hindmost
  hindsight
- hind ("doe")
- hinder ("obstruct")
- hinder ("rear")
- hinge
- hint
- hip
- hip ("rose hip")
- hire
  hireling
- his
- hiss
  hissing
- hitch
- hither
  hitherto
- hive
  hivemind
  hives
- ho
- hoar
  hoarfrost
  hoary
- hoard
  hoarder
- hoarse
- hob
- hobble
- hobnail
- hobnob
- hobo
- hock ("leg joint")
- hog
  hogshead
  hogwash
  hogweed
- hold (v)
- hold ("lower part of a ship")
- hole
- holiday
- holiness
- holler
- hollow
- holly
  hollyhock
- holster
- holt
- holy
  holiness
  holyday
  holystone
- home
  homeboy
  homecoming
  homely
  homesickness
  homestead
  homework
- hone
- honey
  honeydew
  honeymoon
  honeysuckle
- hood ("covering")
- hood ("neighborhood")
- hoodwink
- hoof
- hook
  hooker
- hoop
- hoot
- hop
- hope
  hoping
- hopped
- hopper
- hopscotch
- horehound
- horn
  horny
- hornet
- hornswoggle
- horse
  horsefeathers
  horseflesh
  horsefly
  horselaugh
  horsely
  horseman
  horsemanship
  horsemeat
  horsemilk
  horsen
  horseplay
  horseshoe
- hose
- hoss
- hot
  hotbed
  hothead
  hothouse
- hound
  houndfish
  houndish
  houndlike
  houndling
  houndsberry
  houndsman
  houndstooth
  houndy
- hourglass
- house
  houseboat
  housebound
  houseboy
  housebreak
  housefly
  housefolk
  household
  householder
  housekeep
  housekeeper
  housekeeping
  houseleek
  housewife
  housework
  housing "lodging"
- hovel
- hover
  hoverboard
  hovercraft
  hoverer
  hoverfly
  hovering
  hoveringly
- how
- howbeit
- howdy
- however
- howl
- hub
- huckleberry
- huddle
- hue "blee, colour"
- hull "seed casing"
- hum
  humdrum
- hummock
- hunch
- hundred
- hung
- hunger
- hunt
  hunter
  huntress
- hurdle
- hurl
  hurling
- hurry
- hurst
- hush
- husk
- hussy
- hutch "storage chest"

== I ==
- ice
  iceberg (partial trans. of Dutch ijsberg)
  icefall
  iceless
  icemelt
  icepick
  icicle
- icky
- idle
- if
- ilk
- in
  inasmuch
  inborn
  inbring
  income
  indoor
  infighting
  ingrown
- indeed
- infare
- infield
- inflight
- ingot
- inhold
- inkhorn
- inkling
- inlaid
- inland
- inlead
- inlet
- inmate
- inn
- innard
- inner
- inning
- input
- inroad
- inset
- inside
- insight
  insightful
- instead
- instep
- intake
- into
- inward
- inwit
- iron (an early borrowing from Proto-Celtic)
- ironclad
- is
- island
- it
- itch
- its
- itself
- ivy

== J ==
- jab
- jabber
- jackanapes
- jackdaw
- jag "sharp edge"
  jagged
- jar (verb)
- jaw
- jerk
- jitter
  jitterbug
  jitters
- job
- jog
- joll
- jolt
- jowl
- jumble
- jump
- jumper

== K ==
- kale
- keen
- keep
  keepsake
- kelp
- kemb
- kempt
- ken
  kenning
- kernel
- key
  keyed
  keyhole
  keying
  keyring
  keystone
- kick
- kidney
  kidneyless
  kidneylike
  kidneyshell
  kidneywood
  kidneywort
- kill
  killdeer
  killer
  killing
- kiln
- kin
  kindred
  kinfolk
  kinhood
  kinship
- kind (n)
- kind (adj)
- kine
- king
  kingdom
  kinghood
  kingship
  kingside
  kingslayer
- kipper
- kiss
  kisser
  kissing
  kissless
- kitchen
- kite
- kith
- knap
- knave
- knead
- knee
- kneel
- knew
- knife
- knight
- knit
- knock
- knoll
- knop
- knot
- know
  knowledge
- knuckle
- knurl
- kythe

== L ==
- lack
- lad
- ladder
- lade
  laden
  lading
- ladle
- lady
  ladies
  ladyfinger
  ladylike
  ladylove
  ladyship
- laid
- laidly
- lain
- lair
- laird
- lake
- lamb
  lambchop
  lambiness
  lambing
  lambish
  lambkill
  lambkin
  lambless
  lamblike
  lambwool
- lame
- land
  landbridge
  landed "owning land"
  landfall
  landfill
  landform
  landholder
  landing
  landlady
  landless
  landlock
  landlocked
  landlord
  landlubber
  landmark
  landscape
  landslide
  landward
  landwhale
- lane
- lank
  lanky
- lap (n)
  lapdog
- lap (v)
- lap "to fold (over)" (v)
- lapel
- lappet
- lapwing
- larboard
- lark
- last (adj./adv.)
- last (v.)
- last "shoemaker's block"
- latch
- late
  later
  latest
- lath
- lather
- latter
- laugh
  laughter
- lave "the rest" (n.)
- lave "to pout water on" (v.)
- lawn
- lax
- lay
  layabout
  layaway
  layer
  layoff
  layover
  layup
- layman
- lea
- leach
- lead (n.)
  leaden
- lead (v.)
  leader
  leadership
- leaf
  leaflet
- lean (adj.)
- lean (v.)
- leap
  leaper
  leapfrog
  leapfrogger
  leapfrogging
- learn
- lease "to gather, collect"
- lease "false, deceptive"
- leasing
- least
- leather
  leatherback
  leathercraft
  leatherhead
  leatherwork
  leathery
- leave "permission" (n.)
- leave (v.)
- lech
- lede "people; tenements, possessions"
- lede "introductory paragraph"
- ledge
- ledger
- lee
- leech "worm"
- leech "physician"
- leek
- leer
- leery
- leeward
- leeway
- left (adj.)
- leftover
- leman
- lend
- length
  lengthen
  lengthy
- less
  lessen
- lest
- let "to allow"
  letdown
- let "to delay"
- letch
- letterhead
- lewd
- liar
- lich
- lick
- lid
- lie "to recline" (v.)
  lier
- lie "to speak falsely" (v.)
- lie "an untruth" (n.)
- lief
  liever
- life
  lifeblood
  lifeguard
  lifeless
  lifelike
  lifelong
  lifespan
  lifetime
- liftoff
- light (adj.)
  lightheaded
  lighthearted
  lighten
  lightly
  lights
  lightweight
- light (n.)
  light (v.)
  lighten
  lightening
  lighter
  lighthouse
  lightning
- like (adj.)
  likely
  likeminded
  liken
  likeness
  likewise
- like (v.)
- lilt
- limb
- limber (adj.)
  limelight
  limestone
- limp (v.)
- limp (adj.)
- linch
- linchpin
- lisp
- listen
- live
  lively
  living
- liver
  liverish
  liverleaf
  liverloaf
  livermush
  liverwort
- loaf
- loathe
  loathesome
- lob
- lock
  lockdown
  lockfast
  locker
  lockpick
  locksmith
  locksmithing
  lockstep
- long
- look
- lord
  lordful
  lordhood
  lordless
  lordly
  lordliness
  lordness
  lordship
  lordy
- lore
- lose
  loser
  loss
- lot
- loud
  loudmouth
  loudspeaker
- louse
  lice
- love
  lovebird
  loveday
  loveless
  lovely
  lover
  loveship
  loveshy
  lovesick
  lovesome
  lovestone
  loveworthy
- lung
  lungfish
- lush (adj.)
- lust
  lustful
  lustily
  lusty
- lye
- lying
- lynch

== M ==
- mad
  madbrain
  madbrained
  madden
  maddening
  madder
  madman
  madhouse
  maddle
  madling
  madly
  madness
  madsome
  madstone
  madwoman
  madwort
- maid
- maiden
- main
  maincrop
  mainer
  mainful
  mainland
  mainly
  mainpin
  mainmast
  mainsheet
  mainspan
  mainspring
  mainstem
  mainstream
  maintop
  maintopmast
  mainyard
- make
  makeshift
- mallow
- malm
- manifold
- man
  manhole
  manhood
  manly
  manned
- maple
- mare
- mark
- marrow
- marsh
- marshmallow
- mash
- mast
  masthead
  mastless
- match (verb)
  matcher
  matchmaker
  matchup
  matchy
- mate
- mattock
- maund
- may
- maybe
- maze
- me
- mead
- meadow
- meal
  mealtide
- mean
- meanwhile
- meat
  meatball
  meathead
  meathook
  meatless
  meatlike
  meaty
- meet
  meeting
- mellow
- meld
- melt
  meltdown
- mer
  merbaby
  merboy
  merbrother
  mercow
  merdaughter
  merdog
  merfather
  merfolk
  merfriend
  mergirl
  merhorse
  merking
  merkingdom
  merknight
  merlady
  merland
  mermaid
  merman
  mermin
  mermother
  mermouse
  merqueen
  merswine
  mersnake
  merteen
  merwife
  merwitch
  merwolf
  merwoman
  merworld
- mere
- merry
- mesh
- mess
- mettle
- mice
- mickle
- mid
  midday
  midnight
  midsummer
  midway
  midwinter
  midwit
- middle
  middleman
  middling
- midget
- might
  mighty
- mild
- mildew
- milk
  milkfat
  milkfish
  milkmaid
  milkman
  milkpox
  milkshake
  milkshed
  milksnake
  milksop
  milksoppish
  milksoppy
  milkweed
  milkwoman
- milt
- mind
  minder
  mindhood
  mindless
  mindlike
  mindly
- mingle
- minnow
- mint
- mire
- mirth
- mis
  misdeed
- miss (verb)
- mist
- mistletoe
- mite
- moan
- mole
- molten
- mom
- month
- mood
- moon
  moonman
  moonshine
- moor
- moot
- more
- morrow
- moss
- most
  mostly
- mote
- moth
- mother
  motherland
  motherless
  motherlike
  motherload
  motherly
  mothership
  motherwort
  mothery
- mound
- mourn
- mouse
  mousehole
  mousetrap
- mouth
- mow
- mug
- mugwort
- mulch
- murder
  murderer
- mush
  mushy
- must
- my
  myself

== N ==
- name
  namesake
- nail
  nailbed
- naked
- nap
- narrow
- navel
- near
  nearby
- neck
  neckbeard
- need
- needle
- neighbour
- neither
- ness
- nest
  nestle
  nestling
- net
  netting
- nether
- nettle
- never
  nevertheless
- new
  newcomer
  newling
  newly
  newmake
  news
  newset
- newt
- newton
- nickname
- nigh
- night
  nightcrawler
  nightfall
  nightingale
  nighthawk
  nightlife
  nightlong
  nightmare
  nightrider
  nightshade
  nightstand
  nighttide
  nighttime
  nightwalker
  nightwalking
  nightwatchman
- nim
- nimble
- nine
  nineteen
  ninety
- no
- nobody
- nod
- non(partially)
- nonce
- none
- nonetheless
- nook
- north
  northeast
  northern
  northward
  northwest
- nose
  nosedive
  nosering
  nosey
  nostril
- not
- nothing
- nowhere
- now
- numb
- nut
  nutshell

== O ==
- oak
- oar
- oat
  oatmeal
- oath
  oathbound
  oathbreach
  oathless
- of
- off
  offbeam
  offbear
  offbeat
  offcome
  offcoming
  offcut
  offhand
  offhanded
  offhold
  offlay
  offlead
  offlead
  offload
  offputting
  offset
  offshore
  offsmite
  offspring
  offstand
  offthrow
- often
- old
- on
  onbeam
  onbeat
  onboard
  onbringing
  oncome
  oncoming
  onfall
  ongang
  onglide
  ongo
  ongoing
  onhand
  onhanger
  onhold
  onholding
  onlay
  onlead
  onlend
  onload
  onlook
  onlooker
  onlooking
  onroad
  onrush
  onrushing
  onsend
  onset
  onto
  onward
- one
  onefold
  only
- onfang
- ooze
- open
- or
- orchard
- ore
- other
  otherkin
- otter
- ought
- our
- out
  outback
  outbreak
  outburst
  outcome
  outdo
  outdoors
  outer
  outfit
  outflee
  outgoing
  outgrow
  outhouse
  outland
  outlandish
  outlast
  outrun
  outset
  outside
  outward
  outwork
- oven
- over
  overbear
  overboard
  overcome
  overdo
  overdose
  overflow
  overhead
  overload
  oversee
  overset
  overshadow
  overshoot
  overshot
  oversit
  overstep
  overthrow
  overwhelm
  overwork
- owe
- owl
- own
  owndom
  owner
  ownership
- ox
  oxbow
  oxlip

== P ==
- pack
- paddock
- pan
- pat
- path
  pathfinder
- peak
- pear
- pebble
- pen (enclosure)
- pence
  penny
- pick
- pig
  piggish
  piggy
  piggyback
  pigheaded
  pigherd
  pigpen
  pigsty
  pigtail
  pigweed
- pimple
- pin
  pinafore
  pinhead
  pinhole
  pinner
  pinprick
  pintle
- pinfold
- pillow
- pitch
- pitfall
- pith
- play
  playbill
  playboy
  player
  playfight
  playful
  playgirl
  playground
  playhouse
  playlist
  playoff
  playpen
  playreader
  playreading
  playwright
  plaything
  playtime
  playware
  playwork
  playworker
  playworthy
  playwright
  playwright
- plight
- plot
- plough plow
- pluck
- pock
  pockmark
  pox
- pod
- pond
- pool (as in a swimming pool)
- pot
  potter
  pottery
  potty
- pound
- preen (pin)
- pretty
- prick
- pride
- proud
- pry
- puff
  puffball
- pull
- pun
- punt (boat)
- purse
- put

== Q ==
- qualm
- quake
- queem
- queen
- quell
- quench
- quick
  quicksand
  quicksilver
- quirn
- quiver (verb)
- quoth

== R ==
- raid
  raider
- rain
  rainbird
  rainbow
  raindrop
  rainfall
  rainmaker
  rainstorm
  rainwash
  rainworm
  rainy
- rake
- ram
- rame
- rathe
- rather
- rattle
  rattlesnake
- raw
- raven
- reach
- read
- ready
  readily
  readiness
- ream (froth)
- reap
- rear (as in rearing livestock)
- reard "voice, sound"
- reave
- reckless
- reckon
- red
  redshift
- redd
- rede
- reed
- reek
- reeve
- rend
- rest
  restless
- rethe
- rib
  ribeye
- rich (an early borrowing from Proto-Celtic)
- richdom
- riche "kingdom, realm"
- riddle
- ridge
- right
  righteousness
- rim
- rind
- ring
  ringworm
- rink
- ripe
- rise
- rivel
- road
  roadbed
  roadbuilding
  roadless
  roadside
  roadwork
- roam
- roar
- rod
- rood
- rogh
- roof
  rooftop
  rooftree
- rook (bird)
- room
- roost
- rooster
- rope
- rot
- rother
- rotten
- rough
  roughhouse
  roughrider
  roughshod
- round "to whisper"
- row
  rowboat
- rudder
- ruddock
- ruddy
- rue
- rugby
- ruly
- run
  runaway
  rundown
  runny
  runtime
  runway
  runny
- rung
- rush
- rust
- rustle
- rye

== S ==
- sack
- sad
  sadden
  sadfishing
  sadness
- saddle
  saddlebill
  saddlebow
  saddlecloth
  saddleless
  saddlelike
  saddletree
- sail
  sailboat
  sailcloth
  sailfish
  sailing
  sailor
  sailyard
  sailyarn
- sake
- sallow
- salt
  saltspoon
  saltwater
  salty
- sand
  sandblast
  sandfly
  sandman
  sandpiper
  sandshoe
  sandsoap
  sandstorm
  sandworm
  sandwort
  sandy
- sap
  sapling
  sappy
- saw
- say
- scathe
- scab
- scop
- sea
  seabed
  seabird
  seaboard
  seafare
  seafarer
  seafaring
  seafloor
  seafood
  seafowl
  seagrass
  seahorse
  sealife
  seaquake
  seascape
  seashell
  seashore
  seasick
  seaside
  seastar
  seawater
  seaway
  seaweed
  seawolf
  seaworthy
- seam
  seamstress
- see
  seer
- seed
  seedeater
  seeder
  seedling
  seedly
  seednut
  seedtime
  seedy
- seethe
- seldom
- self
  selfish
  selfless
- send
- set
  setting
- settle
- seven
  seventeen
  seventy
- sew
- shabby
- shackle
- shade
  shady
- shadow
- shaft
- shag
- shake
- shale
- shall
- shallow
- sham
- shame
  shameful
  shameless
  shaming
- shand
- shank
- shape
  shapeless
  shapely
  shapeshift
  shapeshifter
  shapeshifting
- shard
- share
- sharp
  sharpshooter
- shatter
- shave
- she
- sheaf
  sheafwise
- shear
- sheath
- shed
- sheen
- sheep
  sheepfold
  shepherd
- shelf
- shell
  shellfish
- shelter
- sheriff
- shield
- shift
  shiftwork
  shifty
- shin
- shine
  shiner
  shining
  shiny
- ship
  shipboard
  shipbuilder
  shipbuilding
  shipload
  shipman
  shipowner
  shipping
  shipshape
  shipwright
  shipyard
- shit (Informal)
  shitty
- shirt
- shoal
- shoe
  shoehorn
  shoemaker
  shoemaking
  shoestring
- shoot
  shooter
  shooting
- shop
  shopfloor
  shophouse
  shopkeep
  shopkeeper
  shoplift
  shoplifter
  shoplifting
  shopman
  shopper
  shopping
  shopward
- shore
- short
  shortening
- shot
  shotgun
- shoulder
- shove
- shovel
- show
  showboat
- shred
- shrew
- shrewd
- shrill
- shrink
- shroud
- shrub
- shuffle
- shun
- shut
  shutdown
  shuteye
  shutter
  shuttle
- shy
- sick
  sickening
- side
  sideboard
  sideless
  sidelong
  sideman
  sidesaddle
  sideshow
  sidestick
  sideswipe
  sidewalk
  sideway
  sidewinder
  siding
- sieve
- sift
- sigh
- sight
  sighted
  sightful
  sightless
  sightly
  sightseeing
  sightwise
- sill
- silly
- silver
  silverback
  silvereye
  silverfish
  silverish
  silvern
  silvery
- sin
- since
- sing
  singer
- sinew
- sink
- sit
- six
  sixteen
  sixth
  sixty
- slack
  slacken
  slacker
  slackly
  slackness
  slackwater
- slay
- sleep
  sleepless
  sleepwalk
- sleeve
- sledge
  sledgehammer
- slick
- slide
- slime
- slip (liquid)
- slip (v)
  slipper
- slit
- sliver
- slop
- slope
- sloppy
- sloth
  slothen
  slothful
- slow
  slowback
  slowdown
  slowfooted
  slowpoke
  slowworm
- slumber
- small
  smallholder
  smallholding
  smallish
  smallmouth
  smallpox
  smalls
- smart
  smartweed
- smell
- smelt (fish)
- smite
- smith
- smock
- smog
- smoke
  smokehouse
  smokeless
  smoker
  smoking
- smooth
  smoothbore
- smother
- snail
- snake
- snatch
- sneak
  sneaky
- sneeze
- snitch
- snivel
- snore
- snort
- snow
  snowball
  snowdrift
  snowdrop
  snowfall
  snowfield
  snowflake
  snowhorse
  snowless
- so
- soak
- soap
  soaplock
  soapmaker
  soapmaking
  soapnut
  soapstar
  soapstock
  soapstone
  soaptree
  soapweed
  soapwood
  soapwort
- soft
  soften
  softly
  softness
  softwood
- some
  somebody
  someday
  somehow
  someone
  something
  sometime
  sometimes
  somewhat
  somewhen
  somewhence
  somewhere
  somewhither
  somewhy
- son
- song
  songbird
  songwriter
  songwriting
- soon
- soot
- sooth
  soothe
  soothing
  soothsayer
- sop
  soppy
- sorrow
  sorrowful
- sorry
- sought
- soul
  soulful
  soulless
- sour
  sourdough
- south
  southbound
  southeast
  southern
  southward
  southwest
- sow
- span
- spar
- spare
- spark
  sparkle
  sparkler
- sparrow
  sparrowhawk
  sparrowish
  sparrowlike
- speak
  speakeasy
  speaker
  speakworthy
- speck
- spear
  spearbush
  spearhead
  spearmint
  spearsmith
  spearthrower
  spearwood
- speech
  speechless
- speed
  sleedful
  speedless
  speedread
  speedrun
- spell
- spew
- spider
  spiderdom
  spiderless
  spiderlike
  spidership
  spiderweb
  spiderwisp
  spiderwood
  spidery
- spill
  spillway
- spin
  spinner
  spinster
- spit
  spitfire
- spoke
- spoon
  spoonbill
  spoonfeed
  spoonful
- sprat
- sprawl
- spread
- spring
  springer
  springfish
  springing
  springtime
  sprung
- spur
- spurt
- staff
- stake
- stammer
- stamp
- stalk
  stalker
- stall (noun)
- stalwart or alternatively stalworth
- stamp
- star
  stardom
  stardust
  starfish
  starlight
  starly
  starlore
  starman
  starquake
  starry
  starward
- stare
- start
- startle
- starve
  starveling
  starving
- stead
  steadfast
  steady
- steal
  stealth
- steam
  steamboat
- steed
- steel
  steeler
  steelman
  steelmanning
  steelmanning
  steelmans
  steelmen
  steelmaker
  steelmaking
  steels
  steelwork
  steelworker
  steelworking
  steelmaker
- steep
- stem
- stench
- step
  stepchild
  stepdaughter
  stepfather
  stepmother
  stepson
- steven "voice"
- stevvon
- stick
  sticker
- stiff
- still (adjective)
- stilt
- sting
  stinger
- stink
- stirrup
- stitch
  stitchcraft
  stitchless
  stitchlike
  stitchwork
  stitchwort
- stock
- stolen
- stone, from OE stan
  stonecrop
  stoned
  stoner
  stonefish
  stonefly
  stoneless
  stoneman
  stonewashed
  stoneware
  stonework
  stonewort
- stool
- stoop
- stop
  stopgap
  stoplight
  stopover
  stopper
- stork
- stound "hour"
- stow
  stowaway
- straddle
- straw
  strawberry
  strawhead
  strawman
- stream
  streamer
  streamling
- strength
- stretch
- strew
  strewn
- stride
  strider
- strike
  strikethrough
- string
  stringy
- stroke
  strokesman
- strong
  strongarm
  stronghold
  strongman
- stub
- stud
- stun
  stunned
  stunner
  stunning
- sty
- such
- suck
  sucker
  suckle
  suckling
- sully
- summer
  summerbeam
  summerhouse
  summering
  summerish
  summerless
  summerlike
  summerteeth
  summertime
  summertree
  summerwood
  summery
- sun
  sunrise
  sunset
  sunshade
  sunshine
  sunshower
- swallow
  swallowtail
- swamp
- swan
- swap
- swarm
- swart
- swarthy
- swath
- swear
- sweat
  sweater
  sweathouse
  sweatish
  sweatshirt
  sweatshop
  sweaty
- sweep
  sweepstake
- sweet
  sweetbread
  sweetbriar
  sweeten
  sweetener
  sweetgrass
  sweetish
  sweetkin
  sweetly
  sweetmeat
  sweetness
  sweets
- swell
- swift
- swill
- swim
  swimmer
  swimming
- swing
- swipe
- sword
  sword fight
  sword fighter
  sword fighting
  swordfish
  swordsman

== T ==
- tad
- tadpole
- tail
- tale
- talk
- tall
- tallow
- tame
- tape
- tar
- tarry
- taught
- teach
  teacher
  teaching
- teal
- team
- teasel
- teem
- teen
  teendom
  teenhood
- teeth
- tell
  teller
- ten
  tenfold
- terve
- tether
- thane
- thank
  thankfulness
- tharm
- that
- thatch
- thaw
- the
- thee
- theft
- there
  thereafter
  therefore
  therewith
- these
- thick
  thicken
- thicket
- thief
  thieve
- thigh
- thimble
- thin
  thinning
- thing
  thingy
- think
- thirst
- this
- thong
- thorn
- thorough
  thoroughbred
  thoroughly
  thoroughness
  thoroughsped
- thorp
- those
- thou
- though
- thought
  thoughtful
  thoughtless
- thousand
- thrash
- thread
- threap
- three
  third
  thirteen
  thirty
  threefold
  thrice
- threshold
- thrill
  thriller
- throat
- throng
- throttle
- through
  throughput
- throw
- thud
- thumb
  thumbnail
- thunder
- thus
- thy
- tick
- tide
- tie
- tight
  tightrope
  tights
- tile
- tilt
- timber
  timbered
  timberland
  timberyard
- time
  timeless
  timely
  timeliness
  timeout
  timeshifting
  timesink
  timespan
  timestream
  timesuck
  timework
  timeworthy
  timing
- tin
- tinder
- tinker
- tired
- tit (informal)
- tithe
- to
  toburst
  today
  todraw
  tofall
  tofore
  together
  togrind
  tohew
  tomorn
  tomorning
  tomorrow
  tonight
  toput
  toquake
  toreave
  torend
  toshake
  toshear
  toshend
  toshiver
  tostart
  tosunder
  toswink
  totear
  totread
  toward
  towind
  toyear
- toad
  toadstool
- toe
  toenail
- token
- toll
- tomboy
- tongue
- tooth
  toothache
  toothless
  toothy
- tow
- tower
- town, from OE tun.
  township
- trap
- tray
- tread
- tree, from OE trēow.
- trend
  trendsetter
  trendy
- trim
- troth
- truce
- true
- truth
- tuck
- tug
  tugboat
- tumble
  tumbleweed
- turd (informal)
- turf
- tusk
- tweak
- twig
- twilight
- twinge
- twink
- twinkle
- twist
- twit
- twitch
- two
  twelve
  twenty
  twice
  twofold

== U ==
- udder
- um
- umbe
- umbecast
- umbedraw
- umbego
- umbeset
- umbethink
- umbraid
- umgang
- umstroke
- umwhile
- un
  unbind
  unbury
  unclean
  uncouth
  undead
  undeadliness
  undeadly
  undo
  unearth
  uneath
  uneven
  unfair
  unfold
  unfriendly
  ungird
  unholy
  unkempt
  unknit
  unknot
  unlike
  unlock
  unseen
  untime
  untold
  unweather
- under
  underback
  underbake
  underbark
  underbear
  underbed
  underbelly
  underbite
  underblow
  underboard
  underbone
  underbook
  underbooked
  underbottom
  underbreak
  underbreath
  underbreathe
  underbreed
  underbrew
  underbrim
  underbring
  underbuild
  underburn
  underbust
  underbusy
  underbuy
  undercarve
  underclay
  undercliff
  undercloth
  underclothe
  underclothing
  undercome
  undergo
  underlay
  underling
  underneath
  underpant
  underscore
  underseek
  underset
  underside
  understand
  undertake
  underwear
  underwrite
- up
  upbraid
  upend
  updraw
  uphang
  upheave
  uphoard
  uphole
  upladder
  upland
  uplead
  uplean
  upleap
  upload
  uploom
  upmake
  upon
  uppercut
  uppluck
  uppricked
  upright
  uprise
  uproot
  uprush
  upshoot
  upshut
  upslope
  upspeak
  upspew
  upward
- utmost
- utter

== V ==
- vane
- vat
- vinew
- vixen

== W ==
- wacken
- wade
- wag
- wain
- waist
  waistband
- wake
- wald
- walk
  walker
  walkover
  walkthrough
- wall
- wallow
- walnut
- wan
- wander
  wanderlust
- wane
- wang "cheek, jaw"
- wangtooth "molar"
- want (mole)
- wanton
- ware
- wark
- warlock
- warm
- warn
- warp
- warry
- wart
- was
- wash
  washboard
  washer
  washhouse
  washout
- wasp
- watch
  watchman
  watchtower
- water
  waterborne
  watercress
  waterfall
  waterfowl
  waterway
  waterweed
  waterwort
- wathe
- watt
- wattle
- wave
  wavelength
- waw
- wax
- way
- waybread
- wayfare
- we
- weal
- weald
- wealth
  wealthful
  wealthfully
  wealthily
  wealthiness
  wealthy
  wealthless
  wealthlessness
- wean
- weapon
- wear
- weary
- weasel
- weather
- weave
- web
- wed
  wedded
  wedding
  wedlock
- wedge
- wee
- weed
- week
  weekday
  weekend
- ween
- weep
- weevil
- weight
  weightful
  weightfulness
  weightless
  weighty
- weird
  weirden
  weirdening
  weirdly
  weirdness
- welcome
- weld
  welder
  welding
- welkin
- well (noun)
- well (adj)
  wellness
- welter
- were "man"
- werewolf
- wem
- wench
- wend
- went
- west
  wester
  westerly
  western
  westerner
- westy
- wet
- whale
  whaleboat
  whalebone
  whalefish
  whalelike
  whaleling
  whalelore
  whaleman
  whaler
  whaleship
  whalesong
  whalespeak
  whalesucker
  whaling
- whan
- wharf
- wharve
- what
- whatever
- whatsoever
- wheat
  wheaten
- wheel
- whelk
- whelp
- when
- where
- wherefore
- whether
- whey
- which
- while
- whine
  whiner
  whining
  whiny
- whinge
- whirl
  whirligig
  whirlpool
  whirlwind
- whisk
  whisker
- whisper
- whistle
- white
  whitefish
  whitefly
  whitelist
  whiteshift
  whitesmith
  whitewash
- whittle
- who
- whole
  wholehearted
  wholemeal
  wholesome
- whore
  whoredom
  whorehound
  whorehouse
  whorelike
  whoreman
  whoreship
  whoreson
  whorish
- why
- wield
- wick
- wife
  wifekin
  wifeless
  wifelike
  wifeling
  wifely
  wifeliness
  wifeswapping
  wifey
  wive
- wight
- wild
  wildfire
  wildlife
- wile
- will
- wimple
- win
  winner
  winning
- wind
  windpipe
- wink
- winnow
- winsome
- winter
  wintercress
  wintered
  winterfeed
  wintersome
  wintersweet
  wintertide
  wintertime
  winterweed
  winterweight
  wintery
- wipe
- wire
  wirehead
- wis (also wiss) "certain, sure"
- wise
  wisdom
- wish
  wishbone
  wishful
- wisly
- wisp
- wit
  witty
- witch
  witchcraft
  witchdom
  witcher
  witchgrass
  witchhunt
  witchlike
  witchling
  witchweed
- with
  withbear
  withdraw
  withstand "with, back, against, see withhold"
  withsay
  withstay
  withtake
  withhold
- wither
- witness
- wizard
- wizen
- woad
- woe
- wold
- wolf
- woman
- womb
- wonder
  wonderful
- wone
- wonky
- woo
- wood
  woodcock
  woodcutter
  woodcutting
  wooden
  woodland
  woodpecker
  woodwork
  woodworking
- wool
  woolen
  woolpack
  woolwear
- word
- work
  workbench
  workflow
  workload
  workshop
  worktop
  workword
- world
- worm
  wormwood
- worry
  worrisome
- worse
- wort
- worth
  worthless
  worthwhile
  worthy
- would
- wrack
- wrath
- wreak
- wreath
- wren
- wrench
- wrength
- wretch
  wretched
- wright
- wring
- wrist
- write
  writer
  writing
- wroth
- wry
- wuss "juice"
- wynn
- wythe

== Y ==
- yammer
- yard
  yardbird
  yardfowl
  yardful
  yardland
  yardman
  yardwork
- yare
- yark
- yarn
- yarrow
- yawn
- yclept
- ye
- yean
- year
  yearday
  yearly
- yearn
- yeast
- yeke
- yell
- yellow
  yellowbird
  yellowhammer
  yellowtail
- yelp
- yeoman
- yes
  yesman
- yester
  yesterday
  yestereve
  yesterweek
  yesteryear
- yet
- yew
- yex
- yield
- yoke
- yolk
- yonder
- yore
- yote
- you
  your
  yourself
- young
- youth

== Z ==
- zax

== Notes ==
=== References ===
- Online Etymology Dictionary.
- Dictionary.com.

== See also ==
- Lists of English loanwords by country or language of origin
- List of Germanic and Latinate equivalents in English
- Linguistic purism in English
