= List of English words of Old Norse origin =

Words of Old Norse origin have entered the English language, primarily from the contact between Old Norse and Old English during colonisation of eastern and northern England between the mid 9th to the 11th centuries (see also Danelaw). Many of these words are part of English core vocabulary, such as egg or knife. There are hundreds of such words, and the list below does not aim at completeness.

To be distinguished from loan words which date back to the Old English period are modern Old Norse loans originating in the context of Old Norse philology, such as kenning (1871), (Note: There was a native Old English cenning "declaration" (in Middle English "cognition"), derived from the verb to ken The Old Norse kenning "set expression in early Germanic poetry" was loaned in 19th-century Germanic philology independently of the native word.) and loans from modern Icelandic (such as geyser, 1781). Yet another class comprises loans from Old Norse into Old French, which via Anglo-Norman were then indirectly loaned into Middle English; an example is flâneur, via French from the Old Norse verb flana "to wander aimlessly".

== A ==
ado
influenced by Norse at ("to", infinitive marker) which was used with English "do" in certain English dialects
aloft

- á ("=in, on, to") + lopt ("=air, atmosphere, sky, heaven, upper floor, loft")
- English provenance = c 1200 AD

anger

- angʀ ("=trouble, affliction"); root ang (="strait, straitened, troubled")
- English provenance = c 1250 AD

are
merger of Old English (earun, earon) and Old Norse (er) cognates
auk
A type of Arctic seabird.
awe

- agi ("=terror")
- English provenance = c 1205 AD (as aȝe, an early form of the word resulting from the influence of Old Norse on an existing Anglo-Saxon form, eȝe)

awesome
From the same Norse root as "awe".
awful
From the same Norse root as "awe".
awkward
the first element is from Old Norse ǫfugr ("=turned-backward"), the '-ward' part is from Old English weard
awn
From Old Norse ǫgn
axle
May be a combination of Old English eax and Old Norse ǫxull (="axis")

== B ==
bag
baggi
bait
beita
band
band (="rope")
bank (geography)
from a Scandinavian source such as Old Norse banki, Old Danish banke (="sandbank").
bark
bǫrkʀ
bash
From Old Norse *basca (="to strike")
bask
baðask reflex. of baða "bathe" (baðast, baða sig)
bat (animal)
probably related to Old Swedish natbakka, Old Danish nathbakkæ "night bat," and Old Norse leðrblaka "bat," literally "leather flapper".
berserk
berserkʀ, lit. 'bear-shirt', (alt. berʀ-serkʀ, 'bare-shirt') frenzied warriors
billow
bylgja
birth
byrðʀ
blather
Probably from a Scandinavian source such as Old Norse blaðra (="mutter, wag the tongue")
bleak
bleikʀ (="pale")
blend
Possibly from Old Norse blanda (="to mix")
blister
From a Scandinavian source via Old French
bloat
From a Scandinavian source akin to Old Norse blautʀ (="soaked, soft from being cooked in liquid")
bloom
"blossom of a plant," c. 1200, a northern word, from a Scandinavian source akin to Old Norse blomi "flower, blossom".
blunder
blundra (="shut one's eye")
blunt
Perhaps from or related to Old Norse blundra "to shut one's eyes"
boast
Probably from a Scandinavian source via Anglo-French
bole
From Old Norse bolʀ (="tree trunk")
both
baðir
boon
bon (="a petition, prayer")
booth
From Old Danish boþ (="temporary dwelling"), from East Norse *boa (="to dwell")
boulder
from a Scandinavian source akin to Swedish dialectal bullersten "noisy stone" (large stone in a stream, causing water to roar around it), from bullra "to roar" + sten "stone".
brink
Possibly related to Danish brink (="steepness, shore, bank, grassy edge")
brisket
perhaps from Old French bruschet, with identical sense of the English word, or from Old Norse brjosk "gristle, cartilage" (related to brjost "breast") or Danish bryske
brunt
Likely from Old Norse brundʀ (="sexual heat") or bruna =("to advance like wildfire")
bulk
bulki
bull
boli
bump
Perhaps from Scandinavian, probably echoic
bunker
possibly from a Scandinavian source such as bunke "boards used to protect the cargo of a ship"
bur
From a Scandinavian source related to Old Norse burst (="bristle")
bylaw
bylǫg ('by'=village; 'lǫg'=law; 'village-law')

== C ==
cake
kaka (="cake")
call
kalla (="cry loudly")
cart
From Old Norse kartʀ or a similar Scandinavian source
cast
kasta (="to throw")
chubby
Perhaps influenced by Old Norse kumba "log", kumben "stumpy".
clip
klippa (="to cut")
club
klubba (="cudgel")
clumsy
From a Scandinavian source akin to Old Norse klumsa (="make speechless, palsy; prevent from speaking")
cog
Probably a Scandinavian borrowing, related to Norwegian kugg
cozy
Likely of Scandinavian origin via Scots, perhaps related to Norwegian kose seg
crawl
krafla (="to claw")
craze
Possibly from Old Norse krasa (="shatter") via Old French crasir
creek
kriki ("corner, nook") through ME creke ("narrow inlet in a coastline") altered from kryk perhaps influenced by Anglo-Norman crique itself from a Scandinavian source via Norman-French
crochet
from Old Norse krokʀ "hook" via French crochet "small hook; canine tooth"
crocket
from the same Norse root as "crochet" via French.
crook
krokʀ (="hook-shaped instrument or weapon")
crotch
from Old North French croche "shepherd's crook," variant of croc "hook," from Old Norse krokʀ "hook".
crotchet, crotchety
from Old Norse krokʀ "hook" via Old French crochet.
crouch
from the same Norse root as "crochet" via French.
cur
kurra (="to growl")
cut
Possibly from North Germanic *kut-

== D ==
dangle
Probably from Scandinavian, related to Danish dangle, Swedish dangla (="to swing about") and Norwegian dangla
dank
Related to Swedish dank (="moist place") and dänka (="to moisten")
dash, dashing
Probably from a Scandinavian source (compare Swedish daska, Danish daske "to beat, strike")
dastard, dastardly
Probably from *dast, "dazed," past participle of dasen "to daze" or the equivalent past participle in Old Norse + deprecatory suffix -ard.
daze, dazed
Perhaps from Old Norse *dasa
die
deyja (="pass away")
ding
The meaning "to deal heavy blows" is c. 1300, probably from Old Norse dengja "to hammer," and is probably ultimately imitative.
dirt
drit (="feces")
down (feathers)
"first feathers of a baby bird; soft covering of fowls under the feathers, the under-plumage of birds," used for stuffing pillows and feather-beds, mid-14c., from Old Norse dunn, which is of uncertain origin.
doze
Probably from a Scandinavian source (compare Old Norse dusa "to doze," Danish døse "to make dull," Swedish dialectal dusa "to sleep").
dregs
dregg (="sediment")
droop
From Old Norse drupa (="to drop, sink, hang (the head)")
dump
Possibly related to Danish dumpe (="fall hard"), Norwegian dumpa (="to fall suddenly"), and Old Norse dumpa (="to beat"). Not found in Old English.

== E ==
egg
egg (="egg")
eider
a type of duck.
equip, equipment
skipa (="organize, arrange, place in order") through Middle French équiper, from Old French esquiper "fit out a ship, load on board", itself from Norman-French esquipper, eschiper

== F ==
fell (geography)
from Old Norse fiall "mountain"
fellow
félagi
filly
Possibly from Old Norse fylja, fem. of foli (="foal")
fir
from Old Norse fyri- "fir" or Old Danish fyr.
firth
From Old Norse fjǫrðʀ via Scottish
fjord
From Norwegian fiord, from Old Norse fjǫrðʀ (="an inlet, estuary")
flag
Probably from Old Norse flaka (="to flicker, flutter, hang loose")
flaneur
flana ("to wander aimlessly") + French suffix -eur through (19th cent.) French flâneur, itself from Norman-French flaner, flanner
flat
flatʀ
flaunt
Related to Swedish flankt (="loosely, flutteringly") and flakka (="to waver")
flaw
From Old Norse flaga (="stone slab, layer of stone")
fleck
Probably from Old Norse flekka (="to spot, stain, cover with spots")
fling
Probably from Old Norse flengja
flit
flytja (="cause to fit")
floe
From Norwegian flo (="layer, slab") from Old Norse flo
flounder
From Old Norse flyðra via Anglo-French floundre
fluster
Probably from a Scandinavian source related to Icelandic flaustr (="fluster")
fog
from Old Norse fok through Danish fog, meaning "spray", "shower", "snowdrift"
fond
uncertain but perhaps from Scandinavian
fro
from Old Norse fra (="from)
freckle
freknur (="freckles")
fry
Probably from Old Norse frjó
fun
from the same source as "fond"

== G ==
gab
gabbnna (="to mock") through Northern England dialect, Scottish or Norman-French
gable
from Old French gable "facade, front, gable," from Old Norse gafl "gable, gable-end" (in north of England, the word probably is directly from Norse).
gad
gaddʀ (="spike, nail")
gag
Perhaps influenced by Old Norse gag-hals (="with head thrown back")
gain
from Germanic and from Old Norse via Old French.
gait
Related to Old Norse gata (="way, road, path")
gale
Perhaps from Old Norse gol (="breeze") or Old Danish gal (="bad, furious")
gang
gangʀ (="act of going, a group of men")
gap
gap (="chasm")
gape
From an unrecorded English word or from Old Norse gapa (="to open the mouth wide, gape")
gasp
geispa (="to yawn")
gaunt
Perhaps from a Scandinavian source
gawk
from Middle English gawen, from Old Norse ga (="to heed")
gear
from Old Norse gǫrvi (="apparel, gear")
geld
from Old Norse gelda (="to castrate")
gelding
from Old Norse geldingʀ (="wether; eunuch")
get
geta, gat (got), gittan (gotten)
geyser
from Icelandic geysir, from Old Norse geysa (="to gush")
gift
gift (="dowry")
gill
Possibly related to Old Norse gjǫlnaʀ
girth
gjǫrð (="circumference, cinch")
give
gefa (="to give")
glitter
glitra (="to glitter")
gloat
From a Scandinavian source such as Old Norse glotta (="to grin, smile scornfully and show the teeth")
gosling
gæslingʀ (="goose")
grovel
Shakespearean term originating from Old Norse grufe
guest
gestʀ (="guest")
gun
from Old Norse Gunnhildʀ (female name, both elements of the name, gunnʀ and hildʀ, have the meaning "war, battle")
gust
gustʀ (="gust")

== H ==
haggle
haggen (="to chop")
hail
heill (="health, prosperity, good luck")
hank
Probably from a Scandinavian source such as Old Norse hǫnk (="a hank, coil")
hap, happy
happ (="chance, good luck, fate")
harness
From Old Norse *hernest (="provisions for an army") via Old French harnois
harsh
probably from Middle English harske "rough, coarse, sour" (c. 1300), a northern word of Scandinavian origin.
haunt
heimta (="to bring back home") through Anglo-Norman haunter (="to reside", "to frequent"), (Old) French hanter from Norman hanter.
haven
From Old Norse hǫfn (="haven, harbor")
hit
hitta (="to find")
how (or howe)
haugʀ (="barrow, small hill") Usage preserved mainly in place names
husband
husbondi (="master of the house")
hug
Possibly from Old Norse hugga (="to comfort")

== I ==
ill
illʀ (="bad")
irk
yrkja (="to work")

== J ==
jökulhlaup
from Icelandic jökulhlaup from Old Norse jǫkull and hlaup.
jarl
From Old Norse jarl

== K ==
kedge
Probably from a Scandinavian source or related to "cadge"
keg
From a Scandinavian source such as Old Norse kaggi (="keg, cask")
keel
kjǫlʀ
kenning
a descriptive phrase used in Germanic poetry, a modern learned word from Old Norse kenning in a special sense.
kick
Of uncertain origin, perhaps from Old Norse kikn (="bend backwards, sink at the knees")
kid
kið (="young goat")
kidnap
From kid + a variant of nab, both of which are of Scandinavian origin.
kilt
From Middle English kilten, from a Scandinavian source
kindle
kynda
knife
knífʀ

== L ==
lad
ladd (="young man (unlikely)")
lag
Possibly from a Scandinavian source, related to Norwegian lagga (="go slowly")
lass
From a Scandinavian source related to Old Swedish løsk kona (="unmarried woman") or Old Norse lǫskʀ (="idle, weak")
lathe
hlaða (="to load")
law
*lagu
leg
leggʀ
lemming
From Old Norse lómundʀ via Norwegian lemming
lift
lypta (="to raise")
likely
líkligʀ
link
*hlenkʀ
litmus
litmose (="lichen for dyeing", lita ="to stain")
loan
lán (="to lend")
loft
lopt (="an upper room or floor : attic, air, sky")
loose
lauss (="loose/free")
lope
From Old Norse hlaupa (="to run, leap, spring up")
low
lagʀ
lug
From Scandinavian, related to Swedish lugga and Norwegian lugge (="to pull by the hair")

== M ==
meek
From a Scandinavian source such as Old Norse mjúkʀ (='soft, pliant, gentle')
midden
Of Scandinavian origin, related to Danish mødding
mink
From a Scandinavian source, related to Swedish menk (="a stinking animal in Finland")
mire
mýrʀ (='bog')
mistake
mistaka (="miscarry")
mold (fungus)
related to Old Norse mygla "grow moldy"
muck
myki (="cow dung")
mug
mugge
muggy
mugga (="drizzle, mist")

== N ==
nab
Probably a variant of dialectal nap "to seize, catch, lay hold of", which possibly is from Scandinavian.
nag
Probably ultimately from a Scandinavian source, related to Old Norse gnaga (="to complain," literally "to bite, gnaw")
narwhal
From Danish and Norwegian narhval, probably a metathesis of Old Norse náhvalʀ, literally "corpse-whale," from náʀ "corpse"
nasty
Likely related to Swedish dialectal and Danish naskug, nasket "dirty, nasty".
nay, naysayer
From a Scandinavian source such as Old Norse nei
niggard, niggardly
Perhaps from a Scandinavian source related to Old Norse *hniggw, possibly via French
Norman, Normandy
from Old Norse through Old French, meaning "northman", due to Viking settlement in Normandy region
nudge
Perhaps from Scandinavian, related to Norwegian nugge/nyggje (="to jostle, rub") and Icelandic nugga (="to rub, massage")

== O ==
oaf
alfr (="elf")
odd
oddi (="third number", "the casting vote")
ombudsman
from Old Norse umboðsmaðʀ through Swedish ombudsman, meaning "commissary", "representative", "steward"
outlaw
utlagi

== P ==
peen
Probably from a Scandinavian source, related to Norwegian penn and Old Swedish pæna
plough, plow
plogʀ
prod
From Old Norse broddʀ (="shaft, spike")

== Q ==
queasy
Possibly from a Scandinavian source, such as Old Norse kveisa (="a boil") (Middle English Compendium compares Old Norse iðra-kveisa "bowel pains").

== R ==
race
rás (="to race", "to run", "to rush", "to move swift")
raft
raptʀ (="log")
rag
Probably from a Scandinavian source such as Old Norse rǫgg (="shaggy tuft, rough hair")
ragged
Related to "rag", perhaps from or reinforced by Old Norse raggaðr (="shaggy").
ragtag
From rag + tag, both component words being of Scandinavian origin.
raise
reisa
ransack
rannsaka (="to search the house")
reef
Likely from Old Norse rif (="ridge in the sea; reef in a sail") via Dutch riffe
regret
gráta ("to weep, groan") + French prefix re- through Old French regreter, itself from Old Norman-French regrater, regreter, influenced by Old English grætan
reindeer
hreindýʀi
rid
Possibly from Old Norse ryðja (="to clear (land) of obstructions")
rift
Related to Old Norse ripa/rifa (=""to tear apart, break a contract")
rig
Probably from a Scandinavian source. May be related to Danish/Norwegian rigge (="to equip") and Swedish rigga (="to rig, harness")
rive
rífa (="to scratch, plow, tear")
root
rót
rotten
rotinn (="decayed")
rug
rogg (="shaggy tuft")
rugged
rogg (="shaggy tuft")
rump
From a Scandinavian source related to Danish/Norwegian rumpe and Swedish rumpa

== S ==
saga
saga (="story, tale")
sale
sala
same
same, samʀ (="same")
scale
(for weighing) from skal (="bowl, drinking cup", or in plural "weighing scale" referring to the cup or pan part of a balance) in early English used to mean "cup"
scalp
From a Scandinavian source related to Old Norse skalli (="a bald head") or skalpʀ (="sheath, scabbard")
scant
skamt and skammʀ (="short, lacking")
scare
skirra (="to frighten)
scarf
skarfʀ (="fastening joint") ("scarf" and "scarves" have possibly been reintroduced to modern Swedish in their English forms as slang, but Swedes almost always use the compound "neck-cloth" (hals-duk).
scathe
skaða (="to hurt, injure")
scoff
From a Scandinavian source such as Old Norse skaup, skop (="mockery, ridicule")
scofflaw
From scoff + law, both of which are of Old Norse origin.
scold
From Old Norse skald (="poet")
scorch
Perhaps from Old Norse skorpna (="to be shriveled"). It was previously thought to be from Old French, but this is now considered unlikely.
score
skor (="notch"; "twenty")
scowl
Probably from a Scandinavian source, related to Norwegian skule (="look furtively, squint, look embarrassed") and Danish skule (="to scowl, cast down the eyes")
scrag
Related to Norwegian skragg "a lean person;" dialectal Swedish skraka "a great, dry tree; a long, lean man," skragge "old and torn thing," Danish skrog "hull of a ship; carcass," Icelandic skröggr, a nickname of the fox
scrap
skrap (="scraps, trifles") from skrapa
scrape
skrapa (="to scrape, erase")
scrawny
Of uncertain origin but probably from a Scandinavian source, such as Old Norse skrælna (="to shrivel")
scree
From Old Norse skriða (="landslide")
scuff, scuffle
Probably from a Scandinavian source related to Old Norse skufa, skyfa (="to shove, push aside"), via Scottish
seat
sæti (="seat, position")
seem
sœma (="to conform")
shrimp
Probably from or related to Old Norse skreppa (="thin person")
shrivel
Perhaps from a Scandinavian source and related to Swedish skryvla (="to wrinkle, to shrivel")
shrug
perhaps connected to Danish skrugge "to stoop, crouch."
silt
Probably from a Scandinavian source, related to Norwegian and Danish sylt (="salt marsh") and Old Swedish sylta (="mud")
skate
skata (="fish")
skeet
ultimately from Old Norse skjóta (="to shoot")
skerry
From Old Norse sker
skewer
Possibly from Old Norse skífa (="a cut, slice")
ski
From Norwegian ski, related to Old Norse skíð (="long snowshoe")
skid
Probably from a Scandinavian source akin to Old Norse skíð (="stick of wood")
skill
skil (="distinction")
skin
skinn (="animal hide")
skip
skopa (="to skip, run)
skirt
skyrta (="shirt")
skit
Perhaps ultimately from Old Norse skjúta (="to shoot, move quickly")
skitter, skittish
Perhaps relate to Old Norse skjóta
skive
From a Scandinavian source such as Old Norse skífa (="to cut, split")
skrike
skríkja (="to scream")
skua
from Faroese skugvur, related to Old Norse skúfʀ (="seagull, tuft, tassel"), and possibly to skauf (="fox's tail").
skull
skulle (="head")
sky
ský (="cloud")
skyscraper
From ský + scrape, both of which originate from Old Norse
slam
From a Scandinavian source, ultimately of imitative origin.
slang
Related to the verb slanger "linger, go slowly," which is of Scandinavian origin
slant
sletta, slenta (="to throw carelessly")
slaughter
*slahtr (="butchering")
slaver
slafra (="slaver")
sledge
sleggja (="sledgehammer")
sleight
slœgð
sleuth
slóð (="trail")
slight
Probably from a Scandinavian source akin to Old Norse sléttʀ (="smooth, sleek")
sling
From Old Norse slyngva
slob
From a Scandinavian source via Irish
slot
Perhaps from Old Norse slóð "trail" via Old French esclot "hoofprint of a deer or horse".
slouch
Related to Old Norse slókʀ ("lazy fellow")
slump
Probably from a Scandinavian source such as Norwegian and Danish slumpe (="fall upon,") Swedish slumpa; perhaps ultimately of imitative origin.
slush
Perhaps from a Scandinavian source, related to Norwegian and Danish slask (="slushy ground")
sly
slœgʀ (="cunning, crafty, sly")
smithy
From Old Norse smiðja
snag
From a Scandinavian source, related Old Norse snagi (="clothes peg")
snape
sneypa (="to outrage, dishonor, disgrace")
snare
snara (="noose, snare")
snipe
From Old Norse -snipa
sniper
From English snipe, which was derived from Old Norse
snub
snubba (="to curse")
snug, snuggle
Perhaps from a Scandinavian source such as Old Norse snoggʀ (="short-haired")
spike
perhaps from or related to a Scandinavian word, such as Old Norse spík "splinter," Middle Swedish spijk "nail".
sprint
spretta (="to jump up")
squabble
probably from a Scandinavian source and of imitative origin
squall
Probably from a Scandinavian source, such as Old Norse skvala (="to cry out")
stack
From a Scandinavian source akin to Old Norse stakkʀ (="haystack")
stagger
stakra (="to push")
stain
steina (="to paint")
steak
steik, steikja (="to fry")
stern (nautical)
probably from a Scandinavian source, such as Old Norse stjórn "a steering," related to or derived from stýra "to guide".
stoup
From a Scandinavian source such as Old Norse staup (="cup")
stumble
Probably from a Scandinavian source, may be related to Norwegian stumla, Swedish stambla (="to stumble")
swag
From a Scandinavian source akin to Old Norse sveggja (="to swing, sway")
swain
from Old Norse sveinn "boy, servant, attendant".
sway
sveigja (="to bend, swing, give way")

== T ==
tag
Probably from a Scandinavian source, related to Norwegian tagg (="point, prong, barb") and Swedish tagg (="prickle, thorn")
tangle
From a Scandinavian source, possibly related to Old Norse þongull
take
taka
tarn
tjǫrn, tjarn
tatter
From a Scandinavian source such as Old Norse tǫturʀ (="rags, tatters, tattered garment")
teem
tœma (="to empty")
tern
From a Scandinavian source akin via East Anglian dialect
tether
Probably from a Scandinavian source akin to Old Norse tjóðʀ (="tether")
their
þeirra
they
þeir
though
from Old English þēah, and in part from Old Norse þó (="though")
thrall
þræll
thrift
þrift (="prosperity")
thrive
From a Scandinavian source akin to þrifask (="to thrive", originally "grasp to oneself")
thrust
þrysta (="to thrust, force")
thwart
þvert (="across")
tidings
tíðindi (="news of events")
tight
þéttr (="watertight, close in texture, solid")
till
til (="to, until")
toft
From Old Norse topt (="homestead")
toom
tóm (="vacant time, leisure")
toss
Of uncertain origin, possibly from a Scandinavian source
trash
Perhaps from Old Norse tros (="rubbish, fallen leaves and twigs")
troll
troll (="giant, fiend, demon"; further etymology is disputed)
trust (verb)
traust (="help, confidence")
tryst
from Old French tristre (="waiting place, appointed station in hunting"), probably from a Scandinavian source such as Old Norse treysta (="to trust, make firm").
tyke
From a Scandinavian source akin to Old Norse tik (="bitch")

== U ==
ugly
uggligʀ (="Dreadfull, repulsive")
until
from Old Norse und (="as far as, up to") and til (="until, up to")

== V ==
valkyrie
from Old Norse valkyrja, literally "chooser of the slain," from valʀ (="those slain in battle") + kyrja (="chooser"), from ablaut root of kjósa (="to choose")
Viking
víkingʀ (="one who came from the fjords", vík = small and not deep fjord)
vole
Probably from Old Norse vǫllʀ (="field")

== W ==
wad
from Old Norse váðmál
wag
Probably from a Scandinavian source related Old Norse vagga (="a cradle")
waif
Probably from a Scandinavian source akin to Old Norse veif (="waving thing, flag") via Anglo-French waif
wail
From Old Norse væla (="to lament")
waive, waiver
from Anglo-French weyver "to abandon, waive" (Old French guever "to abandon, give back"), probably from a Scandinavian source akin to Old Norse veifa "to swing about".
walrus
A loanword from Dutch, but probably ultimately an alteration of a Scandinavian word.
wand
vondʀ (="rod")
want
vanta (="to lack")
wapentake
From Old Norse vapnatak
wassail
From Old Norse vas heill (="be healthy")
weak
veikr (="weak, pliant")
wheeze
Probably from a Scandinavian source such as Old Norse hvoesa (="to hiss")
whirl
hvirfla (="to go around")
whisk
viska (="to plait")
wicker
From a Scandinavian source, related to Danish viger and Middle Swedish viker
wicket
vík (="bay") + French suffix -et through Anglo-Norman wicket, itself from Old Norman-French wiket, Norman-French viquet > French guichet
wight
vígʀ (="able in battle") – the other wight meaning "man" is from Old English
wile
vél (="trick, craft, fraud")
windlass
vindáss (= "windlass", literally "winding-pole"), through Old Norman / Anglo-Norman windas, from vinda ("to wind") + áss ("pole").
window
vindauga (="wind-eye") – although gluggi was more commonly used in Old Norse
wing
vængʀ (="a wing")
wreck
From a Scandinavian source akin to Old Norse *wrek (="wreck, flotsam"), via Anglo-Norman wrec
wrong
rangʀ (="crooked, wry, wrong")

== Y ==
yaw
Perhaps ultimately from Old Norse jaga

== See also ==
- Lists of English words of international origin
- List of English words of Scandinavian origin
- List of English words of Norwegian origin
- List of English words of Danish origin
- List of English words of Swedish origin
- Old Norse language
- Old Norse orthography
