= List of English words of Swedish origin =

This is a list of English words borrowed from the Swedish language.

- aquavit, "a clear Scandinavian liquor flavored with caraway seeds"
- fartlek, "endurance training in which a runner alternates periods of sprinting with periods of jogging"
- gantelope, "gauntlet"
- glögg, "a hot spiced wine and liquor punch served in Scandinavian countries as a Christmas drink"
- gravlax, "salmon cured especially with salt, sugar, pepper, and dill and often additional ingredients (such as fennel, coriander, lime, and vodka or aquavit)"
- gyttja, "a lacustrine mud containing abundant organic material"
- lek, "an assembly area where animals (such as the prairie chicken) carry on display and courtship behavior"
- lingonberry, "(or better: linberry, since the sw. suffix means berry) a low-growing, evergreen shrub (Vaccinium vitis-idaea) of cooler, northern regions of North America and Europe that has leathery, oval leaves, white or light pink, bell-shaped, nodding flowers and red berries and is related to the blueberry and cranberry"
- moped, "a lightweight, low-powered motorbike that can be pedaled"
- ombudsman, "a person who investigates, reports on, and helps settle complaints; an individual usually affiliated with an organization or business who serves as an advocate for patients, consumers, employees, etc."
- orienteering, "a competitive or noncompetitive recreational activity in which participants use a map and compass to navigate between checkpoints along an unfamiliar course (as in the woods)"
- rutabaga, "a turnip (Brassica napus napobrassica) that usually produces a large yellowish root that is eaten as a vegetable"
- skarn, "contact metamorphic rock rich in iron"
- smörgåsbord, "a luncheon or supper buffet offering a variety of foods and dishes (such as hors d'oeuvres, hot and cold meats, smoked and pickled fish, cheeses, salads, and relishes)"
- strömming, "a small Baltic herring"
- tjäle, "or tjaele, frozen ground"
- torsk, "codfish"
- tungsten, "a gray-white heavy high-melting ductile hard polyvalent metallic element that resembles chromium and molybdenum in many of its properties and is used especially in carbide materials and electrical components (such as lamp filaments) and in hardening alloys (such as steel)"
- varve, "a pair of layers of alternately finer and coarser silt or clay believed to comprise an annual cycle of deposition in a body of still water"

== See also ==
- List of English words of Old Norse origin
- List of English words of Norwegian origin
- List of English words of Danish origin
- List of English words of Scandinavian origin
- Lists of English words of international origin
