= Železník (village) =

- Municipality
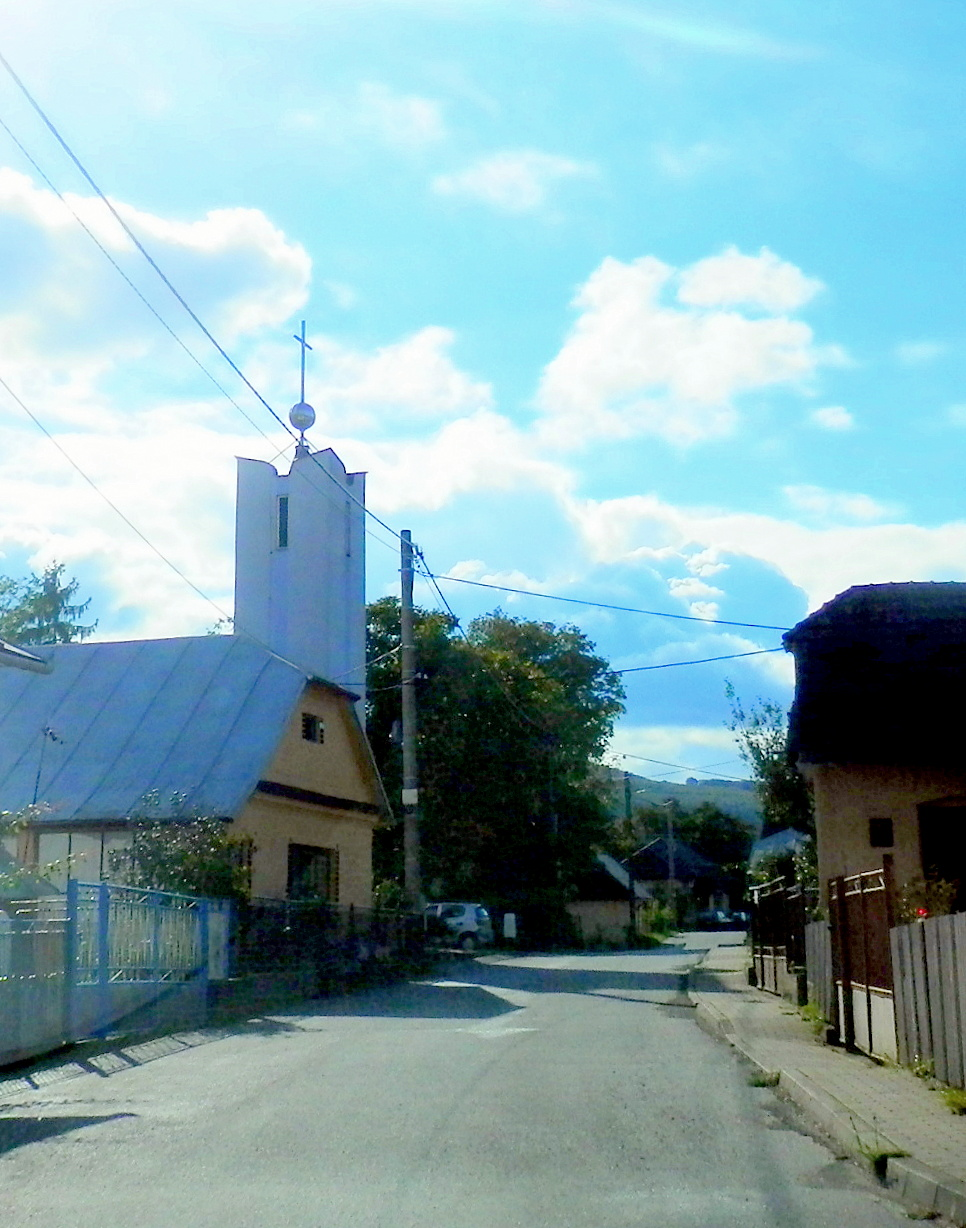

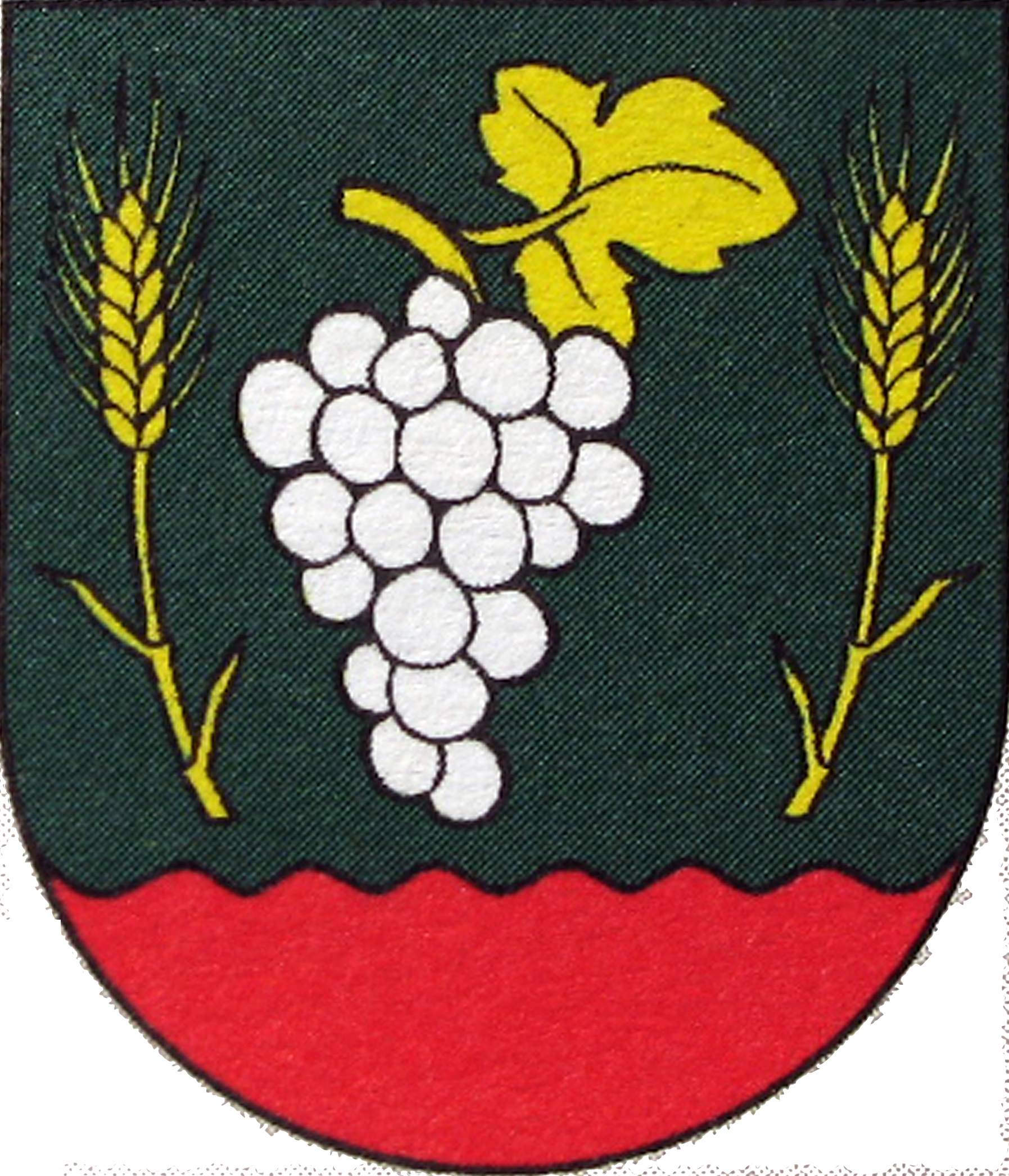
- Flag Coat of arms

- Location of Železník in the Prešov Region Location of Železník in Slovakia
- Coordinates: 49°06′N 21°30′E
- Country: Slovakia
- Region: Prešov Region
- District: Svidník District
- First mentioned: 1382

Area
  - Total: 5.96 km^{2} (2.30 sq mi)
- Elevation: 176 m (577 ft)

Population (2025)
  - Total: 457
- Time zone: UTC+1 (CET)
  - Summer (DST): UTC+2 (CEST)
- Postal code: 870 1
- Area code: +421 54
- Vehicle registration plate (until 2022): SK
- Website: zeleznik.sk

Železník (Hungarian: Vaspataka) is a village and municipality in Svidník District in the Prešov Region of north-eastern Slovakia. The municipality lies at an altitude of 180 metres and covers an area of 5.97 square kilometres (2.31 square miles). It has a population of about 465 people. When it was under Hungarian rule it was called Vashegy, which literally means “Iron Hill”, and the mineral vashegyite is named after this village.

== Geography ==
The municipality lies at an altitude of 176 metres (577 ft) and covers an area of 5.96 km^{2} (2.30 sq mi) (2025).

== History ==
In historical records the village was first mentioned in 1382.

== Population ==
Population statistic (10 years)
Year	1995	2005	2015	2025
Count	434	468	457	457
Difference		+7.83%	−2.35%	+0%

Population statistic
Year	2024	2025
Count	457	457
Difference		+0%

It has a population of 457 people (31 December 2025).

=== Ethnicity ===
Census 2021 (1+ %)
Ethnicity	Number	Fraction
Slovak	458	99.13%
Not found out	6	1.29%
Total	462	

In year 2021 was 462 people by ethnicity 458 as Slovak, 6 as Not found out, 3 as Romani, 2 as Rusyn, 1 as Czech and 1 as Polish.

Note on population: The difference values of population numbers in the table "Population statistic" and in the sections "Ethnicity" & "Religion" is caused by the use of various statistical methods.

=== Religion ===
Census 2021 (1+ %)
Religion	Number	Fraction
Evangelical Church	261	56.49%
Roman Catholic Church	164	35.5%
None	21	4.55%
Greek Catholic Church	11	2.38%
Total	462	

In year 2021 was 462 people by religion 261 from Evangelical Church, 164 from Roman Catholic Church, 21 from None, 11 from Greek Catholic Church, 3 from Not found out, 1 from United Methodist Church and 1 from Apostolic Church.
