= List of English words of Zulu origin =

This is a list of words of Zulu origin attested in use by speakers of South African English.

abatagati
(from abathakathi, a word also used in Xhosa; cf. synonymous umtagati, a borrowing into South African English from other Nguni languages) witches, warlocks, or other practitioners of magic for evil purposes
aikona
(from hhayi khona "not here") no; certainly not; not at all
baba
(from baba "father," a respectful form of address toward an older man) sir, mister
Fanagalo
(from the phrase fana ga lo "like this") a Zulu-based pidgin spoken primarily by South African miners
madumbi
(from amadumbe "taro tubers") taro tuber
umfundisi
a teacher, priest, or missionary

== See also ==
- South African English
- List of South African slang words
