= List of English words of Romani origin =

These are words in the English language which potentially come from Romani.

- chav (wikt:chav) – an anti-social youth (from chavi "child")
- cosh (wikt:cosh) – a weapon, truncheon, baton (from košter "stick")
- cove (wikt:cove) – British-English colloquial term meaning a person or chap (from kova "that person")
- cushty (wikt:cushty) – very good
- dick (wikt:dick) – detective (potentially from dik "look", "see" and by extension "watch")
- gadjo (masc) or gadji (fem) – a non-Romani
- nark (wikt:nark) – a police informer (from nāk "nose")
- pal (wikt:pal) – friend (from phral "brother")
- posh (wikt:posh) – fancy, upper-class (possibly from a Romani term for money)
- Romanipen – the spirit of being Romani, "Romani-ness"
- shiv (wikt:shiv) – an improvised knife or similar weapon (from chivomengro "knife")
- wonga (wikt:wonga) – Cockney slang for money (from angar "coal")
