= List of English words of Finnish origin =

The Finnish language has lent few loanwords to the English language; Finnish is rather a net importer of words from English.

However the following words of Finnish origin are some examples:

== Widespread ==
The most commonly used Finnish word in English is sauna, which has also been loaned to many other languages.

== Specialized ==
Words derived from Finnish used in more specialized fields:

- aapa mire - a marsh type, in biology
- palsa - low, often oval, frost heaves occurring in polar and subpolar climates
- pulk - a type of toboggan (derivative of word pulkka)
- puukko - traditional Finnish sheath knife
- rapakivi granite - a granite rock in petrology
- taimen - a species of salmon living in Siberia

== Cultural ==
In English, Finnish words used with reference to the Finnish culture, but not nativized in English and not used in other contexts:

- sisu - the Finnish state of mind about strong character and 'grim forbearance,' has been documented in English since at least 1940.
- kantele - a Finnish zither in the box zither family
- motti - a Finnish military tactic
- salmiakki - a salty liquorice and popular Finnish candy
- Kilju - a homemade alcoholic beverage

== See also ==
- List of English words of Sami origin
- Finnish name
- Finglish
- Finnish exonyms
