= List of pseudo-German words in English =

This is a list of pseudo-German words adopted from German in such a way that their meanings in English are not readily understood by native German speakers (usually because of the new circumstances in which these words are used in English).

- blitz or "the Blitz" (chiefly British use) – The sustained attack by the German Luftwaffe during 1940–1941, which began after the Battle of Britain. It was adapted from "Blitzkrieg" (lightning war). The word Blitz (a bolt of lightning) was not used in German in its aerial-war aspect; it acquired an entirely new usage in English during World War II.
  In British English, 'to blitz' is also used in a culinary context, to mean liquidise in a blender, a food processor or with a handheld blender stick.
- hock (British only) – A German white wine. The word is derived from Hochheim am Main, a town in Germany.
- nix – used as a verb (reject, cancel) in English but not in German; synonymous with eighty-six. From the German word nichts (nothing).
- Mox nix! – From the German phrase, Es macht nichts! Often used by U.S. service personnel to mean "It doesn't matter" or "It's not important".
- strafe – In its sense of "to machine-gun troop assemblies and columns from the air", strafe is an adoption of the German verb strafen (to punish). This probably comes from the slogan Gott strafe England ('May God punish England').
- Stein or Beerstein - A large mug, ceramic or glass, typical at Oktoberfest celebrations. In German, this is actually called a Krug, plural Krüge. Some Krüge are called Steinkrüge, based on the ceramic material they are made from, but they are never called just "Steine".

== See also ==
- Linguistic purism in English
- List of German expressions in English
- Pseudo-anglicism
