= Slavicism =

Loanword from a Slavic language

Slavicisms or Slavisms are words and expressions (lexical, grammatical, phonetic, etc.) borrowed or derived from Slavic languages.

== Distribution ==
=== Southern languages ===
Most languages of the former Soviet Union and of some neighbouring countries (for example, Mongolian) are significantly influenced by Russian, especially in vocabulary. The Romanian, Albanian, and Hungarian languages show the influence of the neighboring Slavic nations, especially in vocabulary pertaining to urban life, agriculture, and crafts and trade—the major cultural innovations at times of limited long-range cultural contact. In each one of these languages, Slavic lexical borrowings represent at least 15% of the total vocabulary. However, Albanian has much lower influence from Slavic than Romanian or Hungarian. This is potentially because Slavic tribes crossed and partially settled the territories inhabited by ancient Illyrians and Vlachs on their way to the Balkans.

=== Germanic languages ===
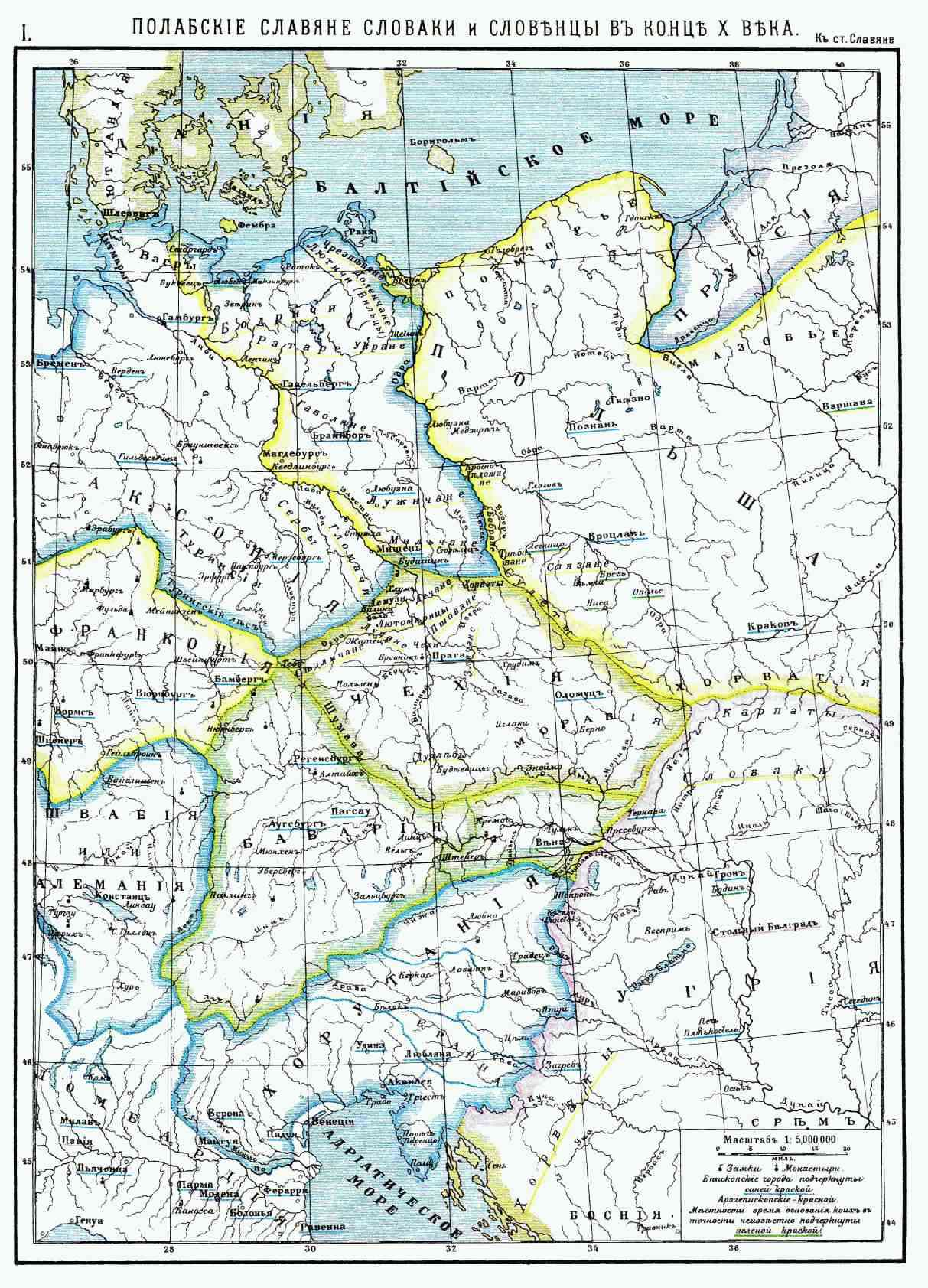
Slavic peoples on the territory of modern Germany and Austria at the end of the tenth century

Max Vasmer, a specialist in Slavic etymology, has claimed that there were no Slavic loans into Proto-Germanic. However, there are isolated Slavic loans (mostly recent) into other Germanic languages. For example, the word for "border" (in modern German Grenze, Dutch grens, Swedish gräns) was borrowed from the Common Slavic granica. There are, however, many German placenames of West Slavic origin in Eastern Germany, notably Pommern, Schwerin, Rostock, Lübeck, Berlin (some linguists don't agree that Berlin is a Slavic loanword), Leipzig and Dresden. English derives quark (a kind of cheese and subatomic particle) from the German Quark, which in turn is derived from the Slavic tvarog, which means "curd". Some German surnames, particularly in Eastern Germany and Eastern Austria, are Slavic in origin.

The Scandinavian languages include words such as torv/torg (market place) from Old Russian tъrgъ (trŭgŭ) or Polish targ, humle (hops), reje/reke/räka (shrimp, prawn), and, via Middle Low German, tolk (interpreter) from Old Slavic tlŭkŭ, and pram/pråm (barge) from West Slavonic pramŭ. The Scandinavian languages also has the word läkare/lege/læge/læknir/lækni (doctor) from Serbo-Croatian lekar/лекар, or Polish lekarz. There is also a word: lök/løk/løg/laukur/løkur from Russian лук (luk) or Serbo-Croatian luk/лук.

=== Uralic Languages ===
There are a number of borrowed Slavic words in the Finnic languages, possibly as early as Proto-Finnic. Many loanwords have acquired a Finnicized form, making it difficult to say whether such a word is natively Finnic or Slavic.

To date, a huge number of Slavicisms are found in the Hungarian language (Finno-Ugric in origin). This is due to the fact that the Hungarian language was largely formed on the basis of the Slavic substratum of the former Principality of Pannonia.

=== Others ===
The Czech word robot is now found in most languages worldwide, and the word pistol, probably also from Czech, is found in many European languages.

A well-known Slavic word in almost all European languages is vodka, a borrowing from Russian водка (vodka) – which itself was borrowed from Polish wódka (lit. "little water"), from common Slavic voda ("water", cognate to the English word) with the diminutive ending "-ka". Owing to the medieval fur trade with Northern Russia, Pan-European loans from Russian include such familiar words as sable. The English word "vampire" was borrowed (perhaps via French vampire) from German Vampir, in turn derived from Serbo-Croatian vampir, continuing Proto-Slavic *ǫpyrь, although Polish scholar K. Stachowski has argued that the origin of the word is early Slavic *vąpěrь, going back to Turkic oobyr. Several European languages, including English, have borrowed the word polje (meaning "large, flat plain") directly from the former Yugoslav languages (i.e. Slovene, Croatian, and Serbian). During the heyday of the USSR in the 20th century, many more Russian words became known worldwide: da, Soviet, sputnik, perestroika, glasnost, kolkhoz, etc. Another borrowing from Russian is samovar (lit. "self-boiling").

== Inside the Slavic area ==
Borrowings from one Slavic language to another are also noted within Slavic languages, for example, medieval polonisms and russicisms in the literary Ukrainian and Belarusian languages.

Following the baptism of Poland the Polish language was influenced by Czech brought by missionaries from the Kingdom of Bohemia.

Czech "wakers" (Czech: buditelé, "evocative") and Slovenian linguists of the late 19th century also turned to the Russian language in order to reslavicize their resurgent languages and clear them of foreign language borrowings. This was mainly due to the imposition of the German language on Slavic-speaking areas, and gave significant results (for example, the word vozduh ("air"), translated into Czech and Slovenian).

== See also ==
- Russianism — borrowing from the Russian language
- Bohemism — from the Czech language
- List of English words of Polish origin
- List of English words of Ukrainian origin
