= List of English words of Polish origin =

This is a list English words of Polish origin (Polonisms), that is words used in the English language that were borrowed or derived, either directly or indirectly, from Polish. Several Polish words have entered English slang via Yiddish, brought by Ashkenazi Jews migrating from Poland to North America. Other English words were indirectly derived from Polish via Russian, French, German or Dutch. The Polish words themselves often come from other languages, such as German or Turkish. Borrowings from Polish tend to be mostly words referring to staples of Polish cuisine, names of Polish folk dances or specialist, e.g. horse-related, terminology. Among the words of Polish origin there are several words that derive from Polish geographic names and ethnonyms, including the name Polska, "Poland", itself.

== Derived from common words ==
=== Directly ===
The following words are derive directly from Polish. Some of them are loanwords in Polish itself.

Word	Meaning	Etymology	References
Baba/Babka cake	A leavened coffee or rum cake flavored with orange rind, rum, almonds, and raisins	Polish babka ("yeast cake"), or diminutive of baba ("old woman")	AHD
Borscht	Beetroot soup	Polish barszcz	
Bigos	A Polish stew made with meat and cabbage	Polish bigos ← German begossen ("doused"), or German blei + guss ("lead pieces")	SWO
Britzka	A type of horse-drawn carriage	Polish bryczka, diminutive of bryka ("wagon")	
Bryndza	Polish traditional cheese	Polish traditional crumby type cheese	
Intelligentsia	Educated social class	Polish inteligencja	
Kasha	Buckwheat grain porridge type	Polish kasza	
Kabanos	Type of thin dry sausage	Polish kabanos	
Kevlar	Synthetic fiber	From the name of Stephanie Kwolek, Polish scientist	
Kielbasa	A seasoned smoked Polish sausage	Polish kiełbasa ("sausage") ← Turkish kül bassï ("grilled cutlet") ← Turkic kül bastï: kül ("coals, ashes") + bastï, ("pressed (meat)") from basmaq ("to press");	
Klotski	A sliding block puzzle	Polish klocki, plural of klocek ("toy block")	
Konik	A horse breed	Polish konik, diminutive of koń ("horse")	
Krakowiak	Polish national dance	Polish national dance from Krakow	
Krówka	Polish fudge type sweet	Diminutive of krowa, "cow"	
Kujawiak	Polish national dance	From the Polish region of Kujawy	
Makowiec	Type of rolled cake/bread	From Polish mak ("poppyseed")	
Mazurka	Polish national dance	From the Polish region of Mazowsze	
Mazurka	Type of cake	Polish cake from the Mazowsze region	
Mazurka	Classical music piece created by F.Chopin	Polish mazurek	
Marrowsky	Dated - A spoonerism	A Polish count's surname	OED
Oberek	Polish national dance	Polish oberek	
Ogonek	A hook-shaped diacritic	Polish ogonek ← diminutive of ogon ("tail") ← Proto-Slavic *ogonŭ (probably originally "that which drives away (flies and the like)"): *o-, ob-, ("around, on") + *goniti ("to push, chase, drive")	AHD
Oscypek	Polish traditional smoked cheese	Polish oscypek smoked cheese from the Tatra region	
Pączki	A Polish jam-filled doughnut	Polish pączki, plural of pączek ← diminutive of pąk ("bud")	AHD
Pierogi	A semicircular dumpling of unleavened dough with any of various fillings	Polish pierogi, plural of pieróg ("pie") ← Russian pirog ← Old Russian pirogŭ, from pirŭ ("feast") ← Proto-Slavic *pirŭ ← Proto-Indo-European *pō(i)-	AHD
Polish notation	Mathematical notation of operators/PN/NPN	Lukasiewicz notation	
Rendzina	Type of soils	From Old Polish rędzic to talk/tell	
Rogal	Polish crescent roll	Polish rogal - from róg, "horn"	
Sejm	Polish diet or parliament	Polish sejm ("diet, assembly")	OED
Solidarnosc	Political movement	Polish solidarność ("solidarity")	
Spruce	A type coniferous tree	Polish liet. z Prus, "from Prussia"	
Starka	Aged strong alcohol	Polish stary, "old"	
Zloty	Polish currency	Polish złoty ("golden"), from złoto ("gold") ← Proto-Indo-European ghel	AHD
Zubr	European bison living in Poland's primeval forest	Polish żubr, European bison	
Żurek	Polish traditional sour type soup	Polish żurek	

=== Indirectly ===
The following words are derived from Polish via third languages.

Word	Meaning	Etymology	References
Hetman	Historical - Polish, Czech or Cossack military leader	Ukrainian гетьман, het'man ← Polish hetman ← Czech hejtman ← dialectical German hötmann, hetmann (modern Hauptmann) ← Middle High German houbet ("head/high") + man ("man")	AHD
Horde	A nomadic tribe; a crowd or swarm	German Horde ← Polish horda ← Ukrainian горда/gorda ← Russian орда (ordá) ← Mongol or North-West Turkic ordï ("camp", "residence") ← Old Turkic ordu ("encampment, residence, court")	AHD
Gherkin	A small cucumber	Early Modern Dutch gurkijn (Modern gurkje), diminutive of gurk (+ kijn), aphetic variant of agurk, or possibly via Dutch agurken, plural of agurk, taken to English as singular a gurken, from Dutch agurk, variant of augurk ← German Gurken, plural of Gurk ← Slavic source, i.e. Polish ogórek, partial translation (with diminutive suffix -ek) of Byzantine Greek angourion ("watermelon, gherkin"), from diminutive of Late Greek angouros ("a grape(s)"), meaning "small, unripe fruit," from expressive alteration of Greek aōros ("out of season, unripe") ← Proto Indo-European	AHD, OED
Nudnick / Nudnik	A bore; a boring person	variant English noodnik ← Yiddish nudne + diminutive suffix -nik, from nudyen ("to bore") ← Slavic, either Russian нудный/núdnyj("tedious"), Ukrainian нудний/núdnýj ("tedious"), or Polish nudny ("boring") ← Old Church Slavonic ноудити/nuditi or нѫдити/nǫditi ("to compel") ← Proto-Slavic *nuda ← Proto-Indo-European *neuti- (“need”), from *nau- ("death, to be exhausted")	AHD
Quartz	A hard white or colorless mineral	German Quarz ← dialectical Old Polish kwardy (modern Polish twardy)	AHD, OED
Schav, schaf	A sorrel soup	Yiddish שטשאַוו, shtshav ("sorrel") ← Polish szczaw	AHD
Schlub, shlub	A clumsy, stupid or unattractive person	Yiddish zhlob/zhlub, "yokel", "boor" ← Polish żłób ("trough, blockhead")	AHD, MW
Schmatte, shmatte	A rag	Yiddish shmate ← Polish szmata	AHD
Schmuck, shmuck	A clumsy or stupid person	Yiddish shmok ("penis, fool") ← probably Old Polish smok ("snake/dragon") or German Schmuck ("Jewellery"); in either case, the German word highly influenced the English spelling.	AHD
Uhlan, ulan	A cavalryman	German Uhlan ← Polish ułan ← Turkish oğlan("boy, youth" / "servant"), from oǧul ("son") ← Old Turkic	AHD, MW
Vampire	Mythical creature	Polish "wampir, from Proto-Polish "wąpierz", it's the most archaic form of the word, entered English via German "Vampire" in the 18th century.	
Vodka	Alcoholic drink	Polish wódka, diminutive of woda, "water", invented in pagan Poland, word itself was adopted from Russian	

== Derived from geographic names and ethnonyms ==
Word	Meaning	Etymology	References
Alla polacca	Like a polonaise (in musical notation)	Italian alla polacca, "in the Polish manner, Polish style"	MW
Bialy	A flat, round baked roll or bagel topped with onion flakes	Polish bialy ← "white" short for bialystoker, "of Białystok", a town in northeastern Poland	AHD, MW
Cracovian	A mathematical symbol used in cracovian calculus	Polish krakowian ← Cracow, a city in southern Poland, former capital	
Cracovienne, krakowiak	A lively Polish folk dance	French (danse) cracovienne, "Kraków (dance)", feminine of cracovien, "of Cracow"; Polish krakowiak, "inhabitant of Kraków"	MW: cracovienne, MW: krakowiak
Crackowe, cracowe, crakow	A long, pointed shoe popular in the 14th-15th centuries	Middle English crakowe ← Cracow, the English name of Kraków	MW
Czech	Of or related to the Czech Republic or its people	Polish Czech, "a Czech or Bohemian man" ← Czech Čech	AHD
Mazurka	One of Polish 5 national dances, or a piece of music for such a dance	from Polish (tańczyć) mazurka, "(to dance) the mazurka", accusative of mazurek ← diminutive of Mazur, "inhabitant of Masovia or Masuria", regions in northeastern Poland	AHD, OED, SWO
Polack	A Pole; formerly a neutral term, now considered offensive (see also List of ethnic slurs)	Polish Polak, "Pole"	AHD, OED
Polonaise	Ceremonial, stately, marchlike Polish dance, one of the 5 national dances of Poland, or a piece of music for such a dance	French (danse) polonaise, "Polish (dance)", feminine of polonais, "Polish"	OED
Polonaise	A woman's overdress popular in the 18th century	French (robe à la) polonaise, "Polish (style dress)", feminine of polonais, "Polish"	OED
Polonaise	Sprinkled with browned butter and bread crumbs (of food, mostly vegetables)	French sauce a la polonaise, feminine of polonais, "Polish"	OED, MW
Polonium	Chemical element with atomic number 84	Medieval Latin Polonia, "Poland"	AHD
Polska	A Scandinavian folk dance or a piece of music for such a dance	Swedish polska ← feminine of polsk, "Polish"	MW
Poulaine	(The pointed toe of) a crackowe shoe (see above)	Middle French (soulier à la) poulaine, "Polish (style shoe)" ← feminine of poulain, "Polish"	MW
Varsoviana, varsovienne	A graceful dance similar to a mazurka	Spanish varsoviana ← feminine of varsoviano; French varsovienne ← feminine of varsovien; both from Medieval Latin varsovianus, "of Warsaw" (Polish: Warszawa), the capital city of Poland	MW

== See also ==
- List of English words of German origin
- List of English words of Russian origin
- List of English words of Turkish origin
- List of English words of Yiddish origin
- Lists of English words of international origin

== Sources ==
- AHD, "The American Heritage Dictionary of the English Language". Boston: Houghton Mifflin; New York: Battleby.com. 2000. (included in Dictionary.com)
- EB-1911, 1911 Encyclopædia Britannica – via Wikisource.
- OED, Herper, Douglas (November 2001). "Online Etymology Dictionary".
- MW, "Merriam-Webster Online". Merriam-Webster.
