= Yellow Boots (novel) =

Novel by Vera Lysenko

- Author: Vera Lysenko
- Language: English
- Publisher: Ryerson Press
- Publication date: 1954
- OCLC: 25432377
- LC Class: PZ4.L993 Ye

Yellow Boots is a 1954 novel by Canadian-Ukrainian author Vera Lysenko. The novel is considered the first English language novel written by a Canadian of Ukrainian descent.
