= Kasha =

Type of porridge

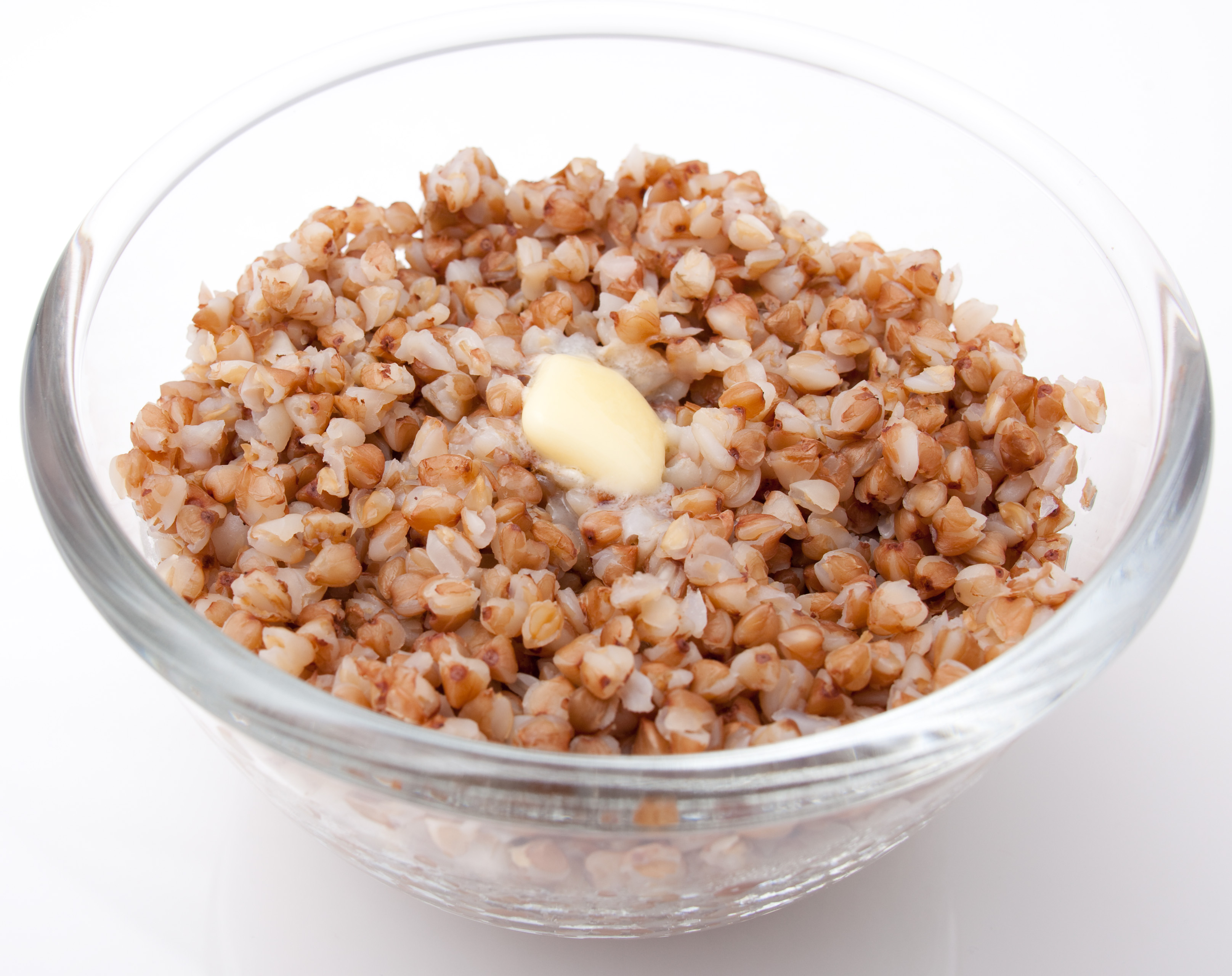
- Buckwheat kasha
- Type: Porridge, oatmeal
- Region or state: Eastern Europe
- Main ingredients: Cereal (buckwheat, wheat, barley, oats, millet or rye)

In English, kasha (/ˈkɑːʃə/) is a porridge usually made from buckwheat, a pseudocereal. In the Slavic languages, kasha means porridge. In some varieties of Central and Eastern European cuisine, kasha can apply to any kind of cooked grain. It can be baked but most often is boiled, either in water or milk, but the word can also refer to the grain before preparation, which corresponds to the definition of 'groats'.

== Etymology ==
The word kasha was borrowed from Russian kásha and first appears in English-language sources in 1808.

The English-language usage of kasha, which refers primarily to buckwheat, probably originated with Jewish immigrants, as did the form קאַשי kashi (literally translated as "porridges").

The word kasha is used in Belarus (каша), the Czech Republic (kaše), Hungary (kása), Lithuania (košė), Poland (kasza), Romania and Moldova (cașa), Russia (каша), Slovakia (kaša), Slovenia (kaša), Kazakhstan, and Ukraine (каша).

== In Ashkenazi Jewish culture ==
As an Ashkenazi Jewish comfort food, kasha is often served with onions and brown gravy on top of farfalle, known as kasha varnishkes. Kasha is a popular filling for knishes, and is sometimes included in matzah-ball soup.

== In Poland ==
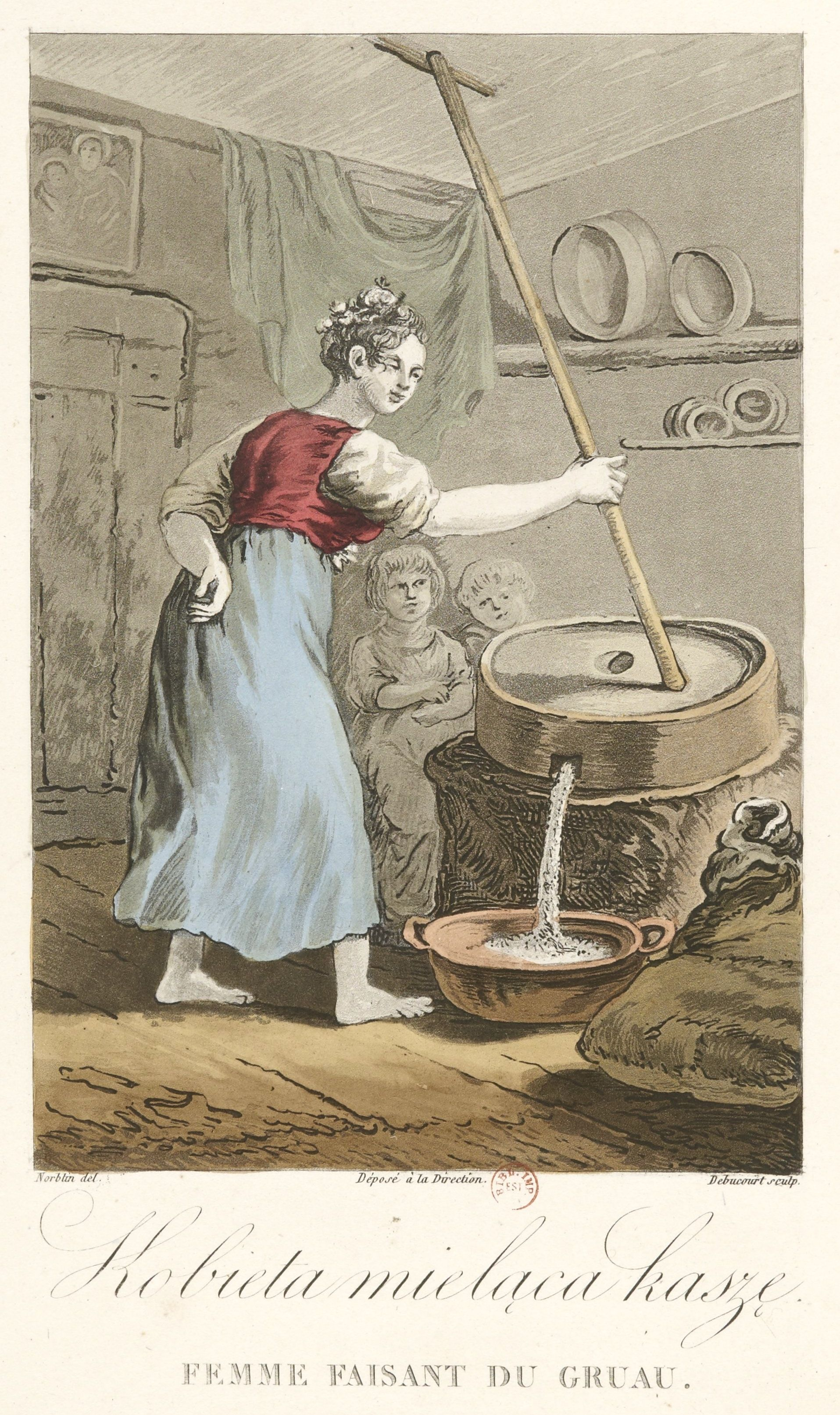
A woman grinding kasha, an 18th-century drawing by J.-P. Norblin

In Polish, cooked buckwheat groats are referred to as kasza gryczana. Kasza can apply to many kinds of groats: millet (kasza jaglana), barley (kasza jęczmienna), pearl barley (kasza jęczmienna perłowa, pęczak), oats (kasza owsiana), as well as porridge made from farina (kasza manna). Bulgur can also be referred to as a type of kasza in Polish (kasza bulgur).

As Polish blood sausage is prepared with buckwheat, barley or rice, it is called kaszanka (kasha sausage).

Annual per capita consumption of groats in Poland was approximately 1.56 kg (3.4 lb) per year in 2013.

== In Russia ==
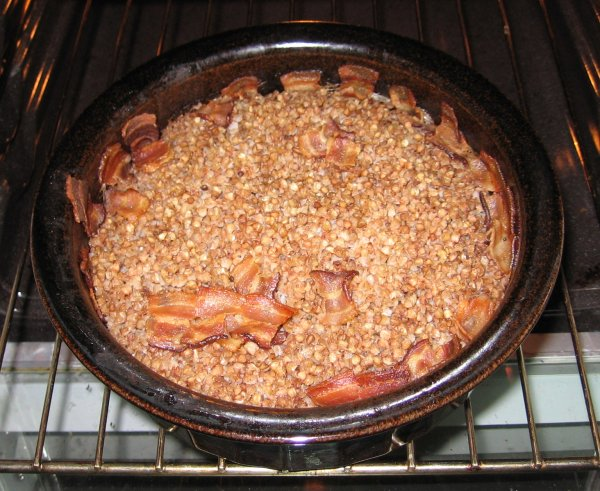
Buckwheat porridge made in oven

The largest gross buckwheat consumption per capita is in Russia, with 15 kg (33 lb) per year, followed by Ukraine, with 12 kg (26 lb) per year. Buckwheat comprises 20% of all cereal consumption in Russia.

In Russian, buckwheat is referred to formally as гречиха (grechi(k)ha), or colloquially as гречка (grechka), which gave rise to the Yiddish words gretshkes/greytshkelach and retshkes/reytshkelach.

Kasha is one of the Russian traditional dishes. Together with shchi it used to constitute staple foods for poorer people. This fact is commemorated in the Russian saying, "щи да каша – пища наша" (shchi da kasha – pishcha nasha), which literally translates as "shchi and kasha are our food".

Butter is often eaten with most kasha recipes, hence another Russian saying: "кашу маслом не испортишь" (kashu maslom ne isportish), which translates to "you cannot spoil kasha with butter".

== See also ==
- Grit
- Gruel
- Jewish cuisine
- Kaszanka
- List of ancient dishes and foods
- List of buckwheat dishes
- List of English words of Russian origin
- List of English words of Ukrainian origin
- List of porridges
- List of Russian dishes
