= List of English words of Russian origin =

Many languages, including English, contain words (Russianisms) most likely borrowed from the Russian language. Not all of the words are of purely Russian or origin. Some of them co-exist in other Slavic languages, and it can be difficult to determine whether they entered English from Russian or, say, Bulgarian. Some other words are borrowed or constructed from classical ancient languages, such as Latin or Greek. Still others are themselves borrowed from indigenous peoples that Russians have come into contact with in Russian or Soviet territory.

Compared to other source languages, English contains few words adopted from Russian. Direct borrowing first began with contact between England and Russia in the 16th century and picked up heavily in the 20th century, with the establishment of the Soviet Union as a major world power. Most of these words denote things and notions specific to Russia, Russian culture, politics, and history, but also well known outside Russia. Some others are in mainstream usage and independent of any Russian context.

Since both English and Russian are distantly related members of the Indo-European language family and therefore share a common ancestor, Proto-Indo-European, cognate pairs such as mother – мать (mat') will be excluded from the list.

== Common ==
-nik, a borrowed suffix (also used in Yiddish)

Babushka (Russian: ба́бушка [ˈbabuʂkə] "grandmother", "granny", or just an old woman), a headscarf folded diagonally and tied under the chin (this meaning is absent in the Russian language). Also unlike in the Russian language, the stress is made on the letter u instead of the first a.

Balalaika (Russian: балала́йка, [bəlɐˈlajkə]) A triangle-shaped mandolin-like musical instrument with three strings.

Balaclava (Russian: Балаклава) (Tatar origin) A knitted hat that covers the face, also known as a ski mask in the US and elsewhere. First used in the British army during the Crimean War of 1853–56. From the name of the town of Balaklava, Russianized Tatar 'Baliqlava'. This usage in Russian is fairly recent and comes from English.

Bridge (game) (from the Old East Slavic: бирич biritch).

Cosmonaut Russian: космона́вт (IPA [kəsmɐˈnaft]), a Russian or Soviet astronaut (from κόσμος kosmos, a Greek word, which in Russian stands for 'outer space' rather than 'world' or 'universe', and nautes – 'sailor', thus 'space sailor'; the term cosmonaut was first used in 1959; the near-similar word "cosmonautic" was coined in 1947). Cosmodrome (by analogy with aerodrome) was coined to refer to a launching site for Russian spacecraft.

Gulag (Russian ГУЛА́Г, acronym for Главное Управление Исправительно-Трудовых Лагерей и колоний) (Russian acronym for Glavnoye Upravleniye Ispravitelno-trudovykh Lagerey i kolonii, "The Chief Administration (or Directorate) of Corrective Labour Camps and Colonies".)

1. (historical) In the former Soviet Union, an administered system of corrective labor camps and prisons.
2. (figurative) A coercive institution or an oppressive environment.

Intelligentsia (Russian: интеллиге́нция [ɪntʲɪlʲɪˈɡʲentsɨjə]; from Latin intelligence, intelligentia from inter "between", and legare "to choose")

1. The part of a nation (originally in pre-revolutionary Russia) having aspirations to intellectual activity, a section of society regarded as possessing culture and political initiative; plural the members of this section of a nation or society.
2. In the former Soviet Union, the intellectual elite.

Kazakh (Russian: каза́х) (Russian, late-16th century, Kazak, from Turkic, meaning "vagabond" or "nomad", name of the ethnicity was transliterated into English from Russian spelling. The self-appellation is "Kazak", or "Qazaq"). Terms related to Kazakh people, their nation, and culture.

Knout (Russian: кнут [knut]) perhaps from Swedish knutpiska, a kind of whip, or of Germanic origin – Knute, Dutch Knoet, Anglo-Saxon cnotta, English knot) A whip formerly used as an instrument of punishment in Russia; the punishment inflicted by the knout.

Kopeck (Russian: копе́йка, [kɐˈpʲejkə]; derives from the Russian (копьё [kɐˈpʲjo] 'spear') a reference to the image of a rider with a spear on the coins minted in Moscow after the capture of Novgorod in 1478) A Russian currency, a subunit of the Ruble, 100 kopecks is equal to 1 ruble.

Kremlin (Russian: кремль [krʲemlʲ]; Russian for "fortress", "citadel", or "castle") A citadel or fortified enclosure within a Russian town or city, especially the Kremlin of Moscow; (the Kremlin) Metonym for the government of the former USSR, and to a lesser extent of the Russian post-Soviet government.

Mammoth (Russian: ма́монт mamont [ˈmamənt], from Yakut мамонт mamont, probably mama, "earth", perhaps from the notion that the animal burrowed in the ground) Any various large, hairy, extinct elephants of the genus Mammuthus, especially the woolly mammoth. 2. (adjective) Something of great size.

Matryoshka also Russian nested doll, stacking doll, Babushka doll, or Russian doll (Russian: матрёшка [mɐˈtrʲɵʂkə]). A set of brightly colored hollowed wooden dolls of decreasing sizes placed one inside another. "Matryoshka" is a derivative of the Russian female first name "Matryona", which is traditionally associated with a corpulent, robust, rustic Russian woman.

Pogrom (from Russian: погро́м; from "громи́ть" gromit "to destroy"; the word came to English through Yiddish פאָגראָם c.1880–1885) Definition of pogrom | Dictionary.com

1. (early-20th century) A riot against Jews.
2. (general) An organized, officially tolerated attack on any community or group.
3. (transitive verb) Massacre or destroy in a pogrom.

Ruble (Rouble) (from Russian: рубль rubl [ˈrublʲ], from Old Russian рубли rubli "cut" or "piece", probably originally a piece cut from a silver ingot bar (grivna) from Russian руби́ть, rubiti meaning "to chop". Historically, "ruble" was a piece of a certain weight chopped off a silver ingot (grivna), hence the name. An alternate etymology may suggest the name comes from the Russian noun рубе́ц, rubets, i.e., the seam that is left around the coin after casting. Therefore, the word ruble means "a cast with a seam".) The Russian unit of currency.

Sable (from Russian: sobol – со́боль [ˈsobəlʲ]. A carnivorous mammal of the weasel family, native to northern Europe and Asia.

Samovar (Russian: самова́р, IPA: [səmɐˈvar] (Russian само samo "self" and варить varit "to boil" hence "self-boil") A traditional Russian tea urn with an internal heating device for heating water and keeping it at boiling point.

Sputnik (historical, aside from the name of the program) (Russian: "спу́тник" – "satellite" (in space and astronomy), in Russian, its initial meaning is "travelling companion" from s "co-" + put "way" or "journey" + noun suffix -nik person connected with something; it means "satellite" when referring to astronomy-related topics). This term is now dated in English

1. In English, the best-known meaning is the name of a series of unmanned artificial Earth satellites launched by the Soviet Union from 1957 to the early 1960s; especially Sputnik 1, which on 4 October 1957 became the first human-made object to orbit Earth.

Taiga (Russian: тайга́, originally from Mongolian or Turkic). The swampy, coniferous forests of high northern latitudes, especially referring to that between the tundra and the steppes of Siberia.

Troika (Russian: тро́йка [ˈtrojkə] "threesome" or "triumvirate")

1. (mid-19th century) A Russian vehicle, either a wheeled carriage or a sleigh, drawn by three horses abreast.
2. A Russian folk dance with three people, often one man and two women.
3. (historical) a) In the former Soviet Union, a commission headed by three people; especially NKVD Troika. b) In the former Soviet Union, a group of three powerful Soviet leaders; especially referring to the 1953 troika of Georgy Malenkov, Lavrentiy Beria, and Vyacheslav Molotov that briefly ruled the Soviet Union after the death of Stalin.
4. A group of three people or things working together, especially in an administrative or managerial capacity.

Tundra (Russian: тундра, originally from Sámi languages). An Arctic steppe.

Ushanka (Russian: уша́нка [uˈʂaŋkə]), or shapka-ushanka, the word derives from Russian "уши" "ushi" – ears (and also flaps of ushanka). Ear-flapped hat, a type of cap (Russian: ша́пка shapka) made of fur with ear flaps that can be tied up to the crown of the cap or tied at the chin to protect the ears from the cold.

== Cuisine ==
Beef Stroganoff or Stroganov (Russian: бефстроганов, tr. befstróganov) A Russian dish of sautéed pieces of beef served in a sauce with smetana (sour cream).

Blini (Russian plural: блины, singular: блин). Thin pancakes or crepes traditionally made with yeasted batter, although non-yeasted batter has become widespread in recent times. Blini are often served in connection with a religious rite or festival, but also constitute a common breakfast dish.

Coulibiac (origin 1895–1900, from Russian: кулебя́ка kulebyáka, an oblong loaf of fish, meat, or vegetables, baked in a pastry shell; of uncertain origin). A Russian fish pie typically made with salmon or sturgeon, hard-boiled eggs, mushrooms, and dill, baked in a yeast or puff pastry shell.

Kefir (Russian: кефи́р [kəˈfir]). A fermented milk drink made with kefir "grains" (a yeast/bacterial fermentation starter) that has its origins in the north Caucasus Mountains.

Medovukha (Russian: медову́ха, from мёд) [Proto-Indo-European meddhe, "honey"]). A Russian honey-based alcoholic beverage similar to mead.

Okroshka (Russian: окро́шка) from Russian "kroshit" (крошить) meaning to chop (into small pieces). A type of Russian cold soup with mixed raw vegetables and kvass.

Pavlova A meringue dessert topped with whipped cream and fresh fruit, popular mainly in Australia and New Zealand; named after the Russian ballet dancer Anna Pavlova. Pavlova Cake history

Pelmeni (Russian plural: пельме́ни, singular пельме́нь, pelmen′ from Udmurt: пельнянь "ear[-formed] bread"). An Eastern European dumpling made with minced meat, especially beef and pork, wrapped in thin dough and cooked similarly to pasta.

Pirozhki (Russian plural: пирожки́, singular пирожо́к). An Eastern European baked or fried bun stuffed with a variety of fillings.

Rassolnik (Russian: рассольник). A hot soup in a salty-sour cucumber base.

Ryazhenka (Russian: ряженка). Traditional fermented milk beverage made from baked milk using lactic acid fermentation.

Sbiten (Russian: сби́тень) A traditional Russian honey-based drink similar to Medovukha.

Sevruga (Russian: севрю́га) A caviar from the sevruga, a type of sturgeon found only in the Caspian and Black Seas.

Shchi (Russian: щи) A type of cabbage soup.

Solyanka (Russian: соля́нка; [sɐˈlʲankə]). A thick, spicy, and sour Russian soup that is common in Russia and other states of the former Soviet Union and certain parts of the former Eastern Bloc.

Ukha (Russian: уха). A clear Russian soup made from various types of fish such as bream, wels catfish, northern pike, or even ruffe.

Vareniki (Russian plural: вареники, singular: вареник; "var" from Old Russian "варить" – to boil). A type of pasta parcel traditionally filled with mashed potatoes, cabbage, cottage cheese, or cherries, and then boiled in a similar way to pasta.

== Political and administrative ==
Active measures (Russian: активные мероприятия, romanized: aktivnye meropriyatiya) is political warfare conducted by the Soviet or Russian government since the 1920s. It includes offensive programs such as disinformation, propaganda, deception, sabotage, destabilization, and espionage.

Agitprop (Russian: агитпро́п; blend of Russian агита́ция agitatsiya "agitation" and пропага́нда propaganda "propaganda"; origin – 1930's, from shortened form of отде́л агита́ции и пропага́нды, transliteration otdel agitatsii i propagandy, ('Department for Agitation and Propaganda'), which was part of the Central and regional committees of the Communist Party of the Soviet Union. The department was later renamed Ideological Department.)

- Political (originally communist) propaganda

Apparatchik plural apparatchiki (Russian: аппара́тчик) [ɐpɐˈrat͡ɕɪk] (from Russian аппара́т apparat in sense of "gosudarstvenniy apparat" ["state machine"])

- Common name given to state (governmental) organs and the Communist Party, which was the leading and most powerful part of the state machine in the former Soviet Union. The word "apparat" derives from "apparatus", which itself stems from the Latin apparare, "to make ready".

Bolshevik (Russian большеви́к) [bəlʲʂɨˈvʲik] (from Russian "большинство́", "bolshinstvo" – majority, which derives from "бо́льше" bol'she – 'more', 'greater'.

- (historical) A member of the majority faction of the Russian Social Democratic Party, which was renamed to the Russian Communist Party (Bolsheviks) after seizing power in the October Revolution in 1917.
- (chiefly derogatory) (in general use) A person with politically subversive or radical views; a revolutionary.
- (adjective) Relating to or characteristic of Bolsheviks or their views or policies.

Cheka (Russian: Всероссийская чрезвычайная комиссия по борьбе с контрреволюцией и саботажем, acronym for The All-Russian Extraordinary Commission for Combating Counter-Revolution, Speculation, and Sabotage, abbreviated to Cheka (Chrezvychaynaya Komissiya, ChK; Чрезвычайная Комиссия, ЧК – pronounced "Che-Ká") or VCheka; In 1918, its name was slightly altered to "All-Russian Extraordinary Commission for Combating Counter-Revolution, Profiteering and Corruption"). The first Soviet state security organization (1917–1922), it was later transformed and reorganized into the GPU.

Commissar (Russian комисса́р) (Russian комиссариа́т commissariat, reinforced by medieval Latin commissariatus, both from medieval Latin commissarius "person in charge", from Latin committere "entrust". The term "commissar" was first used in 1918)

1. An official of the communist party, especially in the former Soviet Union or present-day China, responsible for political education and organization; a head of a government department in the former Soviet Union before 1946, when the title was changed to "Minister".
2. (figurative) A strict or prescriptive figure of authority.

Disinformation is a loan translation of the Russian dezinformatsiya (дезинформа́ция), derived from the title of a KGB black propaganda department. Disinformation was defined in the Great Soviet Encyclopedia (1952) as "false information with the intention to deceive public opinion".

Druzhina also Druzhyna, Drużyna (Russian and Ukrainian: дружи́на) (Slavic drug (друг) meaning "companion" or "friend", related to Germanic drotiin, Proto-Germanic druhtinaz, meaning "war band") (historical) A detachment of select troops in East Slavic countries who performed service for a chieftain, later knyaz. Its original functions were bodyguarding, raising tribute from conquered territories, and serving as the core of an army during war campaigns. In Ukrainian, the word дружина means legal wife.

Duma (Russian: ду́ма) (from the Russian ду́мать dumat', "to think" or "to consider")

1. (historical) A pre-19th century advisory municipal council in Russia, later referring to any of the four elected legislative bodies established due to popular demand in Russia from 1906 to 1917.
2. The legislative body in the ruling assembly of Russia (and some other republics of the former Soviet Union) established after the fall of communism in 1993.

The State Duma (Russian: Государственная дума (Gosudarstvennaya duma), common abbreviation: Госду́ма (Gosduma)) in the Russian Federation is the lower house of the Federal Assembly of Russia (legislature), the upper house being the Federation Council of Russia.

Dyak (clerk) (Russian дьяк), diminutive – Dyachok (Russian дьячо́к) (historical) One of the church workers in Russia who were not part of the official hierarchy of church offices and whose duties included reading and singing.

Glasnost (Russian: гла́сность [ˈɡlasnəsʲtʲ]; glasnost – publicity, from "гласный" "glasniy" – public, from glas voice, from Old Church Slavonic glasu). Late-20th century official policy in the former Soviet Union (especially associated with Mikhail Gorbachev) emphasizing transparency and openness with regard to discussion of social problems and shortcomings.

Glavlit (Russian acronym for Main Administration for Literary and Publishing Affairs, later renamed Main Administration for the Protection of State Secrets in the Press of the Council of Ministers of the USSR. Russian: Главное управление по охране государственных тайн в печати ГУОГТП (ГУОТ), trans. Glavnoe upravlenie po okhrane gosudarstvennykh tayn v pechati) (historical) The official censorship and state secret protection organ in the Soviet Union.

Kadet (Russian: Конституционно-демократическая партия, The Constitutional Democratic Party or Constitutional Democrats, formally Party of Popular Freedom, informally called Kadets, or Cadets, from the abbreviation K-D of the party name [the term was political and not related to military students, who are called cadets]) (historical) A liberal political party in Tsarist Russia founded in 1905; it largely dissolved after the Russian Civil War.

Khozraschyot or Khozraschet (Russian: хозрасчёт, хозя́йственный расчёт, literally "economic accounting") A method of the planned running of an economic unit (i.e., of a business, in Western terms) based on the confrontation of the expenses incurred in production with the production output, on the compensation of expenses using production-derived income; often referred to as the attempt to simulate the capitalist concepts of profit into the planned economy of the Soviet Union.

Kolkhoz plural kolkhozy (Russian: колхо́з, [kɐlˈxos]; 1920s origin. Russian contraction of коллекти́вное хозя́йство, kol(lektivnoe) khoz(yaisto) "collective farm") A form of collective farming in the former Soviet Union.

Kompromat (Russian: компрометирующий материал) contraction of 'compromising' and 'material'. Refers to disparaging information that can be collected, stored, traded, or used strategically across all domains: political, electoral, legal, professional, judicial, media, and business. The origins of the term trace back to 1930s secret police jargon.

Korenizatsiya also korenization (Russian: корениза́ция) (Russian, meaning "nativization" or "indigenization", literally "putting down roots", from the Russian term коренно́е населе́ние korennoye naseleniye "root population")

Kulak (Russian: кула́к, literally "fist", meaning "tight-fisted") Originally a prosperous Russian landed peasant in czarist Russia, later the term was used with hostility by Communists during the October Revolution to refer to an exploiter and strong adherent of private property and liberal values, this being the opposite of communist values; they were severely repressed under the rule of Joseph Stalin in the 1930s.

Krai also Kray (Russian: край, 1. edge. 2.1. country, land (as poetic word). 2.2. krai, territory (as adm.-terr. unit).) Term for eight of Russia's 85 federal subjects, often translated as territory, province, or region.

Leninism (Russian: ленини́зм) (after Vladimir Lenin, the term was coined in 1918) The political, economic, and social principles and practices of the Russian revolutionary Vladimir Lenin, especially his theory of government, which formed the basis for Soviet communism.

Lishenets (Russian: лише́нец) (from Russian лишение, "deprivation", properly translated as disenfranchised) (historical) A certain group of people in the Soviet Union who, from 1918 to 1936, were prohibited from voting and denied other rights.

Maskirovka (Russian: маскировка) (literally 'disguise') is a Russian military doctrine developed from the start of the twentieth century. The doctrine covers a broad range of measures for military deception, from camouflage to denial and deception.

Menshevik (Russian: меньшеви́к) (from Russian word меньшинство́ menshinstvo, "minority", from ме́ньше men'she "less"; the name Menshevik was coined by Vladimir Lenin when the party was (atypically) in the minority for a brief period) (historical) A member of the non-Leninist wing of the Russian Social Democratic Workers' Party, opposed to the Bolsheviks, who defeated them during the Russian Civil War that followed the 1917 Russian Revolution.

Mir (Russian: мир) (from Russian mir, meaning both "world" and "peace")

- (historical) A peasant farming commune in pre-Revolutionary Russia.
- Mir, a space station created by the former Soviet Union and continued by Russia until 2001.

Namestnik (Russian: наме́стник, [nɐˈmʲesnʲɪk]; Russian, literally "deputy" or "lieutenant") (historical)

1. (12th–16th century) An official who ruled an uyezd and was in charge of local administration.
2. (18th–20th century) A type of viceroy in Russia who ruled a namestnichestvo and had plenipotentiary powers.

Narkompros (Russian: Наркомпро́с) (Russian Народный комиссариат просвещения, an abbreviation for the People's Commissariat for Enlightenment (historical) The Soviet Union agency charged with the administration of public education and most other issues related to culture, such as literature and art. Founded by the Bolsheviks during the Russian Revolution, it was renamed in 1946 to the Ministry of Enlightening.

Narodniks (Russian: plural наро́дники, singular наро́дник) (from Russian narod, "people", in turn from the expression "хождение в народ", meaning "going to the people") (historical) The name for Russian revolutionaries (active from the 1860s to the 1880s) that looked on the peasants and intelligentsia as revolutionary forces, rather than the urban working class.

NEP or The New Economic Policy (NEP) (Russian: нэп, acronym for но́вая экономи́ческая поли́тика novaya ekonomicheskaya politika) (historical) An economic policy instituted in 1921 by Lenin to attempt to rebuild industry, especially agriculture. The policy was later reversed by Stalin.

Nomenklatura (Russian: номенклату́ра) (Russian nomenklatura, from the Latin nomenclatura, meaning a list of names) (historical) In the former Soviet Union, a list of influential posts in government and industry to be filled by Communist Party appointees; collectively the holders of these posts, the Soviet élite.

Oblast (Russian: область) A type of administrative division

Obshchina (Russian: ́община, общи́на) (Russian о́бщий obshchiy common, commune) Russian peasant agrarian communities during Imperialist Russia.

Obtshak (Russian: обща́к) In criminal jargon, a mutual aid fund in the environment of a criminal community.

Okhrana in full: The Okhrannoye otdeleniye (Russian: Охра́нное отделе́ние) (Russian, literally "protection section") (historical) The secret police organization (established in the 1860s) for protection of the Russian czarist regimes. It ended with the Bolshevik takeover of Russia in 1917; the Bolsheviks set up their own secret police organization, called the Cheka.

Okrug (Russian: о́круг) (Russian okrug is similar to the German word Bezirk ("district"), both referring to something that is "encircled").

- In the former Soviet Union, an administrative division of an oblast and krai
- A federal district in the present-day Russian Federation

Oprichnina (Russian: опри́чнина) (from the obsolete Russian word опричь, oprich, meaning "apart from" or "separate") (historical) Term for the domestic policy of Russian czar Ivan the Terrible.

Oprichnik plural Oprichniki (Russian: опри́чник) (historical) Name given to the bodyguards of Ivan the Terrible, who ruthlessly suppressed any opposition to his reign.

Perestroika (Russian: перестро́йка) (Russian perestroika, literally "restructuring"; the term was first used in 1986) The reform of the political and economic system of the former Soviet Union, first proposed by Leonid Brezhnev at the 26th Communist Party Congress in 1979 and later actively promoted by Mikhail Gorbachev from 1985.

Podyachy (Russian: подья́чий) (Russian, from the Greek υποδιακονος (hypodiakonos), "assistant servant") (historical) An office occupation in prikazes (local and upper governmental offices) and lesser local offices of Russia from the 15th to the 18th century.

Politburo (Russian Политбюро́ politbyuro, from Полити́ческое бюро́ polit(icheskoe) byuro, "political bureau") (historical) The principal policymaking committee in the former Soviet Union that was founded in 1917; also known as the Presidium from 1952 to 1966.

Posadnik (Russian: поса́дник) (from Old Church Slavic posaditi, meaning to put, or place, since originally, they were placed in the city to rule on behalf of the prince of Kiev) (historical) A mayor (equivalent to a stadtholder, burgomaster, or podestà in the medieval West) in some East Slavic cities, notably in the Russian cities of Novgorod and Pskov; the title was abolished in the 15th and 16th centuries.

Praporshchik (Russian: пра́порщик) (from Slavonic prapor (прапор), meaning flag, since the praporshchik was a flag-bearer among Kievan Rus troops) The name of a junior officer position in the military of the Russian Empire equivalent to ensign. Nowadays, this rank is used by the modern Russian army, police, and FSB and is equivalent to warrant officer.

Prikaz (Russian: прика́з)

1. (historical) An administrative (palace, civil, military, or church) or judicial office in Muscovy and Russia of 15th–18th centuries; abolished by Peter the Great.
2. In modern Russian, an administrative or military order (to do something).

Propiska (Russian: пропи́ска) (Russian full term пропи́ска по ме́сту жи́тельства, "The record of place of residence", from the Russian verb propisat "to write into", in reference to writing a passport into a registration book of the given local office) (historical) A regulation promulgated by the Russian czar designed to control internal population movement by binding a person to his or her permanent place of residence. Abolished by Lenin but later reinstated under Stalin in the Soviet Union.

Silovik (Russian: силови́к), plural siloviks or siloviki (Russian: силовики́) (from Russian си́ла sila, "strength", "force") A collective name for ministers, generals, and other officials of "силовые ведомства" "siloviye vedomstva" – force departments – ministries and other departments that have arms (weapons) and ability to use armed force, such as the army, FSB (KGB), or MVD (police). The term siloviks is often used to highlight or suggest their inclination to use force to solve problems.

Soviet (Russian: сове́т) (Russian sovet, "council") (historical)

- A revolutionary council of workers or peasants in Russia before the 1917 Revolution
- An elected local, district, or national council in the former Soviet Union
- A citizen in the former Soviet Union
- Of or concerning the former Soviet Union

Sovkhoz plural sovkhozes (Russian: совхо́з) (Russian сове́тское хозя́йство, (Sov) eckoje (khoz)yaistvo, "Soviet farm")

- (historical) A state-owned farm in the former Soviet Union
- A state-owned farm in countries of the former Soviet Union

Sovnarkhoz (Russian: Совнархо́з) (Russian сове́т наро́дного хозя́йства, sovet narodnogo hozyaistva, Council of National Economy, usually translated as "Regional Economic Council") (historical) An organization of the former Soviet Union to manage a separate economic region.

Sovnarkom (Russian: Сове́т Мини́стров СССР) (Russian Sovet Ministrov SSSR, Council of Ministers of the USSR, sometimes abbreviated as Совми́н Sovmin; between 1918 and 1946, it was named the Council of People's Commissars of the USSR (Совет Народных Комиссаров СССР, Russian Sovet Narodnykh Komissarov SSSR, sometimes Sovnarkom or SNK).) (historical) In the former Soviet Union, the highest executive and administrative body.

Spetsnaz or Specnaz (Russian: Войска́ специа́льного назначе́ния – спецна́з) or Russian special purpose regiments (Voyska spetsialnogo naznacheniya) A general term for police or military units within the Soviet Union (later Russian Federation) who engage in special activities; similar to commando.

Stakhanovite (Russian: стаха́новец) (after Aleksei Grigorievich Stakhanov (Алексе́й Григо́рьевич Стаха́нов), a coal miner from Donbas noted for his superior productivity; the Soviet authorities publicized Stakhanov's prodigious output in 1935 as part of a campaign to increase industrial output).

- (historical) In the former Soviet Union, a worker who was exceptionally hardworking and productive and thus earned special privileges and rewards
- Any exceptionally hardworking or zealous person, often with connotations of excessive compliance with management and lack of solidarity with fellow workers

Stalinism (Russian: сталини́зм; the term Stalinism was first used in 1927, though not by Stalin himself, as he considered himself a Marxist–Leninist).

- (historical) The political, economic, and social principles and policies associated with Joseph Stalin during his rule (1924–1953) of the Soviet Union; especially the theory and practice of communism developed by Stalin, which included rigid authoritarianism, widespread use of terror, and often emphasis on Russian nationalism.
- Any rigid centralized authoritarian form of government or rule.

Stavka (Russian: Ста́вка) (historical) The general headquarters of armed forces in late Imperial Russia and in the former Soviet Union.

Streltsy singular strelitz, plural strelitzes or strelitzi (Russian: стрельцы́; singular: стреле́ц strelets, "bowman") (historical) Units of armed guards created by Ivan the Terrible in the 16th century and later abolished by Peter the Great.

Tovarishch also Tovarich (Russian: това́рищ IPA [tɐˈvarʲɪɕɕ], tovarishch, "close friend", referring to the noun това́р tovar, "merchandise"); In the former Soviet Union, a comrade; often used as a form of address.

Tsar also czar, tzar, csar, and zar (Russian: царь [t͡sarʲ], English /ˈzɑːr/: from Latin Caesar).

- (historical) Title of a Southern Slav ruler, as in Bulgaria (913–1018, 1185–1422, and 1908–1946) and Serbia (1346–1371).
- (historical) Title for the emperor of Russia from about 1547 to 1917, although the term after 1721 officially only referred to the Russian emperor's sovereignty over formerly independent states.
- (latter part of the 20th century) A person with great authority or power in a particular area, e.g., drug czar (spelled only as "czar" in this usage).

Tsarina also tsaritsa (formerly spelled czaritsa), czarina, German zarin, French tsarine (Russian: цари́ца) (Russian, etymology from tsar) (historical) The wife of a tsar; also the title for the empress of Russia.

Tsarevna also czarevna (Russian царе́вна, etymology from tsar).

- (historical) The daughter of a tsar
- The wife of a tsarevitch

Tsarevich also tsesarevich, czarevich, tzarevitch Russian: царе́вич, early 18th century, from tsar + patronymic -evich (historical) The eldest son of an emperor of Russia; the male heir to a tsar.

Tysyatsky also tysiatsky (Russian: ты́сяцкий) (sometimes translated as dux or Heerzog but more correctly meaning thousandman; sometimes translated into the Greek chilliarch, literally meaning "rule of a thousand") (historical) A military leader in Ancient Rus who commanded a people's volunteer army called tysyacha (Russian: ты́сяча), or a thousand.

Ukase (Russian: ука́з [ʊˈkas] ordinance, edict, from указывать, ukazat, to show) (pronunciation: /juːˈkeɪs/; yoo-KASE), a decree:

1. (historical) In Imperial Russia, a proclamation or edict of the ruling tsar or tsarina, the Russian government, or a religious leader (patriarch) that had the force of law
2. (historical) In the former Soviet Union, a government edict issued by the Presidium of the Supreme Soviet and subject to later ratification by the Supreme Soviet
3. In the Russian Federation, a presidential decree

Uskoreniye (Russian: ускоре́ние, literally "acceleration") A slogan and policy initiated in 1985 by Soviet leader Mikhail Gorbachev, aimed at the acceleration of social and economic development of the Soviet Union.

Votchina also otchina (Russian: во́тчина (о́тчина) "father's heritage") (historical)

1. An East Slavic land estate that could be inherited
2. The land owned by a knyaz

Yevsektsiya also Yevsektsia (Russian: ЕвСе́кция) (from the abbreviation of the phrase "Евре́йская се́кция" Yevreyskaya sektsiya) (historical) The Jewish section of the Soviet Communist party that was created in 1918 to challenge and eventually destroy the rival Bund and Zionist parties, suppress Judaism and "bourgeois nationalism", and replace traditional Jewish culture with "proletarian culture". It was disbanded in 1929.

Zampolit (Russian замполи́т, the abbreviation of (зам)еститель командира по (полит)ической части, "deputy commander (political)) A military or political commissar.

Zek (Russian abbreviation of ЗаКлючённый (З/К), zaklyuchennyi (Z/K), "incarcerated") (historical) In the former Soviet Union, a person held in a forced labour camp, known as Gulag, or in a prison.

Zemshchina (from Russian земля́ zemlya, "earth" or "land") (historical) The territory under the rule of the boyars who stayed in Moscow during the reign of Ivan the Terrible. It was separate from the rule of Ivan's own territory, which was administered by the Oprichnina.

Zemsky Sobor (Russian: зе́мский собо́р) (Russian assembly of the land) (historical) The first Russian parliament of the feudal estates type during the 16th and 17th centuries.

Zemstvo (Russian: зе́мство) (historical) A district and provincial assembly in Russia from 1864 to 1917.

== Religious ==
Beglopopovtsy also Beglopopovtsy (Russian: Беглопоповцы, "people with runaway priests") (historical) A denomination of the Old Believers that included priests who had deserted the Russian Orthodox Church during the Raskol.

Bespopovtsy also Bespopovtsy (Russian: Беспоповцы, "priestless") A denomination of the Old Believers that rejected the priests and a number of church rites, such as the Eucharist.

Chlysty also Khlysts, Khlysty (Russian: Хлысты) (invented Russian word Христоверы, transliteration Khristovery, "Christ-believers"; later critics corrupted the name, mixing it with the word хлыст khlyst, meaning "whip") (historical) A Christian sect in Russia that split from the Russian Orthodox Church in the 17th century and renounced the priesthood, holy books, and veneration of the saints. They were noted for their practice of asceticism, which included ecstatic rituals.

Doukhobor plural Doukhobors or Doukhabors (also Dukhobory or Dukhobortsy) (Russian: Духоборы/Духоборцы) (Russian doukhobor, literally "spirit wrestlers") A Christian sect, later defined as a religious philosophy, ethnic group, and social movement, which in the 18th century rejected secular government, the Russian Orthodox priests, icons, all church ritual, the Bible as the supreme source of divine revelation, and the divinity of Jesus. Widely persecuted by the Russian tsarist regimes, many of them immigrated to Canada in the late 19th century.

Edinoverie (Russian: Единоверие, "unity in faith") The practice of integrating Old Believer communities into the official Russian Orthodox Church while preserving their rites. Its adherents are Edinovertsy, "people of the same faith".

Imiaslavie also Imiabozhie, Imyaslavie, Imyabozhie; also referred to as Onomatodoxy (Russian: Имяславие, "glorification of the name (of God)"

Lipovans also known as Lippovans, or Russian Old Believers. A religious sect that separated from the Russian Orthodox Church in the 17th century, now mostly living in Romanian Dobruja.

Molokan (Russian: Молока́не, from Russian молоко (moloko), "milk"). A Christian sect that broke away from the Russian Orthodox Church in the mid-16th century and rejected many traditional Christian beliefs, including the veneration of religious icons, the Trinity, the worship in cathedrals, and the adherence to saintly holidays.

Pomortsy (Russian: Древлеправославная Поморская Церковь). Branch of the priestless faction of the Old Believers.

Popovtsy also The Popovtsy or Popovschina (Russian: Поповцы, Поповщина, "priestist people"). A branch of the Old Believers who strived to have priests of their own.

Prelest (Russian: Прелесть). Spiritual delusion, spiritual deception, or spiritual illusion.

Raskol also Raskolnik Russian: раско́л [rɐˈskol] (Russian, meaning "split" or "schism") The schism of the Russian Orthodox Church that was triggered by the 1653 reforms of Patriarch Nikon.

Rodnovery (Russian: Родноверие, "way of the people" or "way of the tribe"). A new religious movement from Russia and other Slavic countries that attempts to revive the pre-Christian beliefs of the ancient Slavs. Adherents of the Rodnovery religion, or anything related to Rodnovery, are known in English as Rodnover.

Rogozhskoe Soglasie (name from a Moscow cemetery called Rogozhskoe cemetery (Russian: Рогожское кладбище)). A denomination among the Popovtsy Old Believers.

Shaman (Russian: шама́н [ʂɐ'man], from the Evenki language). A tribal priest who enters an altered state of consciousness to commune with spirits.

Skoptzy plural Skopets, also Skoptsy, Skoptzi, Skoptsi, Scoptsy (Russian: скопцы, from Russian, meaning "castrated one") (historical). A Russian religious sect that practiced self-castration.

Starets (Russian: ста́рец old man, elder). A Russian religious spiritual leader, teacher, or counsellor.

Yurodivy (Russian: юродивый, jurodivyj). A form of Eastern Orthodox asceticism in which one intentionally acts foolish in the eyes of men; a Holy Fool.

Znamennoe singing, also Znamenny Chant (Russian: Знаменное пение or знаменный распев). The traditional liturgical singing in the Russian Orthodox Church.

== Technical, special ==
Chernozem (Russian: чернозём; from Russian черный, cherniy, "black" + Slavonic base зем, zem, "soil") A dark, humus-rich, fertile soil characteristic of temperate or cool grasslands, especially referring to the soil of the Russian steppes.

Baidarka (Russian: байда́рка, "small boat"; a diminutive form of baidar, "boat") A type of sea kayak originally made by the Aleut people of Alaska.

Elektrichka (Russian: электри́чка, informal word for elektropoezd Russian: электропо́езд, "electric train") An electric commuter.

Fortochka (Russian: фо́рточка) A small ventilation window spanning the frame of one window pane.

Kalashnikov Alternative name for the AK-47 assault rifle (AK-47, short for Russian: Автома́т Кала́шникова образца́ 1947 го́да, Avtomat Kalashnikova obraztsa 1947 goda Automatic Kalashnikov rifle, invented by Soviet soldier and small-arms designer Mikhail Kalashnikov and first adopted in 1947; the term "kalashnikov" was not used until 1970) A type of rifle or sub-machine gun from the Soviet Union, used in most Eastern Bloc countries during the Cold War.

Ledoyom, intermontane depressions filled with glaciers

Liman (Russian and Ukrainian: лима́н) (from Greek λιμένας, "bay" or "port") A type of lake or lagoon formed at the mouth of a river, blocked by a bar of sediments, especially referring to such features along the Danube River and the Black Sea.

Marshrutka (Russian: маршру́тка, [mɐrˈʂrutkə]; Russian, from marshrutnoye taxi, Russian Mаршрутное такси, literally "routed taxicab"). A share taxi used in the CIS and Bulgaria. In Ukraine and Russia, these are usually large vans (GAZelle, modified Ford Transit, or similar) or sometimes mini- or midibuses.

Mirovia (Russian: мирово́й) (from Russian mirovoy, "global", from mir, "world) A hypothesized paleo-ocean that may have been a global ocean surrounding the supercontinent of Rodinia in the Neoproterozoic era, about one billion to 750 million years ago.

Mormyshka also Mormishka, Marmooska (Russian: мормы́шка) (from Russian mormysh, "freshwater shrimp" (Gammaurus) A type of fishing lure or a jig.

Podsol also Podzol, Spodosol (Russian подзо́л, from под pod, "under" and зол zol, "ash") Any group of soils characterized by greyish-white leached and infertile topsoil and a brown subsoil, typically found in regions with a subpolar climate.

Polynia also polynya, polynia (Russian: полынья́; [pəlɨˈnʲja]) A non-linear area of open water surrounded by sea ice; especially referring to areas of sea in the Arctic and Antarctic regions that remain unfrozen for much of the year.

Redan (French word for "projection", "salient", after Russian Реда́н redan, a type of fort that was captured by the British during the Crimean War) A type of fortification work in a V-shaped salient angle toward an expected attack.

Rodinia (from the Russian ро́дина, "motherland") Name given to hypothesized supercontinent said to have existed from one billion to 800 million years ago.

Rasputitsa (Russian: распу́тица) The twice-annual season when roads become muddy and impassable in Belarus, Russia, and Ukraine due to the melting snows in the spring and heavy rains in the fall.

Solonchak (Russian солонча́к, "salt marsh", from Russian соль, sol, "salt") A pale or grey soil type found in arid to sub-humid, poorly drained conditions.

Solonetz (from Russian солоне́ц, solonets, "salt not produced by boiling", from Russian соль, sol, "salt") An alkaline soil type having a hard, dark subsoil under a thin, friable topsoil, formed by the leaching of salts from a solonchak.

Tokamak (Russian: токама́к, an abbreviation of the Russian words тороидальная камера в магнитных катушках, toroidal'naya kamera v magnitnykh katushkakh, toroidal chamber in magnetic coils (Tochamac), invented in the 1950s) In nuclear fusion, a toroidal apparatus in which plasma is contained by means of two magnetic fields, a strong toroidal field, and a weaker poloidal field generated by an intense electric current through the plasma.

Zastruga (zastrugi; Russian sing. застру́га, zastruga, pl. застру́ги, zastrugi; from стругать, "to whittle") Sharp, irregular grooves or ridges formed on a snow surface by wind erosion, saltation of snow particles, and deposition, and found in polar and temperate snow regions.

Obsolete Russian weights and measures:

- Pood also pud (Russian: пуд) (largely obsolete) A unit of mass in Russia, Belarus, and Ukraine equal to 40 funt (фунт, Russian pound), or approximately 16.38 kilograms (36.11 pounds). It is still used in metal weights, produced for heavy lifting sports (items by 16, 24, 32 kg).
- Verst (Russian: верста́, versta) An obsolete Russian unit of length or distance defined as being 500 sazhen long, equivalent to 3,500 feet (.66 miles/1.0668 kilometres).

Vigorish (Russian: выигрыш, vyigrysh, "winnings") The amount charged by a bookmaker for taking a bet from a gambler.

== Animals and plants ==
Beluga (sturgeon) (from Russian белу́га, beluga, a derivative from белый, white) A large kind of sturgeon.

Beluga (whale) (from Russian белу́ха belukha, a derivative of белый, white) A type of white whale.

Corsac (from Russian корса́к, korsák, the name for the species) A type of fox.

Khramulya (Russian: храму́ля) The name of several fish species of the family Cyprinidae: Anatolian Khramulya, Colchic Khramulya, and Sevan khramulya.

Lenok (Russian: лено́к; otherwise known as Asiatic trout or Manchurian trout) A genus, Brachymystax, of salmonid fishes.

Saiga (from Russian сайга́, the name for the species) A type of antelope.

Sheltopusik (also Scheltopusik; Russian: желтопу́зик, literally "yellow-bellied") European legless lizard (Pseudopus apodus).

== Various ==
Banya (Russian: ба́ня) A traditional Russian steam bath.

Bayan (Russian: бая́н) (named after Boyan, a mythical Slavic bard) A type of chromatic button accordion developed in Russia in the early 20th century.

Belomorkanal (Russian: Беломоркана́л)

1. White Sea – Baltic Canal (Belomorsko-Baltiyskiy Kanal, abbreviated as BBK; its original name was Беломо́рско-Балти́йский кана́л и́мени Ста́лина Belomorsko-Baltiyskiy Kanal imeni Stalina, "Stalin White Sea-Baltic Sea Canal", "Stalin" was dropped in 1961 and the name was abbreviated to Belomorkanal). A shipping canal (opened in 1933) that joins the White Sea with Lake Onega, which is further connected to the Baltic Sea.
2. Belomorkanal, a brand of cheap Soviet cigarettes.

Burlak (Russian: бурла́к) (Tatar bujdak, "homeless"; or old Middle-German bûrlach, originating from an artel [арте́ль] or working team with fixed rules) A Russian epithet for a person who hauled barges and other vessels down dry or shallow waterways from the 17th to the 20th century.

Bylina (Russian: были́на, "[tale of] a past event"; plural: были́ны byliny) (Adaptation of Old Russian bylina, a word that occurred in The Song of Igor's Campaign, taken to mean "tale of a past event"; the term "bylina" came into use in the 1830s as a scholarly name for what is popularly called "starina"; although byliny originated in the 10th century, or possibly earlier, they were first written down around the 17th century) A traditional form of orally transmitted Russian epic and heroic narrative poetry of the early East Slavs of Kievan Rus from the 10th to 12th century, a tradition that continued in Russian and Ukrainian history.

Cantonists singular Cantonist (Russian: кантони́сты; the term adapted from Prussian for "recruiting district") (historical) Boys, often sons of military conscripts, who attended a type of military school called a canton (Russian: кантони́стские шко́лы), a school that was originally established by Peter the Great; in the 1820s, the term was applied to Jewish boys drafted into the Russian army.

Chainik (Russian: ча́йник, "tea kettle")

Chastushka (Russian: часту́шка, derives from "часто" – "frequently", or from части́ть – old word that means "to do something with high frequency", probably referring to the high tempo of chastushkas). A traditional type of short Russian humorous folkloric song with high beat frequency that consists of one four-lined couplet full of humour, satire, or irony. Chastushkas are typically sung one after another.

Dacha (Russian: да́ча) A country house or cottage in Russia. In archaic Russian, the word dacha means "something given". Initially, they were small estates in the country, given to loyal vassals by the tsar. Typical Soviet dachas were small land plots given by the state to city dwellers, who built summer houses on them.

Dedovshchina (Russian: дедовщи́на) (from Russian ded, "grandfather", Russian army slang equivalent of "gramps", meaning soldiers in their third or fourth half-year of conscription, + suffix -shchina – order, rule, or regime; hence "rule of the grandfathers") A system of hazing in the Soviet and Russian armies.

GUM (Russian: ГУМ, pronounced as goom, in full Главный Универсальный Магазин, Glavnyi Universalnyi Magazin acronym for Main Universal Store) A common name for the main department store in many cities of the former Soviet Union and some post-Soviet states; especially referring to the GUM facing Red Square in Moscow.

Izba also Isba (origin 1775–85, Russian изба́, izbá; Old Russian istŭba, house, bath; Serbo-Croatian ìzba, small room, shack; Czech jizba, room; Old Czech jistba, jizdba, all from Slavic *jĭstŭba ≪ VL *extūfa, with short u, perhaps from Germanic *stuba) A traditional log house in rural Russia, with an unheated entrance room and a single living and sleeping room heated by a clay or brick stove.

Junker (Russia) (Russian: ю́нкер) (from Middle High German junc herre, "young nobleman", from Old High German jung, "young" + herro, "lord") (historical)

- A member of the privileged, militaristic landowning class in Germany; a Prussian aristocrat
- A German military officer, especially one who is autocratic
- (1864–1917) A student who attended a type of Russian military school called a Junker school
- Former rank of a volunteer in the Russian Navy in the 19th and 20th centuries

Katorga (Russian: ка́торга, from Greek: katergon, κάτεργον, "galley") (historical) A form of penal servitude during Tsarist Russia, later transformed into the Gulags after the Bolshevik takeover of Russia.

Khodebshchik (Russian: ходе́бщик) A person carrying an advertisement hoarding, or a peddler.

Mat (Russian: мат, or ма́терный язы́к) Russian profanity meaning "mother".

Muzhik (Russian: мужи́к) A Russian peasant; used as a topical calque in translations of Russian prose.

Padonki (Russian: падонки, corrupted подо́нки, meaning "riff-raff", "scoundrel", "scum") A subculture within the Russian-speaking internet characterized by choosing alternative spellings for words for comic effect.

Palochka (Russian: па́лочка, "little stick") A typographical symbol of the Cyrillic alphabet that looks like the Latin uppercase letter "I"; it is used as modifier letter in some Caucasus languages.

Preved (Russian: Преве́д) A Russian internet slang word, corrupted form of "privet" (приве́т) – "hi", "greetings".

Sambo (Russian: са́мбо) (Russian acronym for САМозащи́та Без Ору́жия, SAMozashchita Bez Oruzhiya, "self-defense without a weapon") A modern martial art, combat sport, and self-defense system originally developed in the former Soviet Union.

Samizdat (Russian: самизда́т) (Russian сам, sam, "self"; and издат, izdat, short for izdatelstvo – "publishing house", hence "self published") (historical) In the former Soviet Union, the system by which government-suppressed literature was clandestinely written, printed, and distributed; the term is also applied to the literature itself.

Sbiten (Russian: сби́тен) (historical) A traditional East Slavic hot winter beverage.

Sbitenshchik (Russian: сби́тенщик) (historical) A vendor who sold sbiten.

Sharashka also Sharaga, Sharazhka (Russian: шара́шка IPA: [ʂɐˈraʂkə]) (Russian slang for the expression sharashkina kontora, "Sharashka's office", possibly from the radical meaning "to beat about", an ironic, derogatory term to denote a poorly organized, impromptu, or bluffing organization) (historical) Informal name for the secret research and development laboratories in the Soviet Union's Gulag labor camp system.

Tamizdat (from Russian тамизда́т: там, tam, meaning "there" and издат, izdat, short for изда́тельство, izdatelstvo, "publishing house") In the former Soviet Union, literary works published outside the country without permission of Soviet authorities.

Zaum (Russian: за́умь or зау́мный язы́к, zaumnyy yazyk) (from the Russian prefix за, "beyond, behind" and the noun ум, "mind") A type of poetry used by Russian Futurist poets.

== See also ==
- Lists of English words of international origin
- List of English words of Ukrainian origin, many of which also appear in Russian or are closely related
- Cyrillic script
- Runglish
- Nadsat, a constructed argot with many Russian loanwords
