= Vailokaitis =

- Lithuanian surname
- m.: Vailokaitis
- f.: (unmarried): Vailokaitytė
- f.: (married): Vailokaitienė

Vailokaitis is a Lithuanian surname of uncertain origin, possibly from Slavicism vailokas ("felt"; from Russian: войлок) + patronymic suffix -aitis.

- Aleksandra Vailokaitienė (1895 – 1957), Lithuanian photographer
- Jonas Vailokaitis (1886 – 1944), Lithuanian banker and industrialist
- Juozas Vailokaitis (1880–1955), Lithuanian political and public figure, Roman Catholic priest, publisher, businessman, banker
