= Solyanka =

Thick and sour soup of Russian origin

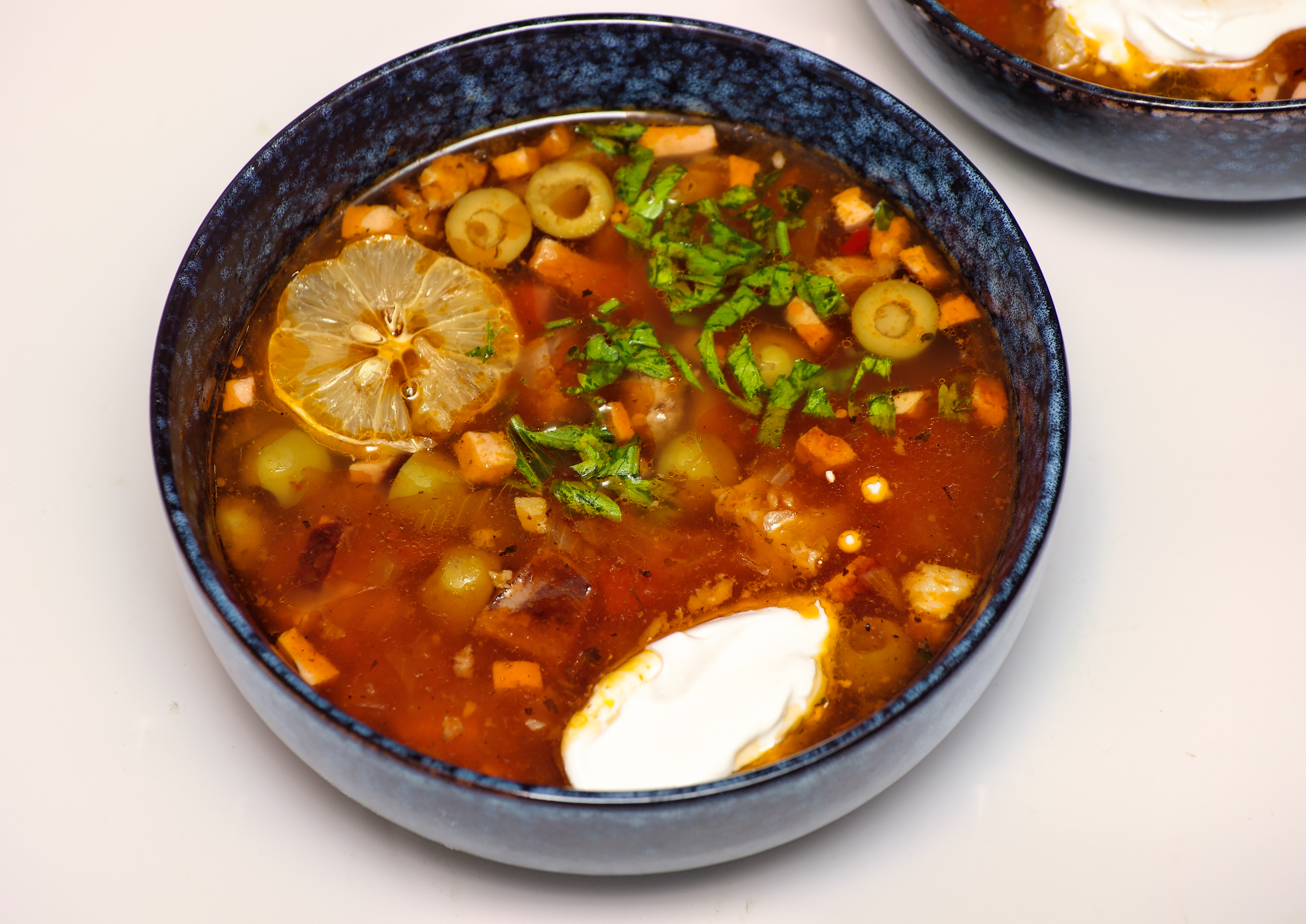
- Solyanka
- Alternative names: Selyanka
- Type: Soup
- Place of origin: Russia
- Associated cuisine: Russian, Ukrainian, Latvian, Georgian, East German
- Serving temperature: Hot
- Main ingredients: Meat, fish, or mushrooms, pickled cucumbers, cabbage, onions, often potatoes, smetana, dill

Solyanka (Russian: соля́нка; initially selyanka; Russian: селя́нка, [sɐˈlʲankə]) is a thick and sour soup of Russian origin. It is a common dish in Russia, Ukraine, Belarus, the Baltic states, and other post-Soviet states and other parts of the former Eastern Bloc. It was one of the most reliably available dishes in East Germany (German: Soljanka).

== Name ==
The original name selyanka can be translated as "settler's soup" in English. There are many theories about the origin of the name, but a common one is that the soup was often eaten after the wedding before the newlyweds "settled down" and started their new life together. Other translations include "food of the villager" or "villager's stew". Later, the name was transformed to solyanka, using the word sol (salt) as a reference to the soup's saltiness.

Due to its astringent sour taste that is believed to relieve a hangover, solyanka has also earned the nickname "hangover soup."

== History ==
The first written mention of solyanka or selyanka dates back to the 17th century, where it is described as a hot dish with cabbage, salted cucumbers, meat, poultry, fish, mushrooms or other products. One of the first recipes of selyanka in Russian culinary literature comes from Nikolai Osipov's book Ancient Russian Housewives, Housekeepers and Troublemakers (1794). In the Dictionary of the Russian Academy (1822), solyanka is still described as a main course, rather than a soup.

A soup version of solyanka emerged in the 1830s. It was mentioned by Russian chef Gerasim Stepanov in 1834 under the section on "Miscellaneous Shti" (shchi), alongside nettle soups and Ukrainian borscht. Since the 1840s, solyanka soup has been increasingly mentioned as a separate dish. Yekaterina Avdeyeva's 1842 book The Handbook of an Experienced Russian Hostess (1842) gives a version of solyanka soup made with mushrooms. In the second half of the 19th century, solyanka received the modern form of its name.

== Variations ==
There are three basic types of solyanka, with the main ingredient being either meat, fish, or mushrooms. Meat solyanka is the most popular. All three types of solyanka contain pickled mushrooms or cucumbers, cabbage, smetana and dill.

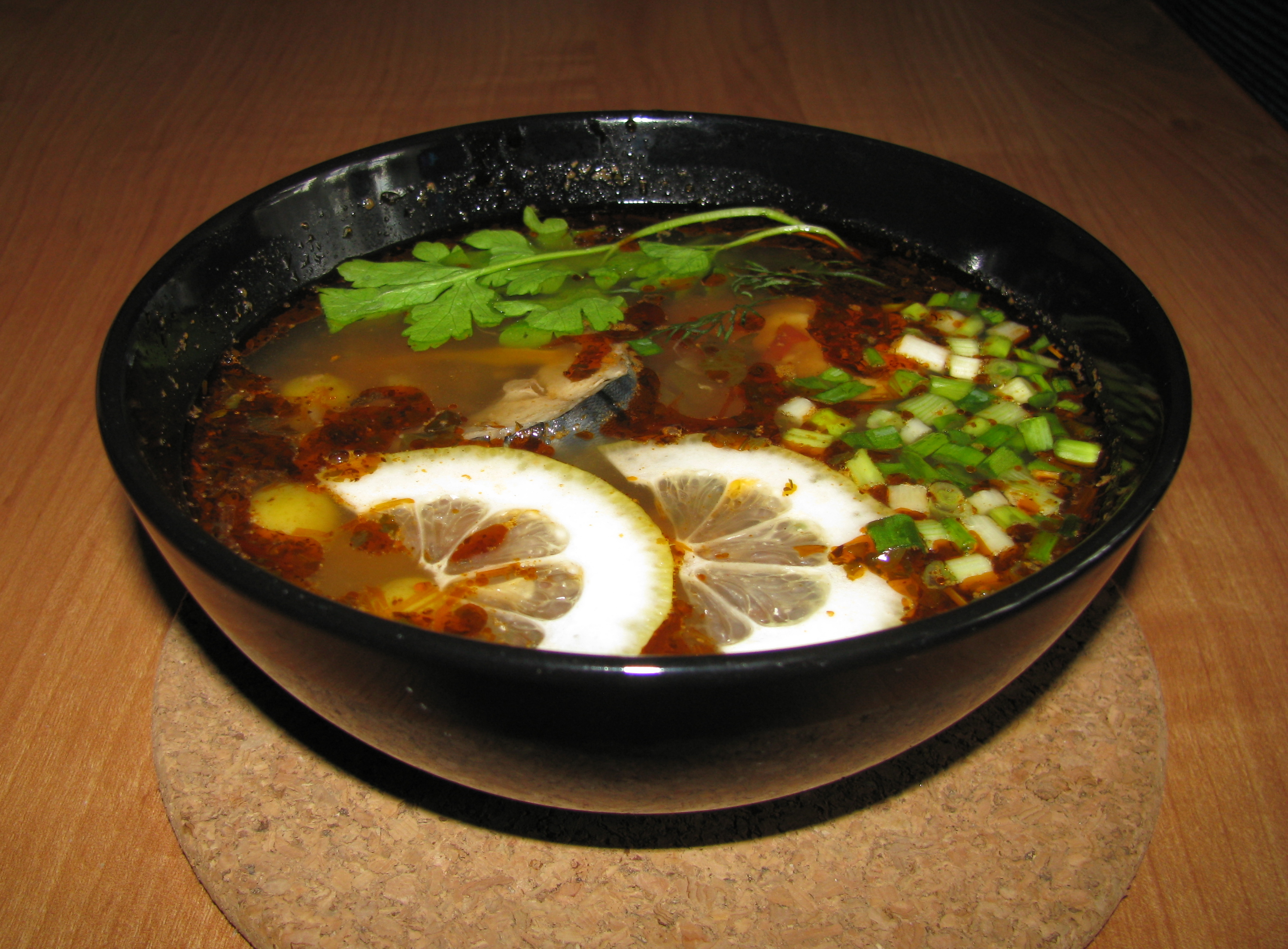
Fish solyanka

- For meat solyanka, ingredients like beef, veal, ham, sausages, liver, chicken breast together with pickled mushrooms or cucumbers, onions, potatoes, tomato paste, pitted olives, allspice, cardamom, bay leaf, parsley, and fresh dill are all cut fine and mixed in a pot of broth.
- Fish solyanka is prepared similarly, but salt-cured and smoked fish, such as salmon or trout, is used instead of meat.
- For mushroom solyanka, cut cabbage is heated in butter together with vinegar, tomatoes, cucumber pickles, and a little brine. Separately, mushrooms and onions are heated, and grated lemon zest is added. Cabbage and mushrooms are added in layers, breadcrumbs and butter are added, and the soup is briefly baked.

Non-soup variants of solyanka also exist

== Distribution ==
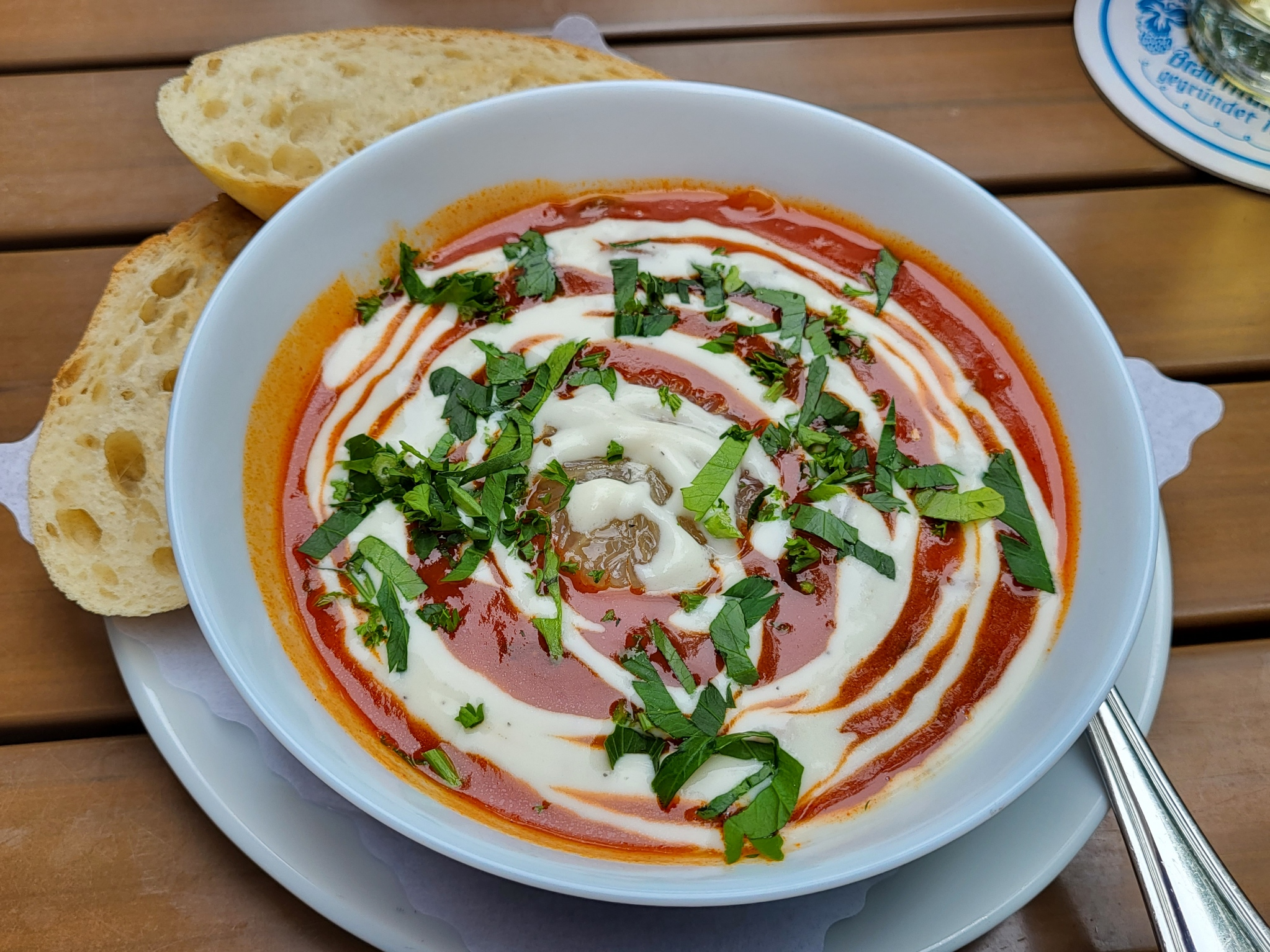
Solyanka with sour cream, lemon and baguette at the Waldhaus Köhlerhütte in Waltershausen

Solyanka was also popular in East Germany and the Soviet occupation zone, which includes the current German states of Brandenburg, Mecklenburg-Vorpommern, Saxony, Saxony-Anhalt, and Thuringia, along with the eastern half of Berlin. It is still commonly found in restaurants and available in canned form in grocery stores. The German transliteration is Soljanka. This practice stems from the era when the Soviet Army was stationed in East Germany, and Soljanka was found on the menu at many East German restaurants. The former German chancellor Angela Merkel, who was raised in East Germany, has stated that she is fond of solyanka.

== See also ==
- Borshch
- Rassolnik
- Shchi
- List of Russian dishes
- List of soups
