= Nettle soup =

Soup dish made with stinging nettles

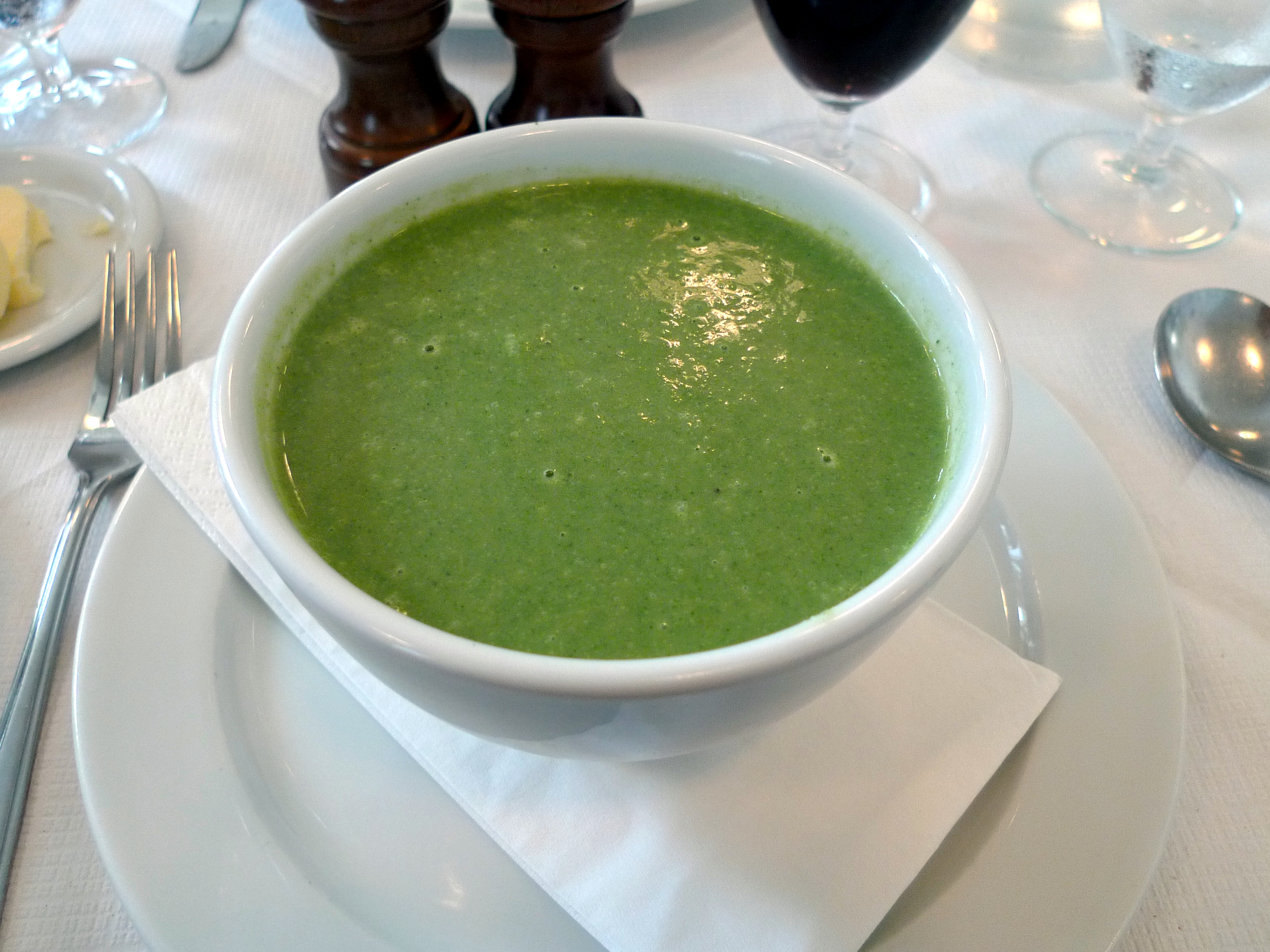
- Nettle soup served at a restaurant in London
- Type: Soup
- Region or state: Northern Europe, Eastern Europe, Middle East
- Main ingredients: Stinging nettles

Nettle soup is a soup prepared from stinging nettles. Nettle soup is eaten mainly during spring and early summer, when young nettle buds are collected. Today, nettle soup is mostly eaten in Scandinavia, Finland, Iran, Ireland, the United Kingdom, and Eastern Europe, with regional differences in recipe; however historically consumption of nettles was more widespread.

== History ==
Nettle stew was eaten by inhabitants of Britain and Ireland in the Bronze Age, 3000 years ago. The consumption of young stinging nettle in medieval Europe was used medicinally, primarily as a diuretic and to treat joint pain and arthritis, diabetes, acne, anemia, hay fever, and as a blood purifier. Various Native American tribes have used stinging nettles for centuries, including the Lakota using the root for stomach pain, the Ojibwa using the stewed leaves for skin issues and used it to fight dysentery, the Potawatomi using the roots for fever reduction, and the Winnebago used nettles for allergy symptoms.

Stinging nettles are known to have a high nutritional value, including calcium, magnesium, iron, and vitamins A and B. Historically, one of the easy ways of consuming nettles is either through a soup or a tea because the boiling water deactivates the nettle from stinging.

== Regional variations ==
There are regional and cultural differences for recipes for Nettle soup.

=== Fennoscandia ===
==== Finland ====
One of the local traditional dishes is a nettle and fish soup in the Finnish medieval town of Porvoo.

==== Sweden ====
A typical Swedish recipe for nettle soup (nässelsoppa) involves first blanching the nettles, and then straining them from the liquid. The liquid is then strained again to remove the dirt (pieces of sand or gravel) from it. Then a roux is made, with butter and flour, onto which the "nettle water" (the water in which the nettles were blanched) is poured. The nettles are chopped very finely, or puréed, together with the other ingredients, which typically include chives (or ramson or garlic), and chervil or fennel. The chopped or puréed nettles and herbs are then put into the nettle water, brought to a boil, and then left to simmer for a few minutes. The soup is commonly served with sliced boiled eggs or crème fraîche, and occasionally with poached eggs.

=== Native American ===
A Native American stinging nettle and squash soup recipe, provided by the Northwest Indian College, consists of stinging nettles, acorn squash, broth, garlic, onion and oil. The squash is cut, de-seeded and roasted. In a separate pot, the onions and garlic are sautéed until translucent, and then the squash and nettles (which can be cooked or fresh nettles) are added. Together they all cook in the pot for 20 minutes, then finished in a blender.

=== Iran ===
There is a nettle soup recipe from the Mazandaran province of Iran. There are variations on the ingredients for this soup recipe, however all of the recipes include stinging nettles, garlic, onion, chickpeas, turmeric, rice, lentils, greens, oil and either pomegranate paste or pomegranate molasses. Optional ingredients can include other types of beans (pinto beans, fava beans), beets, butternut squash, other types of greens (local northern Iranian herbs zolang and anarijeh, spinach, Persian leek, cilantro), The water that the nettles are cooked in (for preparation of the soup) is saved and used as a drinking tea, for medicinal purposes.

=== Ireland ===
Irish nettle soup recipe includes nettles, potatoes, cream, leeks, onions, butter, and broth. Typically nettle soup in traditional Irish culture is consumed in late Spring (April and May) and is associated with purifying blood, reducing rashes, "keeps the rheumatics away", and adds vitamins to the diet.

=== Pontic Greeks ===
The Pontic Greeks, who originate in the Pontus region of modern-day Turkey, make nettle soup with leeks, onions, bulgur, garlic, and black pepper. In the Pontic Greek language, this soup is called kinteata.

=== Eastern Europe ===
==== Ukraine ====
Ukrainian nettle soup (green borsht) recipes include onion, carrots, potatoes, dill, and nettle; cabbage is often added to increase nourishment. It may either be vegetarian or cooked with meat broth and Ukrainian nettle soup is served with a sliced boiled egg and a spoon of smetana (dairy product). It is usually cooked with fresh nettle in the late spring. The Ukrainian nettle soup is a variation of Sorrel soup.

==== Russia ====
The traditional Russian Shchi in the spring is prepared with the first spring greens, including sorrel, orache and nettle. Such Shchi is called "green".

=== Himalaya ===
In southern Bhutan Sisnu dal is consumed in the spring. It is made of nettle combined with Musuri Dal. It can include garlic, chilli, potato also.

== See also ==
- List of soups
