= Vera Lysenko =

Writer

Vera Lesik (1910-1975) was a Canadian writer on the loss of Ukrainian heritage.

Born in Winnipeg to Ukrainian Baptist parents, she graduated B.A. from University of Manitoba in 1929.

Written under the pseudonym Vera Lysenko, her Men in Sheepskin Coats; a Study In Assimilation (1947) was a controversial study of the gradual loss of the native Ukrainian heritage, a theme continued in her novel Yellow Boots (1954).

== See also ==
=== Archives ===
There is a Vera Lysenko fonds at Library and Archives Canada. The archival reference number is R5614.
