= Canadian Ukrainian =

Dialect of Ukrainian

- канадський діалект української мови
- Native to: Canada
- Region: Mostly the Prairie Provinces, especially in the historical Ukrainian Bloc Settlement
- Language family: Indo-European: Balto-Slavic; Slavic; East Slavic; Ukrainian; Canadian Ukrainian

Language codes
- ISO 639-3: –
- Glottolog: None
- IETF: uk-CA

Canadian Ukrainian (Ukrainian: канадський діалект української мови, romanized: kanadskyi dialekt ukrainskoi movy, IPA: [kɐˈnɑdzʲsʲkɪj d⁽ʲ⁾iɐˈlɛkt ʊkrɐˈjinʲsʲkoji ˈmɔwɪ], lit. 'Canadian dialect of Ukrainian') is a dialect of the Ukrainian language specific to the Ukrainian Canadian community descended from the first three waves of historical Ukrainian emigration to Western Canada. Canadian Ukrainian was widely spoken from the beginning of Ukrainian settlement in Canada in 1892 until the mid-20th century, when the number of its speakers started gradually declining.

== Vocabulary ==
The vocabulary of the dialect, circa the 1920s, consisted of mostly of common Ukrainian words, dialecticisms from Western Ukraine, and Ukrainianizations of English words. For example, concepts that were well known from the pre-emigration period continued to be called by their Ukrainian names, as in kukhnia (kitchen), and oliia (oil). Some of these were already regionally distinct to Western Ukraine, for example the word for coal vuhlia instead of what became the standard in Ukrainian, vuhillia. However, for new concepts that had not existed in rural Austria-Hungary in the late 19th and early twentieth century, English words were simply adapted into Ukrainian speech, as in трак trak "truck", пампс pamps "pumps", кеш реґистер kesh regyster "cash register", or рісіт risit "receipt".

== History of the Ukrainian language in Canada ==
Prior to the First World War, Canadian authorities in many areas did allow some Ukrainian-language instruction in public schools, as minority language rights had been given a degree of protection early in the history of the West, during the Manitoba Schools Question. However, during the war era nativist attitudes came to the fore and all minority language rights were revoked. Speaking Ukrainian in school was expressly forbidden for most of the mid-20th Century. Ukrainian would not again be spoken in Western Canadian public schools until policy of multiculturalism became official in the very late 1960s.

Economically, Ukrainian speakers in Canada tended to lag behind others because of the need for English in most fields of labour. Ukrainians also faced ridicule and intimidation from some in the majority community for not speaking English only, particularly if they moved outside the majority ethnic-Ukrainian rural Bloc Settlements. Those migrating to other rural areas or from the countryside to nearby cities such as Edmonton and Winnipeg were often quicker to lose their language. Ukrainian language use became associated with rural backwardness and went into relative decline, and would only increase with the introduction of a new wave of post-World War II immigrant speakers who spoke, by and large, a Modern or Standard Ukrainian, and not Canadian Ukrainian.

== Examples ==
=== Poem ===
This version of the Red Ensign appears in the 1925 Bukvar.

This poem about the Canadian Red Ensign comes from a bukvar ("basal reader") published in Winnipeg in 1925. The Canadian Red Ensign was the unofficial flag of Canada at the time. Differences in the canadian dialect are bolded.

Canadian Ukrainian

Наш прапор.

Наш прапор має три кольори: червоний, білий і **синий**.

Червоний означає: "Будь відважний"
Білий означає: "Будь чесний"
**Синий** означає: "Будь вірний"

Пам'ятаймо **о тім**, коли дивимось на Наш прапор.

Standard Ukrainian

Наш прапор.

Наш прапор має три кольори: червоний, білий і **синій**.

Червоний означає: «Будь відважний»
Білий означає: «Будь чесний»
**Синій** означає: «Будь вірний»

Пам'ятаймо **про це**, коли дивимось на Наш прапор.

Translation in English

Our Flag

Our flag has three colours: Red, white and blue.

Red stands for: "Be Brave"
White stands for: "Be Honest"
Blue stands for: "Be Faithful"

This we remember, when we see our flag.

=== Vocabulary ===
Canadian Ukrainian	Standard Ukrainian	English
Авто (avto)	Машина (mashyna), авто (avto), автівка (avtivka)	Car
Гаммер (hammer)	Молоток (molotok)	Hammer
Бpyква (brukva)	Ріпа (ripa)	Turnip
Бараболя (barabolia)	Картопля (kartoplia)	Potato
Денсувати (densuvaty)	Танцювати (tantsiuvaty)	To dance

== See also ==
- List of Canadian toponyms of Ukrainian origin
- List of English words of Ukrainian origin
