= Polonism =

Polish loanwords

Polonisms are loanwords from Polish into other languages.

Polonisms are the second largest group of loanwords in Ukrainian. Polish also served as a mediator of borrowings from German into Ukrainian (for example, 'to cost': Ukrainian: 'koshtuvaty', from Polish: 'kosztować', from German 'kosten')

In Lithuanian language, Polonisms are much more recent stratum than borrowings from East Slavic (Ruthenisms), as Lithuanians made close contact with East Slavs than with Poles.

== See also ==
- List of English words of Polish origin
- Wiktionary:Category:Terms derived from Polish by language
