= Rassolnik =

Russian soup

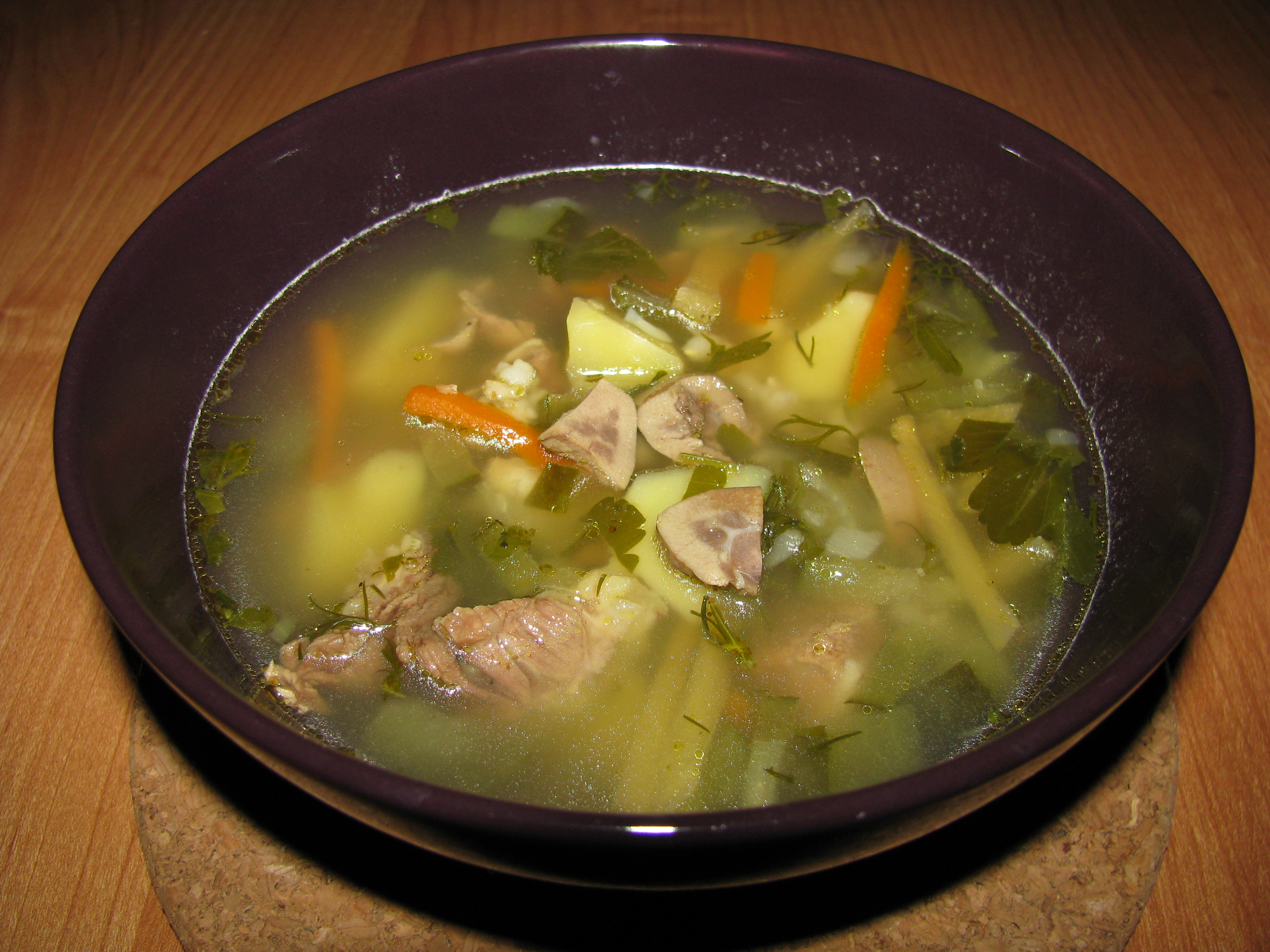
- Type: Soup
- Place of origin: Russia
- Serving temperature: Hot
- Main ingredients: Pickled cucumbers, pearl barley, pork or beef kidneys
- Variations: Vegetarian rassolnik, Leningrad rassolnik, Moscow rassolnik
- Similar dishes: Solyanka, shchi, schavel borscht

Rassolnik (Russian: рассольник [rɐˈs(ː)olʲnʲɪk]) is a traditional Russian soup made from pickled cucumbers, pearl barley, and pork or beef kidneys. A vegetarian variant of rassolnik also exists, usually made during Lent. The dish is known to have existed as far back as the 15th century, when it was called kalya. Rassolnik became part of the common Soviet cuisine and today it is also popular in Ukraine (as rozsoljnyk) and Belarus (as rasoljnik). A similar dish is common in Poland, where it is known as zupa ogórkowa (literally 'cucumber soup').

The key part of rassolnik is the rassol, a liquid based on the juice of pickled cucumbers with various other seasonings. It is a favourite hangover remedy.

== Etymology ==
The word rassolnik originates from the Russian word рассольник (English: [rɐˈs(ː)olʲnʲɪk]), consisting of рассол (rassol,” brine”) + - ник (-nik). The word refers to a Russian soup made of pickled cucumbers.

== Ingredients ==
The ingredients for rassolnik consist of meat (either chicken meat, or pork or beef kidneys), potatoes, pearled barley, carrot, onion, pickles, dill, and smetana, a sour cream.

== History ==
Rassolnik is considered one of the traditional dishes in Russian cuisine, though it has been mentioned in Russian culinary books starting from the 18th century. The origins of rassolnik lie in other soups that consist of fermented ingredients, such as kalya, made with chicken or fish meat, roe, pickled cucumbers, or pickled lemons and lemon brine. Rassol, or brine, has been widely used in traditional Russian cuisine. Kalya is mentioned in Writings of Royal Cuisine (Russian: Росписи царским кушаньям), which describes the ingredients of kalya as, “For a Kalya with a lemon brine, and chicken, add a single lemon. For a Kalya with a cucumber brine, and chicken, add 10 cucumbers”.

Other mentions of rassol in traditional Russian cuisine can be found in Notes on Muscovite Affairs (Russian: Записках о Московии) by Sigismund von Herberstein, a Carniolan diplomat in the 16th century. The writing states, “When they were eating roasted swans, they garnered it with brine, alongside the salt and pepper. Moreover, a sour milk has also been served”.

Aside from kalya and solyanka, both made with pickled cucumber brine, other spicy and sour soups were also created for use as hangover treatments during the Kievan Rus’ period.

The exact time period of when rassolnik in its current state became widespread is unknown. The soup is mentioned in many culinary books from the 19th century, though the first mentions of rassolnik originate from the middle of the 18th century.

Originally rassolnik, based on the Vladimir Dal works, was described as a meat pie with a filling of pickled cucumber. Rassolnik is also mentioned in Nikolai Gogol’s work Dead Souls, noting that "Rassolnik is a pie with chicken and buckwheat, with pickle-juice poured into the filling."

Other mentions of rassolnik before it was referred to as a type of soup or pirog can be found in the Brockhaus and Efron Encyclopedic Dictionary, which describes rassolnik as a type of platters or bowls that have been used to serve the dish.

During the Soviet period, Leningrad rassolnik, consisting of beef kidneys, became widely popular. The inventor of this soup variation is Nikolai Alexandrovich Kurbatov, who invented multiple dishes during the Soviet period. Leningrad rassolnik is cooked in chicken broth, with beef kidneys added, and the new additions to the recipe were potatoes and carrots, and pearl barley replaced with rice.

== See also ==
- Borshch
- Shchi
- List of Russian dishes
- List of soups
