= Shchi =

Russian-style cabbage soup

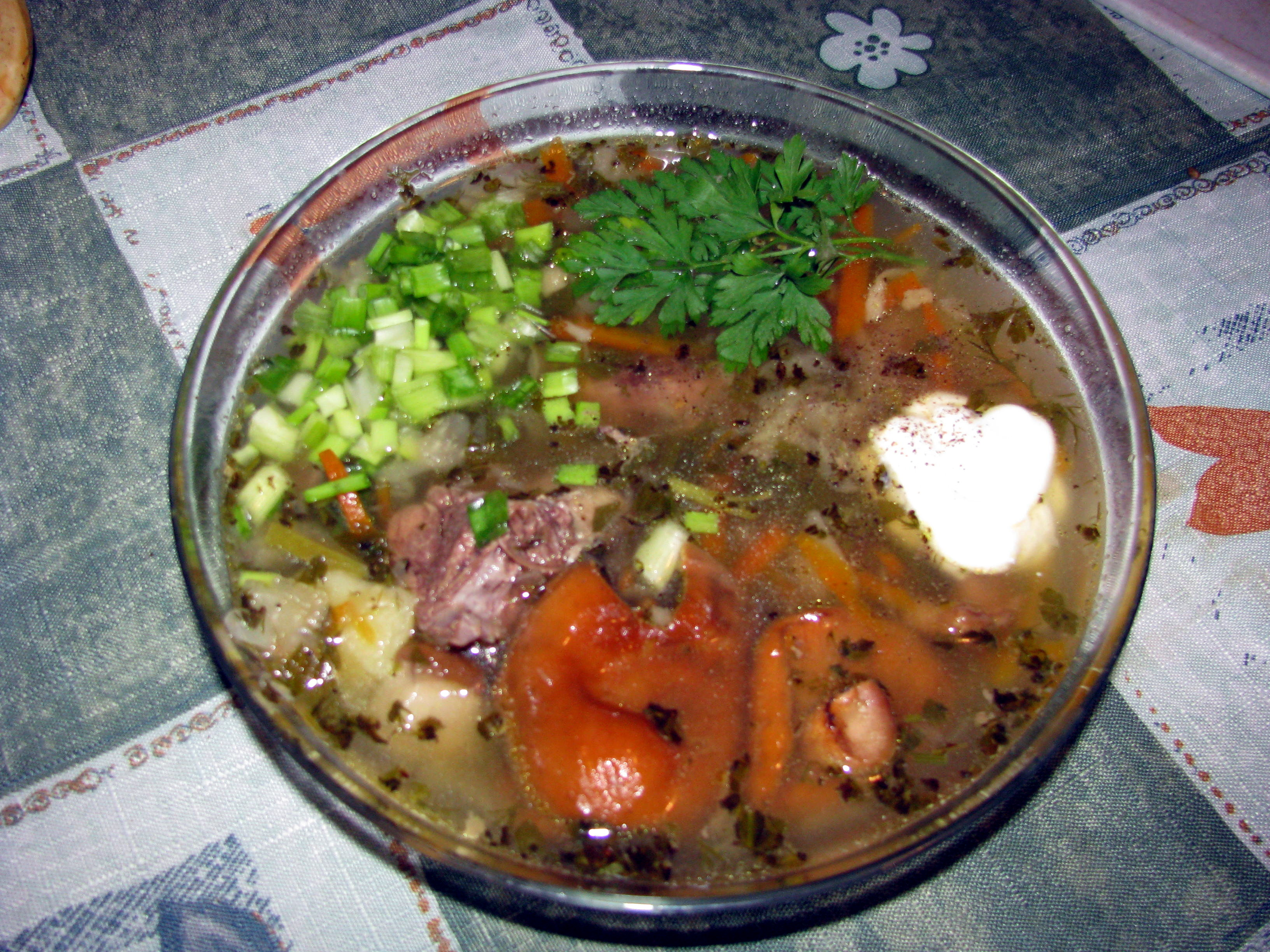
- A serving of shchi. This variant contains saffron milk-caps, a type of mushroom.
- Type: Soup
- Place of origin: Russia
- Main ingredients: Cabbage or sauerkraut
- Ingredients generally used: Potatoes, onions, garlic, carrot, parsley

Shchi (Russian: щи, IPA: [ɕːi], sometimes transliterated as šči) is a Russian-style cabbage soup. When sauerkraut is used instead, the soup is called sour shchi, while soups based on sorrel, spinach, nettle, and similar plants are called green shchi (Russian: зелёные щи, IPA: [zʲɪˈlʲɵnɨje ɕːi]). In the past, the term sour shchi was also used to refer to a drink, a variation of kvass, which was unrelated to the soup.

== History ==
Shchi (from Old East Slavic: съти, the plural of "съто" (s(i)to) – "something satisfying, feed") is a traditional soup of Russia. Cabbage soups have been known in Kievan Rus as far back as the 9th century, soon after cabbage was introduced from Byzantium. Its popularity in Russia originates from several factors:

- Shchi is relatively easy to prepare;
- it can be cooked with or without various types of meat;
- and it can be frozen in the winter and carried as a solid on a trip to be cut up when needed.

As a result, by the 10th century shchi became a staple food of Russia, and a popular saying sprang from this fact: "Щи да каша — пища наша." (Shchi da kasha — pishcha nasha "Shchi and kasha are our food").

=== Historical ingredients ===
The major components of shchi were originally cabbage, meat (beef, pork, lamb, or poultry), mushrooms, flour, and spices (based on onion and garlic). Cabbage and meat were cooked separately and smetana was added as a garnish before serving. Shchi is traditionally eaten with rye bread.

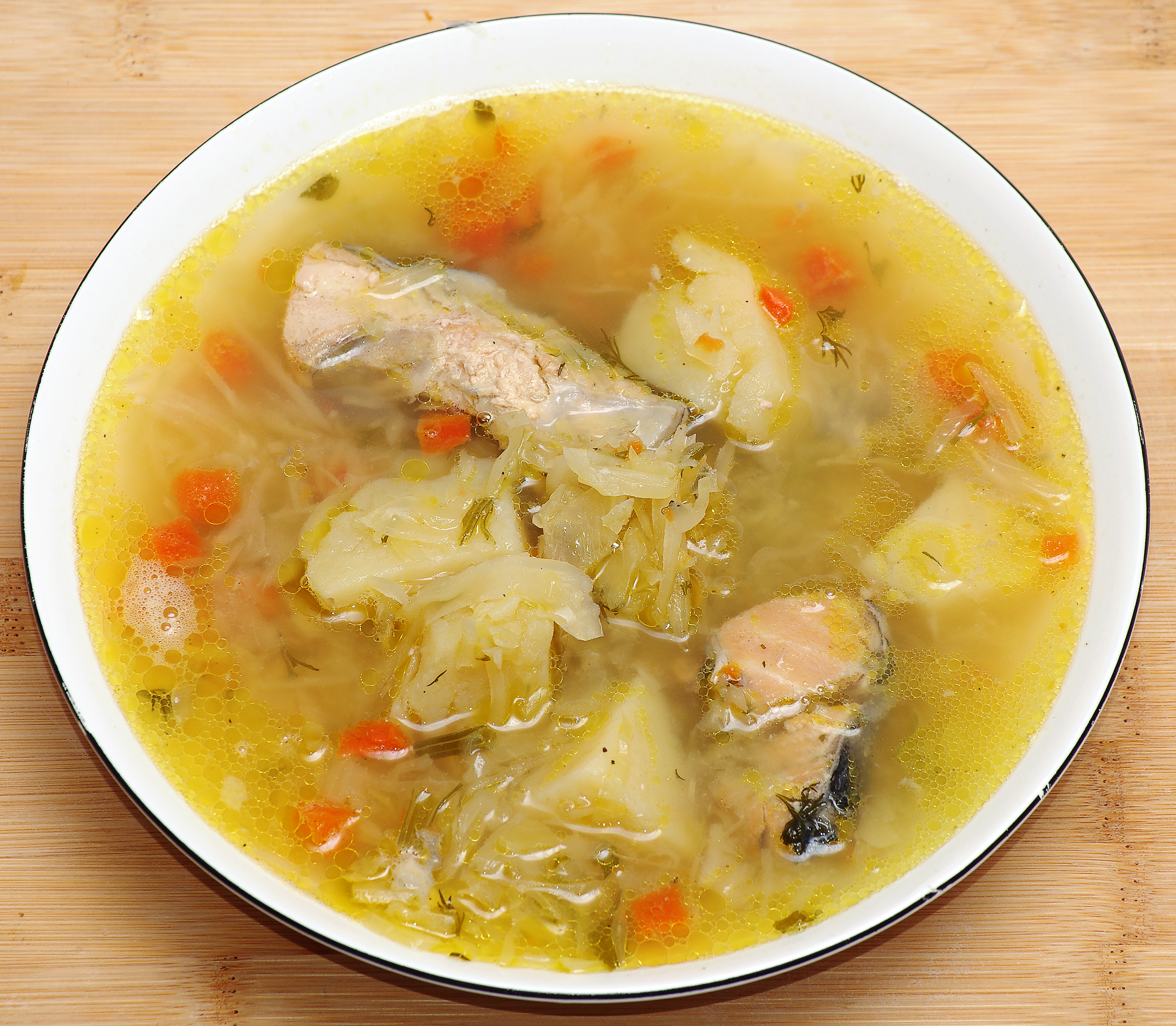
Shchi with fish

The ingredients of shchi gradually changed. Flour, which formerly was used to increase the soup's caloric value, now was excluded for the sake of finer taste. The spice mixture was enriched with black pepper and bay leaf, which were imported to Russia around the 15th century, also from Byzantium. Meat was sometimes substituted with fish, due to reasons related to the Eastern Orthodox Church calendar-related fasting. As for the vegetables, carrot and parsley could be added to the shchi. Beef was the most popular meat for shchi in Russia, while pork was more common in Ukraine. The water-to-cabbage ratio varies and whereas early shchi was often so viscous that a spoon could stand in it, more diluted preparation was adopted later.

== Contemporary ingredients ==
Sometimes, tomato sauces (such as ketchup) are added to shchi (forming a tomato soup).

To mitigate accidental overspiceness, oversaltiness or general sourness of kvashenaya kapusta (e.g. sauerkraut), a portion of cooked pasta (rigatoni, penne or macaroni) can be added to the batch of shchi.

Tushonka can also be found in shchi in place of meat or fish.

On some occasions, caviar d'aubergine (a puree made of cooked eggplants), also called "baklazhanaya eekra" (aubergine caviar) or courgette caviar (made of zucchinis), is added to shchi to improve the thickness of the resulting soup. Caviar (or roe in general, such as pollock roe), can be found in shchi as an artisan additive.

== Linguistics ==
The two-letter word щи contains the letter щ, which lacks a counterpart in most non-Cyrillic alphabets and is transcribed into them with several letters. In German, щи becomes eight letters, Schtschi. Devanagari script can render щи with only one glyph श्ची, albeit one that takes four keystrokes to type श ् च ी which combine to give श्ची.

== See also ==
- Borscht
- Rassolnik
- Solyanka
- Cabbage soup
- Comfort food
- List of cabbage dishes
- List of Russian dishes
- List of soups
- List of vegetable soups
