= List of English words of Ukrainian origin =

English words of Ukrainian origin are words in the English language that have been borrowed or derived from the Ukrainian language. Some of them may have entered English via Russian, Polish, or Yiddish, among others. They may have originated in another languages, but are used to describe notions related to Ukraine. Some are regionalisms, used in English-speaking places with a significant Ukrainian diaspora population, especially Canada, but all of these have entered the general English vocabulary.

Some words such as knyaz are traced back to the times of Kievan Rus, and hence claimed both by Russians and Ukrainians, both claiming the Kievan Rus heritage.

== English words from Ukrainian ==
=== Cuisine ===
Babka (Ukrainian: ба́бка, romanized: babka, related to French baba au rhum, Yiddish באַבקע), type of sweet Easter bread.

Holubtsi (Ukrainian: голубці́, plural from голубе́ць holubets), Canadian English, cabbage rolls.

Horilka (Ukrainian: горілка), type of Ukrainian alcoholic beverage.

Kovbasa or kubasa (Ukrainian: ковбаса́), Canadian English, garlic sausage. Also known as kubie or kubie burger.

Paska (Ukrainian: па́ска, "Easter" = "Paskha"), a rich Ukrainian dessert made with soft cheese, dried fruit, nuts, and spices, traditionally eaten at Easter.

Varenyky (Ukrainian: варе́ники varenyky, plural from варе́ник varenyk), boiled dumplings with a variety of fillings, including potatoes, cherries, strawberries, meat, etc.

=== Ethnic ===
Boyko or Boiko (Ukrainian: бо́йко), a distinctive group of Ukrainian highlanders or mountain-dwellers of the Carpathian highlands.

Cossack (Ukrainian: коза́к, romanized: kozak), ethnosocial group from the Pontic-Caspian steppe.

Hutsul (Ukrainian: гуцу́л), an ethno-cultural group who have inhabited the Carpathian Mountains for centuries.

Katsap (Ukrainian: кацап, romanized: katsap) slang, derogatory, ethnic slur; a Russian, especially from a Ukrainian perspective.

Lemko (Ukrainian: ле́мко), a distinctive group of Ukrainian highlanders or mountain-dwellers of the Carpathian highlands.

Rusyn (Ukrainian: руси́н), an ethnic group of Ukrainians, old endonym.

=== Politics ===
Banderite (Ukrainian: банде́рівець), a member of the Organization of Ukrainian Nationalists or of the Ukrainian Insurgent Army.

Boyar (Ukrainian: singular боя́рин boiaryn, plural боя́ри boiary), a member of the highest rank of the feudal Russian, Bulgarian, Romanian, and Ukrainian aristocracy, second only to the ruling princes, from the 10th century through the 17th century. Many headed the civil and military administrations in their country.

Euromaidan (Ukrainian: Євромайдан, romanized: Euromaidan, lit. 'Europe Square'); series of antigovernment protests in Ukraine that started in Kyiv's Maidan Nezalezhnosti in November 2013.

Hetman (Ukrainian: ге́тьман), rank of Cossack military-political leaders.

Sich (Ukrainian: січ, romanized: sich, historical) a Ukrainian cossack autonomous territory or administration. Usually meaning the Zaporozhian Sich. A town that was part of the greater sich (Січ), the administrative and military centre for Cossacks.

Verkhovna Rada (Ukrainian: Верхо́вна Ра́да), Ukraine's parliament, literally Supreme Council, formerly also translated as the Supreme Soviet.

=== Other ===
Bandura, (Ukrainian: банду́ра), type of plucked string folk instrument.

Chumak (Ukrainian: чума́к), historical and traditional wagon-based trading occupation.

Didukh (Ukrainian: дідух), a Ukrainian Christmas sheaf of wheat used in rituals around Christmas and Epiphany traditionally believed to contain ancestor spirits.

Gotch (gotchies, gitch) Canadian English regionalism for underwear.

Hopak (Ukrainian: гопа́к), lively traditional dance.

Hryvnia or sometimes hryvnya (Ukrainian: гри́вня), the national currency of Ukraine since 1996.

Hucul or hutsul (Ukrainian: гуцульський кінь, гуцулик or гуцул), a pony or small horse breed originally from the Carpathian Mountains.

Karbovanets (Ukrainian: карбо́ванець), Ukrainian currency in 1917-1920, 1942-1945 and in 1992-1996.

Khorovod (Ukrainian: хорово́д), a Slavic art form consisting of a combination of a circle dance and chorus singing, similar to Chorea of ancient Greece.

Kurgan (Ukrainian: курга́н "tumulus"), a type of burial mound found in Eastern Europe and Central Asia.

Naftohaz or Naftogaz (Ukrainian: Нафтогаз), the national oil and gas company of Ukraine, literally "Oil and gas".

Oseledets, style of haircut associated with Cossacks, a topknot.

Pysanka (Ukrainian: пи́санка), decorated Easter egg.

Rushnyk or rushnik (Ukrainian: рушник), a cloth or towel embroidered with symbols and cryptograms of the ancient world used in Eastern Slavic ceremonies.

Serdyuk (historical, Ukrainian: сердюк), a Cossack soldier who serves as a mercenary for the hetman under the Zaporizhian Sich.

Surzhyk (Ukrainian: су́ржик), a mixed (macaronic) sociolects of Ukrainian and Russian languages used in certain regions of Ukraine and adjacent lands.

Tachanka (Ukrainian: тача́нка), a horse-drawn machine gun platform.

Tryzub (Ukrainian: тризу́б, lit. 'trident', pronounced [trɪˈzub]), a trident emblem representing Ukraine, particularly on the coat of arms.

Vyshyvanka (Ukrainian: вишива́нка), traditional embroidered clothing.

== See also ==
- Canadian Ukrainian, a diaspora variation or dialect of Ukrainian
- List of words of Russian origin, many of which also appear in Ukrainian, or are closely related
- List of English words of Yiddish origin, some of which originate in Slavic languages, including Ukrainian
- Lists of English words of international origin
