= Lists of etymologies =

This is a list of etymological lists.

== General ==
- List of computer term etymologies
- List of musician and band name etymologies
- List of chemical element name etymologies

== English word origins ==
- Non-loanwords
  - Proto-Indo-European — Proto-Germanic — Anglo-Saxon
- How words have been loaned from various languages to (many) other languages:
  - Australian Aboriginal — African — Afrikaans — Algonquian — Arabic — Bengali — Chinese — Czech — Dutch — Etruscan — French — German — Greek — Hawaiian — Hebrew — Hindi — Hungarian — Irish — Italian — Japanese — Korean — Latin — Malay — Malayalam — Maori — Nahuatl — Norwegian — Old Norse — Persian — Polish — Portuguese — Punjabi — Quechua — Russian — Sanskrit — Scots — Scottish Gaelic — Spanish — Swedish — Tamil — Turkic — Ukrainian —Urdu — Yiddish
- Lists of foreign words with English derivatives
  - Greek — Latin

See: Medical terminology

== Spanish word origins ==
African — Americas — Arabic — Austronesian — Basque/Iberian — Celtic — Chinese — Etruscan — French — Germanic — Greek — Indo-Aryan — Iranian — Italic — Latin — Semitic — Turkic — uncertain — various

== Romanian word origins ==
Dacian

== Toponymy or placename etymology ==
- List of country-name etymologies
  - British — UK counties — German — India — Irish — Romanian counties — Bulgarian provinces — Brazilian states — U.S. states — Filipino provinces
  - List of etymologies of administrative divisions
- List of national capital city name etymologies
- List of river name etymologies
- List of Australian place names of Aboriginal origin
- List of place names in Canada of aboriginal origin
- List of indigenous names of Eastern Caribbean islands
- Origins of names of cities and towns in Hong Kong
- Lists of North American place name etymologies
- List of place names of French origin in the United States
- List of place names of Spanish origin in the United States
- List of place names in the United States of Native American origin
- List of Chinook Jargon placenames
- Sri Lankan place name etymology

=== Toponyms or names derived from places ===
- List of words derived from toponyms
  - List of chemical elements named after places
  - List of chess openings named after places
  - List of foods named after places
  - List of Guarani toponyms
  - List of inventions named after places
  - List of minor planets named after places
  - List of places named after places in the United States
  - List of places named after places in the Philippines
  - Locations in the United States named for a place in England
  - Toponymy of Maghreb

== Eponyms (names derived from people) ==
- Astronomical objects named after people
- Cartoon characters named after people
- Chemical elements named after people
- Colleges and universities named after people
- Companies named after people
- Countries named after people
- Diseases named after people
- English adjectives named after people
- Foods named after people
- Human anatomical parts named after people
- Ideologies named after people
- Inventions named after people
- Minerals named after people
- Places and political entities named after people
- Prizes named after people
- Scientific constants named after people
- Scientific laws named after people
- Scientific phenomena named after people
- Scientific units named after people
- Sports terms named after people

== Names derived from animals and animal eponyms ==
- List of fish named after animals
- List of places named after animals
