= Pomella =

Pomella may refer to:

- a trademark of pomegranate ellagitannins
- Pomella (gastropod), a freshwater snail genus in the family Ampullariidae
