= List of French words of Germanic origin =

This is a list of Standard French words and phrases deriving from any Germanic language of any period, whether incorporated in the formation of the French language or borrowed at any time thereafter.

== Historical background ==
French is a Romance language descended primarily from the Vulgar Latin adopted by the Gauls and the Belgae, spoken in the late Roman Empire. However, starting in the 3rd century northern Gaul from the Rhine southward to the Loire was gradually co-populated by a Germanic confederacy, the Franks, culminating after the departure of the Roman administration in a re-unification by the first Christian king of the Franks, Clovis I, in AD 486. From the name of his domain, Francia (which covered northern France, the lowlands and much of Germany), comes the modern name, France. In addition, the Frankish conquerors were not the only social class who shifted to northern Gallo-Romance during that period, there was also a sizable minority of Frankish-speaking free peasants who maintained their Germanic tongue for several centuries before shifting to Romance.

The first Franks spoke Frankish, a West Germanic language. As the Frankish Kingdom expanded under the reigns of Charles Martel and Pepin the Short, becoming the earliest Holy Roman Empire under Charlemagne, the common language differentiated into a number of mutually incomprehensible languages of Europe. The main division was between High German and Low German. The dividing zone was the Rhenish Fan. The Ripuarian and Carolingian Franks came to speak a form of Old High German. The Salian Franks spoke Old Frankish or Old Franconian, which later evolved into Old Dutch.

In France, Frankish continued to be spoken among the kings and nobility until the time of the Capetian Kings (10th century). Hugh Capet (AD 987), born to a Saxon mother, was reportedly the first King of France to need an interpreter when addressed by envoys from Frankish Germany. Generally, Frankish nobles were bilingual in both Frankish and Latin. The Neustrian army had received orders in Gallo-Romance since the time of the Oaths of Strasbourg. The situation was not unlike the one in England after the Norman Conquest, with Frankish nobility occupying the role of superstratum language over the existing Proto-Romance language spoken by the populace.

== The development of French ==
As a result of over 500 years of Franco-Latin bilingualism, many Frankish words became ingrafted into the Gallo-Romance speech by the time it emerged as Old French by the mid-9th century. And after the Franks abandoned Frankish, their version of Gallo-Romance tended to be heavily Frankish-influenced, with the introduction of new phonemes, stress-timing, grammatical and syntactical elements, and contained many more loanwords not found in the one spoken by the native Gallo-Romans. Even though the Franks were largely outnumbered by the Gallo-Roman population, the position of the Franks as leaders and landholders lent their Germanized version of Latin to have a greater power of influence over that of the Gallo-Romans; it thereby became the basis of later versions of the French language, including Modern French (see Francien language). It is for this reason that Modern French pronunciation has a rather distinct and undeniably "Germanic" sound when compared to other Romance languages with conservative phonology, which are Sardinian, Italian and Spanish, and is a major contributing factor in why there exists a distinction between northern French varieties spoken in regions where Frankish settlement was heavy (langues d'oïl) vs. those in the south where Frankish settlement was relatively slight (langues d'oc).

Although approximately ten percent of Modern French words are derived from Frankish, Frankish was not the only source of Germanic words in French. Gothic languages, like Burgundian, made contributions (via Provençal), as did Old Norse and Old English via Norman French. Other words were borrowed directly from Old, Middle and Modern versions of Dutch and German, and still others came through the Germanic elements found in Latin (particularly Medieval Latin) and other Romance languages, like Catalan, Galician, Italian, Portuguese, Occitan, and Spanish. Finally, Modern English has made contributions to the French lexicon, most notably within the past few decades.

== Scope of the dictionary ==
The following list details words, affixes and phrases that contain Germanic etymons. Words where only an affix is Germanic (e.g. méfait, bouillard, carnavalesque) are excluded, as are words borrowed from a Germanic language where the origin is other than Germanic (for instance, cabaret is from Dutch, but the Dutch word is ultimately from Latin/Greek, so it is omitted). Likewise, words which have been calqued from a Germanic tongue (e.g. pardonner, bienvenue, entreprendre, toujours, compagnon, plupart, manuscrit, manoeuvre), or which received their usage or sense (i.e. were created, modified or influenced) due to Germanic speakers or Germanic linguistic habits (e.g. comté, avec, commun, on, panne, avoir, ça) are not included.

Many other Germanic words found in older versions of French, such as Old French and Anglo-French are no longer extant in Standard Modern French. Many of these words do, however, continue to survive dialectally and in English. See: List of English Latinates of Germanic origin.

== See also ==
- History of French
- Franks
- Old Frankish
- Influence of French on English
- List of French words of Gaulish origin
- List of Galician words of Germanic origin
- List of German words of French origin
- List of Portuguese words of Germanic origin
- List of Spanish words of Germanic origin
