= List of Portuguese words of Germanic origin =

This is a list of Portuguese words that come from Germanic languages. Many of these words entered the language during the late antiquity, either as words introduced into Vulgar Latin elsewhere, or as words brought along by the Suebi who settled in Gallaecia (Northern Portugal and Galicia) in the 5th century, and also by the Visigoths who annexed the Suebic Kingdom in 585. Other words were incorporated to Portuguese during the Middle Ages, mostly proceeding from French and Occitan languages, as both cultures had a massive impact in Portuguese during the 12th and 13th centuries. More recently other words with Germanic origin have been incorporated, either directly from English or other Germanic languages, or indirectly through French.

Many of these words are shared with the Galician language, with minor spelling or phonetic differences. It is divided into words that come from English, Frankish, Langobardic, Middle Dutch, Middle High German, Middle Low German, Old English, Old High German, Old Norse, Old Swedish, and Visigothic and finally, words which come from Germanic with the specific source unknown. Projections indicate over 600 Germanic words in Portuguese, with a tendency to increase due to English, German and other modern influences.

Some of these words existed in Latin as loanwords from other languages. Some of these words have alternate etymologies and may also appear on a list of Galician words from a different language. Some words contain non-Germanic elements. Any form with an asterisk (*) is unattested and therefore hypothetical.

== Dutch ==
- bombordo: port side of a ship: from French babord "portside", from Dutch bakboord "left side of a ship", literally "back side of a ship" (from the fact that most ships were steered from the starboard side), from bak "back, behind", (from Germanic (*)bakam) + boord "board, side of a ship", see borde below (in Germanic section). Also see estibordo "starboard" below in the Germanic section
- 'berbequim': carpenter's brace: from regional French veberquin (French vilebrequin), from Dutch wimmelken, from wimmel "auger, drill, carpenter's brace" + -ken, a diminutive suffix, see maniquí below in Middle Dutch section.

== English ==
- bar (the beverage establishment)
- basquetebol or basquete (Brazil) = basketball
- bife = steak, beefsteak: from English beefsteak, from beef (ultimately from Latin bōs, bovis "cow", from the IE root (*)gwou- "ox, bull, cow") + steak, from Middle English steyke, from Old Norse steik "piece of meat cooked on a spit", from Germanic (*)stik-, see estaca below in the Germanic section.
- bit, byte, and many other computing terms
- Champô, shampoo or xampu (Brazil) = shampoo
- cheque = Cheque (US English check)
- chute = shoot
- choque = shock
- clicar = to click
- clique = click
- estandarte = adj. standard
- clube = club
- cocktail or coquetel (Brazil) = cocktail
- cowboy,caubói and cobói
- deletar = to delete
- faroeste = far west, Western,
- fashion = adj., fashionable
- futebol = football
- hamburguer = cheeseburger, hot dog, hamburger, fast food
- interface = interface
- lanchonete = snack bar, from the English word "luncheonette"
- marketing = marketing
- mesmerizar = mesmerize
- mouse = computer mouse
- Nylon or náilon (Brazil) = nylon
- revolver = revolver
- realizar = to realize
- Ringue= Ring(boxing)
- sanduiche, sanduíche, sandes = sandwich
- show = adj., something with showlike qualities, spectacular
- telemarketing, know-how
- teste (academic) = test
- turista = tourist
- vagão = wagon
- voleibol = volleyball
- blecaute= blackout
- nocaute = knockout
- folclore = folklore
- gangue =gang
- shopping
- Xerife = Sheriff

== Frankish ==
- aguentar = to endure, bear, resist: from Italian agguantare "to retain, take hold of" (originally "to detain with gauntlets"), from a- + guanto "gauntlet", from Frankish (*)want (see guante below) + verbal suffix '-are' (suffix changed to -ar in Spanish).
- alojar = to lodge, to house, to provide hospitality: from Old French loge, see lonja below.
- alojamento = lodging (hospitality): from Old French loge "dwelling, shelter", from Frankish (*)laubja "covering, enclosure", from Germanic (*)laubja "shelter" (implicit sense "roof made of bark")
- bordar = to embroider: from Frankish (*)bruzdon (source of Old French brouder, brosder and French broder), from Germanic (*)bruzd- "point, needle", from the IE root (*)bhrs-dh-, from (*)bhrs-, from (*)bhar-, "point, nail."
- canivete = penknife, Swiss army knife: from Frankish *knif via Old French canivet
- crossa or croça = crosier (religion): from Frankish *krukkja (stick with a bent extremity) akin to French crosse, Dutch kruk, German Krücke, English crutch, Norwegian krykkja.
- destacar, destacamento (military) = to detach troops: from French détachar (influenced by Spanish atacar), from Old French destachier "to unattach", from des- "apart, away" + atachier, a variation of estachier, from estaca, from Frankish stakka, see estaca below in Germanic section.
- destacar = to stand out, to emphasize: from Italian staccare "to separate", from Old French destacher, destachier, see destacar above.
- escanção = cupbearer, sommelier from Old Frankish *skankjo 'to offer a drink'
- estandarte = noun. a military standard: from Old French estandart, probably from Frankish (*)standhard "standard that marks a meeting place", (implicit sense: "that which stands firmly"), from (*)standan "to stand", (from Germanic (*)standan, from the IE root (*)sta- "to stand".) + (*)hard "hard, firm", see ardid below in Germanic section.
- guante = glove, gauntlet: from Catalan guant "gauntlet", from Frankish (*)want "gauntlet."
- loja = market, building where merchants and sellers gather: from Old French logo "dwelling, shelter", from Frankish (*)laubja "covering, enclosure", from Germanic (*)laubja "shelter" (implicit sense "roof made of bark"), from the IE root (*)leup- "to peel."
- raspar [v] = to scrape, tear, shave: from Frankish *hraspōn, from Proto-Germanic *hraspōną, a derivative of Proto-Germanic *hrespaną (“to tear”), from Proto-Indo-European *(s)krebʰ- (“to turn; bend; shrink”). Related to Old High German raspōn (“to scrape together; rasp”), Middle Dutch raspen, Middle Low German raspen, Old English ġehrespan (“to plunder”). https://en.wiktionary.org/wiki/r%C3%A2per
- raspadinha = scratch card: same as above

== German ==
- acordeão = accordion from akkordeon
- Báltico = baltic from Baltisch
- benzina = benzine from benzin
- Búnquer = from Bunker of possible scots or scandinavian origin
- burgomestre = (City)mayor from Bürgermeister
- chic or chique = Chic from Schick
- chope = draft beer from Schoppen
- chucrute = coleslaw from Sauerkraut
- cobalto = cobalt from Kobold
- estilístico = stylistic from Stylistik
- faustebol = faustball
- caputar = broken from kaputt
- LSD (alucinogénio) = LSD from Lysergsäurediethylamid
- metapsicológico, metapsicologi = metapsychology from Metapsychologie (S. Freud)
- plancton = plancton from Plankton
- poltergeist = poltergeist from Poltergeist
- pragmatismo = pragmatism from Pragmatismus
- propedêutico = introductory from Propädeutik
- protoplasma = protoplasm from Protoplasma
- Quartzo = quartz from Quarz
- Rösti (culinária) = rösti from Rösti (Swiss dish of grated potatoes formed into a small flat cake and fried)
- sabre = sabre from Sabel
- social-democrata = social democrat from Sozialdemokrat
- valsa = waltz from Walzer, walzen
- vampiro = vampire from Vampir
- Vermouth or Vermute = vermouth from Vermut (drink)
- Zinco = zinc from Zink

== Latin words in Portuguese of Germanic origin ==
- bisonte (from L bisont-,bison from Gmc, akin to OHG wisant, aurochs)
- feudal (from Latin feodum, feudum of Gmc origin, akin to OE feoh, cattle, property)
- filtro; filtrar = "filter; to filter" from ML filtrum felt from Gmc, akin to OE felt, felt
- instalar (from ML installare from stallum of Gmc origin, akin to OHG stal, stall)
- sabão = "soap" from Latin sapon-, sapo, soap from Gmc

== Langobardic ==
- palco = a balcony, balcony of a theater: from Italian palco, from Langobardic palk "scaffolding", from Germanic (*)balkōn "beam, crossbeam", see balcão below in Germanic section.

== Middle Dutch ==
- baluarte = bulwark: from Old French boloart "bulwark, rampart, terreplein converted to a boulevard", from Middle Dutch bolwerc "rampart",
- amarrar = to moor a boat, to tie, to fasten: from French amarrer, "to moor", from Middle Dutch aanmarren "to fasten", from aan "on" (from Germanic (*)ana, (*)anō, from the IE root (*)an-) + marren "to fasten, to moor a boat."

Derivatives: amarra 'mooring', amarração 'binding, strong emotional bond, emotional relationship, mooring', amarrado 'determined, obstinate, bound, moored', amarradura 'mooring place, knot or tool'

- manequim = a mannequin, dummy, puppet: from French mannequin, from (probably via Catalan maniquí) Dutch manneken, mannekijn "little man", from Middle Dutch mannekijn, from man "a man" (see alemán below in Germanic section) + the diminutive suffix -ken, -kin, -kijn, from West Germanic (*)-kin (cf. Modern German -chen)
- rumo = direction, course, route, pomp, ostentation: from Old Spanish rumbo "each of the 32 points on a compass", from Middle Dutch rume "space, place, rhumb line, storeroom of a ship", from Germanic rūmaz "space, place", from the IE root (*)reu- "space, to open".

== Old English ==
- arlequim = harlequin: from Italian arlecchino, from Old French Herlequin "mythic chief of a tribe", probably from Middle English Herle king, from Old English Herla cyning, Herla Kyning literally King Herla, a king of Germanic mythology identified with Odin/Woden. Cyning "king" is from Germanic (*)kunjan "family" (hence, by extension royal family), from the IE root (*)gen- "to birth, regenerate".
- bote = a small, uncovered boat: from Old French bot, from Middle English bot, boot, from Old English bāt, from Germanic (*)bait-, from the IE root (*)bheid- "to split".
- caneco = jug: from Old English *can- derived from cunnan
- caneca = mug: *see above 'can'
- leste = east: from French est, from Middle English est, from Old English ēast, from Germanic (*)aust-, from the IE root (*)awes-, aus "to shine".
- norte = north: from Old French nord, from Old English north, from Germanic (*)north-, from the IE root (*)nr-to "north", from (*)nr- "wikt:under, to the left"
- oeste = west: from Middle English west, from Old English west, from Germanic (*)west-, from (*)wes-to-, from (*)wes-, from (*)wespero- "evening, dusk"
- sul = south (combining form): from Old French sud "south", from Old English sūth, from Germanic (*)sunthaz, from the IE root (*)sun-, swen-, variants of (*)sāwel- "sun"
- sudeste = 'southeast' *see above sud+est
- sudoeste = 'southwest' *see above sud+west

== Old High German ==
- agrafo = staple, stitch from French 'agrafe', from OHG chrapfo
- agrafar [v] = to staple, to stitch (a wound, a cut, piece of fabric) from French 'agrafer', from OHG chrapfo
- banca = bench: see banco= bench below
- banco = bench: from Old High German banc "bench, board"
- banco = bank: from French banque "bank", from Italian banca "bench, money changer's table", from Old High German banc, see banco= bench above
- feltro = felt, from OHG 'filz'or Frankish 'filtir'
- feltrar, enfeltrar [v] = to tangle or mat together, to turn smthg. into felt

- bife = steak, beefsteak: from English beefsteak, from beef (ultimately from Latin bōs, bovis "cow", from the IE root (*)gwou- "ox, bull, cow") + steak, from Middle English steyke, from Old Norse steik "piece of meat cooked on a spit", from Germanic (*)stik-, see estaca below in the Germanic section.

== Visigothic ==
- agasalhar [v] = from Visigothic *gasalja (partner, colleague)
- agasalho = coat, warm clothes. From Visigothic *gasalja
- broa = 'corn and rye bread' from Visigothic *brauth
- esgrima = fencing, from Visigothic *skirmja (protection)
- esmagar (v) = to smash, squeeze, crush or grind. From Suebian *magōn 'stomach'
- gabar (v) = to flatter, to bray, to boast, to brag about. From Suebian *hurnjanan 'to blow a horn'
- grampo = clamp, clip, cramp. From *kramp
- grampear, grampar [v] = to clamp, to staple * same as above
- grampa = clip, metal hook, clasp * same as above
- carampão = cramp, clench * same as above
- grampeador = stapler * same as above
- gravar (v) = to carve, record, inscribe. From Suebian/OGrm *graba 'graft'
- gravura = engraving, etching. From *graba 'graft'
- gravação= recording (voice/music/audiovisual). From *graba 'graft'
- guarda = guard, bodyguard, protection: from Visigothic wardja "a guard", from Germanic wardaz, from the IE root (*)wor-to-, see guardar below in Germanic section.
- guardião = guardian: from Visigothic wardjan accusative of wardja, see guardia above.
- atacar (v) = to attack: Old Italian attaccare "to fasten, join, unite, attack (implicit sense: to join in a battle)", changed from (*)estacar (by influence of a-, common verbal prefix) "to fasten, join", from Visigothic stakka "a stick, stake", from Germanic (*)stak-, see estaca in Germanic section.
- ataque = attack, raid. Same as above
- faísca = spark, from Visigothic or Suebian *falwiskan. From medieval 'falisca', cognate of Swedish falaska, Mid-High German valwische (*falwiskō), Norse fọlski.
- faiscar (v) = lightning, sparking. Same as above
- fita = ribbon, tape. From Visigothic/Suebian *veta 'ribbon'
- gavião = hawk, from Visigothic *gabila, akin to German Gabel 'fork'.
- rapar (v) = to shave (hair): from Visigothic *𐌷𐍂𐌰𐍀𐍉𐌽r=hrapōn, from Prot-Germanic *hrapōną||to scrape, from Indo-European *(s)kreb-||to turn; to touch.
- rapado = shaved head, skinhead
- tosquiar = to shear, to cut very short, from Visigothic *skairan

== Germanic ==
- abandonar = to abandon: from Old French a bandon, from a + bandon "control" from ban "proclamation, jurisdiction, power", from Germanic (*)banwan, (*)bannan "to proclaim, speak publicly"
- abandono = abandonment, solitude
- abandonado = abandoned, rejected, derelict
- abordar = to board a ship, to approach, to undertake: from a- + bordo "side of a ship", variation of borde, see borde below
- abotoar = to button: from a- + botão "button", see botão below
- abrasar = to burn, to parch: from a- + brasa "a coal, ember" (see brasa below) + the verbal suffix -ar
- aguentar = "to put up with" (< maybe It agguantare, from guanto "gauntlet" < Old Provençal < OFr guant < Frankish *want)
- aguardar = to wait, wait for: from a- + guardar, see guardar below.
- alemão = of Germany (adjective), the German language: from Late Latin Alemanni, an ancient Germanic tribe, from Germanic (*)alamanniz (represented in Gothic alamans), from ala- "all" + mannis, plural of manna-/mannaz "man" (Gothic manna) from the IE root (*)man- "man"
- ardil = trick, scheme, ruse: from Old Spanish ardid "risky undertaking in war", from Catalan ardit (noun) "risky undertaking, strategy", from ardit (adjective) "daring, bold", from a Germanic source represented in Old High German harti "daring, bold" and hart "hard", both from the IE root (*)kor-tu- .
- arenque = herring: possibly via French hareng, from Germanic (compare Old High German hārinc).
- harpa = a harp: from French: harpe, from Germanic (*)harpōn-.
- arrimar = to approach: possibly from Old French arrimer, arimer "to arrange the cargo in the storeroom of a ship", from Germanic (*)rūmaz "room"
- atrapar = to trap, to ensnare: from French attraper, from Old French a- + trape "trap", from Germanic (*)trep- (seen in the Old English træppe) from the IE root (*)dreb-, from (*)der- "to run."
- bala = a bullet: Italian balla/palla, from Germanic (*)ball-, see beisebol above in Old English section.
- balear = "to shoot"
- balcão = a balcony: from Italian balcone, from Old Italian balcone "scaffold", from Germanic (*)balkōn "beam, crossbeam", from the IE root (*)bhelg- "beam, board, plank."
- balão = a large ball: from Italian ballone, pallone, balla (see bala above) + -one, an augmentive suffix, related to and possibly the source of Spanish -ão (in balão). see here.
- banda = ribbon, band, sash: from Old French bande "knot, fastening", from Germanic '*band-', from the IE root (*)bhondh-, from (*)bhendh-
- banda = band, troop, musical group: from Germanic '*bandwa-', "standard, signal", also "group" (from the use of a military standard by some groups), from the IE root (*)bha- "to shine" (implicit sense "signal that shines").
- bandeira = banner: from Vulgar Latin (*)bandaria "banner", from Late Latin bandum "standard", from Germanic (*)bandwa, see banda = group below
- bandido = bandit, gangster: from Italian bandito "bandit", from bandire "to band together", from Germanic *banwan, see abandonar above
- banco = "bench; bank" (OFr bank < Germanic *banki)
- banqueiro = "banker, financier"
- banca = "bench, seat"
- bancada = "row of seats, stall"
- Abancar = "to settle somewhere"
- banquete = a banquet: rom Old French banquet, diminutive of banc "bench, long seat", of Germanic origin, of the same family as the Old High German banc, see banco= bench above in Old High German section.
- banquetear = "to feast, to have a banquet"
- barão, baronesa, baronato = "baron, baroness, baronet"
- bisonte = Bison bison: from Latin bisontem (accusative of bison) "wisent (Bison bonasus)", from Germanic (*)wisand-, wisunt- (Old High German wisant, wisunt).
- branco = white, white person, blank: from Vulgar Latin (*)blancus, from Germanic (*)blank- "to shine", from the IE root.
- briga = fight, scuffle: from Gothic *Brika-, Old High German Brech-en, Anglo-Saxon break. :Derivatives: brigar [v] 'to fight'
- bloco = a block, a bloc: from French bloc, from Middle Dutch blok "trunk of a tree", from a Germanic source represented in the Old High German bloh.
- bloqueio = "roadblock, blockade"
- bloquear = "to block, to veto, to stop"
- bloqueado = "something or someone which is blocked, halted, trapped"
- boémio or boêmio (Brazil) = a bohemian, of Bohemia, vagabond, eccentric, Gitano, Gypsy: from bohemio/Bohemia (from the belief that the Gitanos came from Bohemia), from Latin bohemus, from Boihaemum, literally "place of the Boi/Boii (from Celtic, see bohemio here) + Latin -haemum "home", from Germanic (*)haima "home", from the IE root (*)koi-mo-
- bola = ball from Proto-Germanic *balluz, *ballô (“ball”), from Proto-Indo-European *bʰoln- (“bubble”), from Proto-Indo-European *bʰel- (“to blow, inflate, swell”)
- bolas = colloquial bollocks, coward, popular interjection idiom 'ora bolas!' oh my! or damn it!, to express frustration or disapproval. From Proto-Germanic *balluz
- borda = border, edge: from Old French bord "side of a ship, border, edge", from Frankish
- bordar = "to knit"
- bordado = "knit work"
- bosque = forest, woods: from Catalan of Provençal of Old French bosc, from Germanic (*)busk- "brush, underbrush, thicket" (source of Old High German busc).
- bosquejo = a sketch, outline, rough draft: from Spanish bosquejar "to sketch, to outline", probably from Catalan bosquejar from bosc, see bosque above.
- bota = a boot: from or simply from the same source as French botte "boot", from Old French bote "boot", probably from the same source as Modern French pied bot "deformed foot" in which bot is from Germanic (*)būtaz, from the IE root (*)bhau- "to strike", see botar below.
- botar = to throw, to bounce, to jump: from Old French boter, bouter "to open, to hit, to strike, to perforate", from Romance bottare "to strike, to push, to shove", from Germanic (*) buttan "to hit, to strike" from the IE root (*)bhau-
- botão = button: from Old French boton, bouton "button", from boter, bouter "to open, perforate", see botar above
- bóia = a buoy: probably from Old French boie, from Germanic, possibly from Old High German bouhhan, from Germanic (*)baukna- "signal", from the IE root (*)bha- "to shine"
- brasa = a coal, ember: from Old French brese "a coal" (Modern French braise), probably from Germanic (*)bres-, (*)bhres-, from the IE root (*)bhreu-
- buraco = from Proto-Germanic burō, burōną 'hole'
- chouriço, choiriça = Latinezed SAURICIUM, from Suebian/Gothic SAURAZ 'dried, smoked'
- churrasco, churrasqueira, churrascaria, churrascar[v] = from Suebian/Gothic SAURUS
- estaca = a stake: from Germanic (*)stak-, from the IE root (*)steg- "pale, post pointed stick".
- estibordo = starboard side of a ship: from Old French estribord "starboard", (Modern French tribord), from a Germanic source (confer Old English stēorbord). From Germanic (*)stiurjō "to steer", + Germanic
- faca = knife from a Germanic source, uncertain if Old German happa (hatchet, sickle) or Frankish *happja, cognate of French hache, Spanish hacha, English hatchet or axe

Derivatives: facalhão 'eustace', faqueiro 'cutlery or cutlery cabinet', facada 'stabbing', colloquial facada nas costas 'to stab (someone) behind the back'

- gaita = bagpipe Uncertain, but likely from Old Suebian, akin to Visigothic *agaits- 'goat' from Proto Indo-European *ghaido-. Most logical origin as bagpipes were traditionally made from goats skin.

Derivatives: gaiteiro '(bag)piper', gaita 'penis, or swearword akin to "cock"'(colloquial), gaita-de-foles, gaita-de beiços, 'different types or names for bagpipes, gaitar 'to sob or to fail an exam' (colloquial).

- grupo = group: From Italian gruppo, from a Germanic word represented by Old High German kropf "beak."

Derivatives: agrupar 'to group, to organise into a section', agrupado 'part of a group', agrupamento 'act of grouping, a team'.

- guardar = to guard, watch over, keep, observe (a custom): from Germanic (*)wardōn "to look after, take care of", from the IE root (*)wor-to-, "to watch", from (*)wor-, (*)wer- "to see, watch, perceive"
- oboé = an oboe: from French hautbois from haut (ultimately from Latin altus "high") + bois "wood", see bosque above.
- roca = roc, spindle: from Gothic *rukka

Derivatives: enrocar[v], rocar[v], 'to spindle', enrocamento 'riprap'

- saco, sacola = bag, sack, rucksack
- sacar = to snap, to extract, to snatch, to withdraw (i.e. money from an ATM or account)
- saque = withdrawal, theft
- ressaque, ressacar = money order, to collect a money order (i.e. Forex)
- saxónico, saxão = Saxon
- sala, salinha, saleta = a room: from Germanic sal- "room, house", from the IE root (*)sol- "hamlet, human settlement."
- salão = main room of a house (see sala above) + -on, augmentive suffix.
- saxofone = "saxophone"
- sopa = soup (it comes from Sanskrit suppa)
- sul = south
- sudeste = southeast
- sudoeste = southwest
- sueco = Swedish
- suisso, suíço= Swiss
- suíno = swine, pig from Proto-Germanic *swinan 'pig'
- suinicultor, suinocultor = pig farmer from Proto-Germanic swinan + Latin cultor
- suinicultura = porcine breeding from Proto-Germanic swinan + Latin colere
- suinicídio = pig killing from Proto-Germanic swinan + Latin cidium
- tacho = pot, pan
- taco = stick, chalck
- tacão = heel
- talo, talão = stem, branch, heel
- tampão, tampon = tampon
- tampa = "top, lid"
- tapar = to cover, to hide
- teta, tetinha, tetona, tetão = tit, breast
- teutónico = teutonic, powerful
- trampa = a trap: possibly from Germanic, from the same derivation as trampolín (see below) and atrapar (see above).
- trampolim = a trampoline: from Italian trampolino "trampoline" (implicit sense: game of agility on stilts), from trampoli, plural of a Germanic word (*)tramp- (such as German trampeln and Old High German trampen, both meaning "to tread, trample"), from the IE root (*)dreb-,
- toalha = towel
- toalhete = "handtowel"
- toalhinha = "small towel"
- toldo = tarpaulin, cover
- toldar = to mist up, to darken, to sadden
- trepar = to climb, to copulate
- trepada = (informal) shag
- trombone = trombone
- tromba = snout, face
- trombudo = someone unfriendly looking
- tromba d'água = gusty showers
- trombão, trompão = thicker part of a fishing rod
- trombar = to sip down food, to scoff up
- tropa = troop
- atropar = to gather troops
- trupe = group, band, gang, student group, artistic group
- trupar = to knock someone's door
- trotar = to run, a horse running
- tungsténio = tungsten
- vanguarda = vanguard: from Old Spanish avanguardia, from Catalan avantguarda from avant "before, advance", (from Latin ab- + ante "before") + guarda "guard", from Germanic wardaz, see guardia above in Visigothic section.
- vagão, vagonete, vagoneta = "wagon"
- valquiria = valkyrie
- vandalo = "vandal, destructive person"
- vandalismo = "vandalism" (second element only)
- varão, varonil = "male, manly"
- venda = blindfold, from Proto-Germanic *binda; see Old High German binta
- vermute = vermuth
- wagneriano = "Wagnerian"

== Names ==
=== Forenames ===
Ancient Roman-derived names are the most numerous in Portugal and Portuguese-speaking countries. Together with Germanic-derived names they constitute the majority of those (and similarly to most European/Western countries inherited also a number of ancient Greek and Hebrew names) today:

- Alberto, Adalberto = from the Germanic name Adalbert, composed of the elements adal "noble" and beraht "bright". This name was common among medieval German royalty. Used in Western Europe mainly: Aubert (French), Adalbert, Adelbert, Albrecht (German), Adalbert (Polish), Adelbert, Albertus (Dutch), Adalberht, Adalbert, Albertus (Ancient Germanic), Alpertti, Altti, Pertti (Finnish), Abbe, Abe (Frisian), Alberte (Galician), Adalberto, Alberto (Italian), Bèr (Limburgish), Albertas (Lithuanian), Adalberto, Alberto (Spanish)
- Albertina, Alberta = same as above
- Albina = Portuguese, Italian, Spanish, Russian, Slovene, Polish, German, Ancient Roman form of 'ALBINUS'
- Adelaide = from Germanic Adalheidis, which was composed of the elements adal "noble" and heid "kind, sort, type". It was borne in the 10th century by Saint Adelaide, the wife of the Holy Roman Emperor Otto the Great.
- Adelardo, Abelardo = from the ancient Germanic name Adalhard, composed of the elements adal "noble" and hard "brave, hardy
- Adélia, Adelina, Adele, Aline = Portuguese, Italian, Spanish, Romanian, German, Ancient Germanic *ADELA (Latinized)
- Adelino = from Germanic “Athal-win”, meaning of noble birth
- Ademar =
- Adolfo =
- Adosinda = from a Visigothic name derived from the Germanic elements aud "wealth" and sinþs "path".
- Adriano = Portuguese for Adrian in English, Romanian, Polish, German, Swedish, Norwegian, Danish, Russian, form of 'Hadrianus'
- Afonso = from Ancient Germanic Adalfuns, Alfons, Hadufuns, Hildefons. Used in Western Europe
- Afonsina =
- Agildo =
- Agnaldo =
- Aldo =
- Alda, Aldina = originally a short form of Germanic names beginning with the element ald "old", and possibly also with adal "noble"
- Alfredo =
- Aloísio =
- Álvaro = cognate of Nordic ALVAR. From Ancient Germanic Alfher, Alfarr, name composed of the elements alf "elf" and hari "army, warrior". Mainly Nordic= Alvar (Estonian), Elvar (Icelandic), Alvar (Swedish), Alvaro (Spanish)
- Alzira = relatively rare name. 'Alzira' or 'Alzire' is a Germanic name meaning `Beauty, Ornament`
- Amalia, Amália, Amélia, = Portuguese, Italian, Romanian, Dutch, German, from Latinized form of the Germanic name 'Amala', a short form of names beginning with the element amal meaning "work".
- Amaro = from the Germanic name 'Audamar', derived from the elements aud "wealth, fortune" and meri "famous". Variants: Otmar (Czech), Othmar, Otmar, Ottmar, Ottomar (German), Amaro (Spain, specially Galicia and Asturias)
- Américo = Portuguese form of Ancient German 'Emmerich'. In other languages: Emery, Amery, Emory (English), Émeric (French), Emmerich (German), Imre, Imrus (Hungarian), Amerigo (Italian), Imrich (Slovak)
- Anselmo = from the Germanic elements ans "god" and helm "helmet, protection". Used in Western Europe
- Arlete = variation of French Arlette, from Germanic 'Herleva' possibly a derivative of hari "army", era "honour", or erla "noble" (or their Old Norse cognates). This was the name of the mother of William the Conqueror, who, according to tradition, was a commoner.
- Armando, Armindo = a derivation of Herman, from Ancient Germanic Hariman, Herman, Hermanus
- Armanda, Arminda = same as above
- Arnaldo = from Proto-Germanic Arnold, used in Western Europe = Arnau (Catalan), Arnoud, Aart, Arend (Dutch), Arnold, Arn, Arnie (English), Arnaud (French), Ane, Anne (Frisian), Arnold, Arend, Arndt, Arne (German), Nöl, Nölke (Limburgish)
- Arnaldina =
- Anselmo = Portuguese variation of German, English (Rare), Ancient Germanic 'ANSELM' from the elements ans "god" and helm "helmet, protection".
- Astolfo =
- Ataúlfo =
- Aubri = from the Germanic Alberich, derived from the elements alf "elf" and ric "power".
- Austragésilo =
- Baldemar, Baldomero = from Ancient Germanic Baldomar, derived from the elements bald "bold, brave" and meri "famous
- Balduíno =
- Belmiro =
- Beltrão = from the Germanic element beraht "bright" combined with hramn "raven. Used in Western Europe: Beltran (Catalan) Bertrand (English), Bertrand (French) Bertram (German), Bertrando (Italian)
- Barbara = Portuguese, English, Italian, French, German, Polish, Hungarian, Slovene, Croatian, Late Roman derived from Greek βαρβαρος (barbaros) meaning "foreign"
- Bernardo = from the Germanic name Bernard, derived from the element bern "bear" combined with hard "brave, hardy"
- Bernardino, Bernardim = Same as above
- Bernardina, Bernadete, Bernardete = Same as above
- Branca, Bianca = from the Germanic word "blanc" (white, fair). European variants: Blanka (Croatian), Blanka (Czech), Blanche (English), Blanche (French) Branca (Galician), Bianka (German), Bianka, Blanka (Hungarian), Bianca (Italian), Bianka, Blanka (Polish), Bianca (Romanian), Blanka (Serbian), Blanka (Slovak), Blanca (Spanish)
- Bruno = Portuguese, German, Italian, French, Spanish, Croatian, Polish, from Ancient Germanic element brun "armour, protection" or brun "brown"
- Brunilde = from Ancient Germanic variant of 'BRÜNHILD'
- Carlos, Carlo = from the Germanic name Karl, which was derived from a Germanic word meaning "man". An alternative theory states that it is derived from the common Germanic element hari meaning "army, warrior". Used all over Europe
- Carolina, Carla, Carlota = female versions of the Germanic name 'Karl' above
- Clodoaldo =
- Clodomir =
- Clodovil =
- Clotilde = form of the Germanic name Chlotichilda which was composed of the elements hlud "fame" and hild "battle". Saint Clotilde was the wife of the Frankish king Clovis, whom she converted to Christianity. Used in France, Portugal, Italy, Spain
- Clóvis =
- Conrado = from the Germanic elements kuoni "brave" and rad "counsel". This was the name of a 10th-century saint and bishop of Konstanz, in southern Germany. Variants: Konrad, Kurt (German), Dino (Croatian), Konrád (Czech), Konrad (Danish), Koenraad, Koen, Koert (Dutch), Konrád (Hungarian), Corrado, Corradino, Dino (Italian), Konrad (Norwegian), Kondrat, Konrad (Polish), Konrád (Slovak), Konrad (Slovene), Conrado (Spanish), Konrad (Swedish)
- Cremilde =
- Deolinda = from the Germanic name Theudelinda, derived from the elements theud "people" and linde "soft, tender". In decline, mainly used in Portugal, Brazil and Galicia
- Duarte = "Edward", from Germanic Ead "rich" and Weard "guardian"
- Dieter = from ancient Germanic Theudhar, derived from the elements theud "people" and hari "army"
- Djalma =
- Eberardo =
- Edgar =
- Edite, Edith = from the Old English name Eadgyð, derived from the elements ead "wealth, fortune" and gyð "war". It was popular among Anglo-Saxon royalty, being borne for example by Saint Eadgyeth;, the daughter of King Edgar the Peaceful. Variants: Edyth, Edytha (English), Edit (Swedish), Edita (Croatian), Edita (Czech), Édith (French), Edit (Hungarian), Edita (Lithuanian), Eda (Medieval English), Edyta (Polish), Edita (Slovak), Edita (Slovene)
- Edmar =
- Edmundo = Portuguese form of EDMUND. In other European languages: Eadmund (Anglo-Saxon), Edmund, Ed, Eddie, Eddy, Ned (English), Edmond, Edmé (French), Edmund (German), Ödön, Ödi (Hungarian), Éamonn, Eamon, Éamon (Irish), Edmondo (Italian), Edmao, Mao (Limburgish), Edmund (Polish)
- Edna =
- Eduardo = see 'Duarte' above
- Eduarda =
- Eduvigis =
- Edvaldo =
- Edvino = Portuguese form of Edwin, from the Old English elements ead "wealth, fortune" and wine "friend"
- Egil = from the Old Norse name Egill, a diminutive of names that began with the element agi "awe, terror"
- Elba =
- Elder =
- Elgar = from Old English ælf ("elf") and gar ("spear")
- Elidérico = from Germanic Aldric derived from the elements ald "old" and ric "ruler, mighty".
- Elmar, Elmer = from the Old English name ÆÐELMÆR
- Elvira =
- Elsa, Elza =
- Erica/Erika =female version of Eurico, see below
- Eurico, Érico, Eric, Erik = From Old High German êwa "time, age, law" combined with rîcja "powerful, strong, mighty." The second element is also closely related to Celtic rîg or rix and Gothic reiks, which all mean "king, ruler." However, this name can also be a short form of Eburic. Euric was the name of a 5th-century king of the Visigoths.
- Ermenegildo =
- Ermelindo =
- Ernesto = Portuguese form of Ancient Germanic 'ERNST' used in German, Dutch, Danish, Norwegian, Swedish, Dutch, English 'ERNEST'
- Ernestina =
- Etelvina =
- Evaldo = from the ancient Germanic name Ewald, composed of the elements ewa "law, custom" and wald "rule"
- Evelina, Ivelina, Avelina, Evelyne, Evelin = from the Norman French form of the Germanic name Avelina, a diminutive of AVILA. Variants: Eileen, Evelina, Avaline (English), Ava, Avelina, Aveza, Avila (Ancient Germanic), Evelien, Eveline (Dutch), Evelin (Estonian), Eveliina (Finnish), Eveline, Évelyne (French), Ava, Evelin (German), Evelin (Hungarian), Eibhlín, Eileen, Aileen (Irish), Evelina, Lina (Italian), Ewelina (Polish), Aileen (Scottish), Evelina (Swedish)
- Francisco, Francisca = FRANCISCUS, FRANZISKA from Ancient Germanic form of Franciscus (see FRANCIS, Franz, Frans, François, Francisque, Francesco, Francesc, Pranciškus)
- Fernando, Fernão, Fernandino = from a Germanic name composed of the elements fardi "journey" and nand "daring, brave". The Visigoths brought the name to the Iberian Peninsula, where it entered into the royal families of Spain and Portugal. From there it became common among the Habsburg royal family of the Holy Roman Empire and Austria, starting with the Spanish-born Ferdinand I in the 16th century. A notable bearer was Portuguese explorer Ferdinand Magellan (1480-1521), called Fernão de Magalhães in Portuguese, who was the leader of the first expedition to sail around the earth. Variants: Fernand (French), Ferdinand, Ferdi (German), Ferdinand, Ferdi (Dutch), Ferdie, Ferdy (English), Veeti, Vertti (Finnish), Ferran (Catalan), Ferdinánd, Nándor (Hungarian), Ferdinando (Italian), Ferdynand (Polish), Fernando, Hernando, Hernán, Nando (Spanish)
- Fernanda = same as above
- Frederico, Fred = form of a Germanic name meaning "peaceful ruler", derived from frid "peace" and ric "ruler, power". This name has long been common in continental Germanic-speaking regions, being borne by rulers of the Holy Roman Empire, Germany, Austria, Scandinavia, and Prussia. Variants: Bedřich (Czech), Frederik (Danish), Frederik, Fred, Freek, Frits, Rik (Dutch), Fredrik, Veeti (Finnish), Frédéric, Fred (French), Fedde (Frisian), Friedrich, Fiete, Fred, Fritz (German), Frigyes (Hungarian), Friðrik (Icelandic), Federico, Federigo, Fredo (Italian), Fricis, Frīdrihs (Latvian), Fredrik (Norwegian), Fryderyk (Polish), Friderik (Slovene), Federico (Spanish), Fredrik (Swedish)
- Genival =
- Geraldo =
- Germano =
- Germana =
- Gertrudes = from Ancient Germanic Geretrudis, Gertrud. Used all over Europe with variations
- Gilberto, Gil =
- Gildo =
- Gilmar =
- Giraldo =
- Gisele, Gisela =
- Godiva =
- Godofredo = from Germanic Godafrid, which meant "peace of god" from the Germanic elements god "god" and frid "peace"
- Gonçalo = from Ancient Germanic Gundisalvus. See Gonçal (Catalan), Gonzalo (Spanish)
- Gualberto = from the Germanic name Waldobert, composed of the elements wald "rule" and beraht "bright". Variants: Gaubert (French), Wob, Wubbe (Dutch), Wob, Wobbe, Wubbe (Frisian)
- Gualter = see also Valter/Walter
- Guido =
- Guilherme = Portuguese equivalent of William in English, from Ancient Germanic Wilhelm or n Willahelm. See Breton: Gwilherm. Used all over Europe in numerous variations
- Guilhermina =
- Guímaro, Guimaro = derived from old Visigothic ‘Vímar, Vímara’, from ‘Weimar’, a name from any of several places called Weimar in Hesse and Thuringia, from Old High German wīh "holy" and mari "standing water".
- Guiomar = from the Germanic name Wigmar, which is formed of the elements wig "war, battle" and meri "famous"
- Gumercindo =
- Gustavo = from Gundstaf, possibly means "staff of the Goths", derived from the Old Norse elements Gautr "Goth" and stafr "staff". Used all over Europe
- Haroldo = from Old Norse Haraldr derived from the elements here "army" and weald "power, leader, ruler". Variants: Hariwald (Ancient Germanic), Hereweald (Anglo-Saxon), Harald (Danish), Harold (English), Harri (Finnish), Harald (German), Haraldur (Icelandic), Aroldo (Italian), Harald (Norwegian), Haroldo (Spanish), Harald (Swedish), Harri (Welsh)
- Hedda =
- Hélder, Helder, Elder = maybe from the name of the Dutch town of Den Helder (meaning "hell's door" in Dutch) or derived from the Germanic given name HULDERIC; elments hulda "merciful, graceful" and ric "power, rule".
- Helga =
- Hélmut = from the Germanic name Helmut, formed of the elements helm "helmet" and muot "spirit, mind"
- Heloísa =
- Henrique = Germanic name Heimirich meaning "home ruler", composed of the elements heim "home" and ric "ruler". It was later commonly spelled Heinrich, with the spelling altered due to the influence of other Germanic names like Haganrich, in which the first element is hagan "enclosure". Used throughout Europe and the Caucasus: Heimirich, Heinrich, Henricus(Ancient Germanic) Henrik(Armenian) Endika(Basque) Enric(Catalan) Henrik(Croatian) Jindřich, Hynek, Jindra(Czech) Henrik, Henning(Danish) Hendrick, Hendrik, Henricus, Heike, Heiko, Hein, Henk, Hennie, Henny, Rik(Dutch) Hendrik, Indrek(Estonian) Harri, Henri, Henrikki, Heikki(Finnish) Henri(French) Heike, Heiko(Frisian) Anri(Georgian) Heinrich, Hendrik, Henrik, Heiner, Heinz, Henning(German) Henrik(Hungarian) Hinrik(Icelandic) Anraí, Einrí(Irish) Enrico, Arrigo, Enzo, Rico(Italian) Indriķis, Ints(Latvian) Henrikas, Herkus(Lithuanian) Hinnerk, Hinrich, Heike, Heiko(Low German) Herry(Medieval English) Henrik, Henning(Norwegian) Henryk(Polish) Henrique(Portuguese) Eanraig, Hendry(Scottish) Henrich(Slovak) Henrik(Slovene) Enrique, Kike, Quique(Spanish) Henrik, Henning(Swedish) Harri(Welsh)
- Henriqueta = Portuguese and Galician feminine form of HENRIQUE.
- Heraldo = from the Old English name Hereweald, derived from the elements here "army" and weald "power, leader, ruler". The Old Norse cognate Haraldr was also common among Scandinavian settlers in England. This was the name of five kings of Norway and three kings of Denmark. See also Harold and Harald.
- Herberto, Heriberto =
- Herman, Hermano = from the Germanic elements hari "army" and man "man". Used in English, Dutch, Swedish, Norwegian, Danish, Slovene
- Hermenegildo = from a Visigothic name which meant "complete sacrifice" from the Germanic elements ermen "whole, entire" and gild "sacrifice, value". It was borne by a 6th-century saint, the son of Liuvigild the Visigothic king of Hispania. Used in Western Europe: Erminigild (Ancient Germanic), Ermenegilde (French), Hermenegild (German), Ermenegildo (Italian), Hermenegildo (Spanish)
- Hermínio =
- Herminia =
- Hilda, Ilda = From Proto-Germanic Hildr (Ancient Scandinavian), Hild, Hilda (Anglo-Saxon), used in Western Europe= Hilda (Danish), Hilda, Hilde (Dutch), Hilda (English), Hilda, Hilde (German), Hildur (Icelandic), Hildr (Norse Mythology), Hilda, Hilde, Hildur (Norwegian), Hilda (Spanish), Hilda, Hildur (Swedish)
- Hildeberto, Hildiberto = Portuguese variant of Hildebert, Hilbert, from the Germanic elements hild "battle" and beraht "bright"
- Hildebrando =
- Hildegardo =
- Hugo =
- Humberto =
- Idália, Idalina, Ida = Originally a medieval short form of names beginning with the Old Frankish element idal, extended form of Old Frankish id meaning "work, labour" (cf. Ida). Used in Western Europe
- Ildefonso = from Ancient Germanic Hildefons
- Inga =
- Ingrid =
- Isilda = * possibly Germanic, perhaps from a hypothetic name like Ishild, composed of the elements is "ice, iron" and hild "battle". Could be an early version of Isolda.
- Isnard =
- Ivo = Germanic name, originally a short form of names beginning with the Germanic element iv meaning "yew". Alternative theories suggest that it may in fact be derived from a cognate Celtic element. This was the name of several saints (who are also commonly known as Saint Yves or Ives). Variants: Yvo (German), Yvo (Dutch), Erwan, Erwann (Breton), Yves, Yvon (French), Ives (History), Iwo (Polish)
- Ivone = female version of Ivo
- Juscelino, Joscelino = from a Germanic masculine name, variously written as Gaudelenus, Gautselin, Gauzlin, along with many other spellings. It was derived from the Germanic element Gaut, which was from the name of the Germanic tribe the Gauts, combined with a Latin diminutive suffix.
- Lars =
- Leonardo =
- Leonildo =
- Leonor, Eleonor, Eleonora = from Occitan Aliénor derived from Ancient Germanic Eanor
- Leopoldo = from the Germanic elements leud "people" and bald "bold". The spelling was altered due to association with Latin leo "lion". Used in Western Europe
- Liduína = female form derived from Ludwin, Leutwin or Liutwin. There are instances where the first element of the name can also be derived from Old High German hlûd "famous"
- Lindolfo =
- Lorelei =
- Lotário =
- Luís, Luiz, Aloisio, Aloysio, Ludovico = from Ancient Germanic Chlodovech, Clodovicus, Ludovicus, Clovis, Hludowig. Used all over Europe
- Luisa =
- Mafalda = variant of ‘Matilde’ (Matilda) in Portuguese and Italian. From the Germanic name Mahthildis meaning "strength in battle", from the elements maht "might, strength" and hild "battle". Saint Matilda was the wife of the 10th-century German king Henry I the Fowler. The name was common in many branches of European royalty in the Middle Ages.
- Manfred =
- Matilde = from the Germanic name Mahthildis meaning "strength in battle", from the elements maht "might, strength" and hild "battle". Used mainly in Western Europe: Mathilda, Maud, Maude(English) Mathilda(Swedish) Mahthildis, Mathilda(Ancient Germanic) Matylda(Czech) Mathilde, Tilde(Danish) Machteld, Mathilde, Mechteld, Maud, Til(Dutch) Mahaut, Mathilde, Maud(French) Mathilde, Mechthild, Mechtilde(German) Matild(Hungarian) Mafalda, Matilde(Italian & Portuguese) Til(Limburgish) Mathilde(Norwegian) Matylda(Polish) Matilde(Spanish) Mallt(Welsh)
- Nivaldo =
- Norberto = from the Germanic elements nord "north" and beraht "bright". Variants: Norberto (Italian), Norbaer, Baer, Bèr, Nor (Limburgish), Norberto (Spanish)
- Odorico =
- Olavo = from Old Norse Áleifr meaning "ancestor's descendant", derived from the elements anu "ancestor" and leifr "descendant". This was the name of five kings of Norway, including Saint Olaf (Olaf II). Used mainly in Northern Europe: Olaf, Olav, Oluf, Ole (Danish), Olaf (Dutch), Olev (Estonian), Olavi, Uolevi, Olli (Finnish), Olaf (German), Ólafur (Icelandic), Amhlaoibh (Irish), Olaf, Olav, Ola, Ole (Norwegian), Olaf (Polish), Amhlaidh, Aulay (Scottish), Olof, Olov, Ola, Olle (Swedish)
- Osmar =
- Osvaldo, Oswaldo = Portuguese variant of Oswald, from the Old English elements os "god" and weald "power, ruler". See also Old Norse name Ásvaldr.
- Osvalda, Osvaldina = female form of Osvaldo
- Oto, Otto = short form of various names beginning with the Germanic element aud meaning "wealth, fortune". Used mainly in Northern & Western Europe: Audo, Odilo, Odo, Otto (Ancient Germanic), Otto (Danish), Otto (Dutch), Otto (English), Otto (Finnish), Otto, Udo (German), Ottó (Hungarian), Ottó (Icelandic), Oddo, Ottone, Ottorino (Italian), Ode (Medieval English), Eudes (Medieval French), Otto (Norwegian), Otto (Swedish)
- Raimundo = from Proto-Germanic *raginaz («council») and *mundō («protection»), Raymund
- Ramiro = Latinized form of the Visigothic name 'Ramirus' (Raginmar) derived from the Germanic elements ragin "advice" and meri "famous". Rare, mainly in Portugal and Spain.
- Raul =
- Reginaldo, Reinaldo, Ronaldo, Reynaldo = from the Germanic name Raginald, made of elements ragin "advice" and wald "rule". Used in Western Europe: Ragnvald (Danish), Reinoud, Reinout (Dutch), Reino (Finnish), Renaud, Reynaud (French), Reinhold (German), Raghnall (Irish), Rinaldo (Italian), Ragnvald (Norwegian), Raghnall, Ranald, Ronald (Scottish), Reynaldo (Spanish), Ragnvald (Swedish), Rheinallt (Welsh)
- Ricardo = from the Germanic elements ric "power, rule" and hard "brave, hardy". Used all over Europe: Ricard (Catalan), Richard (Czech), Rikard (Danish), Richard (Dutch), Richard, Dick, Rich, Richie, Rick, Rickey, Ricki, Rickie, Ricky, Ritchie (English), Rikhard, Riku (Finnish), Richard (French), Richard (German), Richárd, Rikárd (Hungarian), Risteárd (Irish), Riccardo (Italian), Rihards (Latvian), Ričardas (Lithuanian), Rikard (Norwegian), Ryszard (Polish), Rihard (Slovene), Rikard (Swedish), Rhisiart (Welsh)
- Roberto =
- Roberta =
- Rodrigo = from Germanic Hrodric/Hrēðrīc/Rørik/Hrœrekr (Roderick, Rodrick, Roderich; a compound of hrod ‘renown’ + ric ‘power(ful)’), from the Proto-Germanic *Hrōþirīk(i)az; it was borne by the last of the Visigoth kings and is one of the most common Lusophone personal names of Germanic origin.[]
- Rodolfo = Portuguese variation from Ancient Germanic 'Hrodulf', 'Hrolf', 'Hrólfr', Hróðólfr (Ancient Scandinavian), Hrothulf, Hroðulf (Anglo-Saxon), Rudolf (Armenian), Rudolf (Croatian), Rudolf (Czech), Rolf, Rudolf (Danish), Roelof, Rudolf, Rodolf, Roel, Ruud (Dutch), Rolf, Rollo, Rudolph, Rodolph, Rolph, Rudy (English), Rodolphe, Rodolph (French), Rolf, Rudolf, Rodolf, Rudi (German), Ruedi (German (Swiss)), Rudolf, Rudi (Hungarian), Roul (Medieval English), Roul (Medieval French), Rolf, Rudolf (Norwegian), Rudolf (Polish), Rudolf (Russian), Rudolf (Slovene), Rolf, Rudolf, Roffe (Swedish)
- Rogério = from Proto-Germanic Hrodger, Hróarr, Hróðgeirr (Ancient Scandinavian), Hroðgar (Anglo-Saxon), used in Western Europe = Roger (Danish), Roger, Rogier, Rutger (Dutch), Roger, Rodge, Rodger (English), Roger (French), Roger, Rüdiger (German), Ruggero, Ruggiero (Italian), Ruth (Limburgish), Roar, Roger (Norwegian), Roger (Swedish)
- Rolando, Orlando, Roldão = from Proto-Germanic Hrodland used all over Europe = Roeland, Roland, Roel (Dutch), Roland, Rolland, Roly, Rowland, Rowley (English), Roland (French), Roland (German), Loránd, Lóránt, Roland (Hungarian), Orlando, Rolando (Italian), Rolan (Russian), Rolando, Roldán (Spanish), Roland (Swedish)
- Romildo =
- Rosalina, Rosalinda = from Ancient Germanic Roslindis. Used in Western Europe
- Rui = Equivalent to English Roy (Roderick) from Ancient Germanic Hroderich. Used in Western Europe: Roderic (Catalan), Roderick, Rod, Roddy (English), Rodrigue (French), Rodrigo, Roi (Galician), Rodrigo (Italian), Rodrigo, Ruy (Spanish)
- Ubaldo =
- Ulrico =
- Wagner =
- Waldemar, Valdemar =
- Waldevino, Balduíno = from Proto-Germanic Baldovin, Baldwin, used in Western Europe= Boudewijn (Dutch), Baldwin (English), Baudouin (French), Baldovino, Baldo (Italian), Balduino (Spanish), Maldwyn (Welsh)
- Waldir =
- Waldo =
- Walfredo =
- Walter, Valter =
- Wanda, Vanda =
- Wania, Vânia =
- Wilfried, Vilfredo = from Proto-Germanic Willifrid, Wilfrith, Wilfrið (Anglo-Saxon), used in Western Europe= Guifré (Catalan), Vilfred (Danish), Wilfred, Wilfrid, Wil, Wilf (English), Wilfried (German), Vilfredo (Italian) Wilfredo (Spanish)
- Wolfgang =

=== Surnames ===
- Abreu = toponymic, from “Avredo” (avi + redo) derived from Gothic 'avi' grace and 'redo' to give, to offer. See Norman-French Évreux
- Afonso = patronymic of the same name
- Antunes = patronymic form of Antonio
- Aires = Germanic hypocorism of 'Hari' or 'Hêri' meaning army
- Araújo, Araujo = toponymic, from Gothic 'Ruderic'
- Arnaldes = patronymic of Germ. 'Arnold(us)'
- Arouca = toponymic, derived from Frankish or Gaulish *rusk (iris) maybe via old French 'rouche'
- Alencar, Alenquer = toponymic, derived from Ancient Germanic “Alankerk” (Alan + kerk, temple of the Alans) referring to the Alans
- Alves, Álvares = patronymic form of Álvaro
- Bandeira = from Ancient Germanic *bandwa, band-
- Beltrão = patronymic of the same name
- Berenguer, Beringer, Berengar = derived from Ancient Germanic 'Geir', 'Ger' meaning bear and spear (see Geraldo= Gerald)
- Bernardes = patronymic form of Bernardo
- Branco = from Germanic 'blank' (white, fair)
- Esteves = patronymic form of Estêvão
- Fernandes = patronymic form of Fernando, archaic Fernão
- Geraldes, Giraldes = patronymic form of Geraldo
- Gomes = patronymic derived from the Visigothic word guma meaning "man".
- Gonçalves = patronymic form of Gonçalo
- Gondesendes, Gondesende = toponymic form of Germanic 'Gondesindus', 'Gondisalvus'
- Guarda, Guardão = from Germanic 'wardon' (to guard, watch)
- Guedes = patronymic form of Guede < Latinised vădu, < Germanic vâd or Weit
- Guerra = from Gothic 'wirro' (war)
- Guerrinha = from Gothic 'wirro' (war)
- Guerreiro = from Gothic 'wirros' (warrior)
- Gusmão = from Gothic 'gutsman' (goodman)
- Guterres = patronymic form of Guterre
- Henriques = patronymic form of Henrique
- Martins = patronymic form of Martim, Martinho
- Mendes = patronymic form of Menendo (short form of Hermenergildo)
- Moniz = patronymic form of archaic Moninho or Munio
- Norberto = patronymic of the same name, from Germanic Nordberctus, elements 'nort' (north)+ berth (illustrious)
- Nunes = patronymic form of Nuno
- Resende, Rezende = toponymic of Resende, from Suebian 'sinde' and 'sende', derived from the Germanic "sinths" (military expedition)
- Ródão = from ancient Germanic H_{1}reiH- 'flow, river'
- Rodrigues = patronymic form of Rodrigo
- Roldão = patronymic form of the same name, variant of Roland
- Sá = from Germanic 'sal' (room, building)
- Saavedra = combination of Germanic 'sal' + Latin 'vetus< vetera (old)
- Salas = from Germanic 'sal' (room, building)
- Sousa, Souza = Visigothic toponymic, from archaic 'Souza'
- Velêz, Velez = from Visigothic baptismal name 'Vigila' (Wigila), patronymic of Vela (Veila, derived from Vigila).
- Viegas= patronymic form of Egas

== List ==
=== A ===
- abandonar; abandono = "to abandon"; "abandon"
- atacar = "to attack"
- abordar = "to attack (a problem)"

=== B ===
- bala =
- balcão = "balcony"
- bandeira =
- bandoleiro = "bandit"
- banquete =
- barão =
- bébé or bebê (Brazil) = "baby"
- bife = "beefsteak"
- bigode = "moustache" (from German Bei Gott, "By God")
- bisonte
- branco; branca = "white"
- bloco; bloquear = "block; to block"
- bordar = "to embroider"
- bote = "boat"
- bramar = "to bellow, roar"
- brecha = "breach, opening"
- brinde = "toast(with drinks)"
- brio= "spirit", "brio" (Celtic???)
- brisa = "breeze" (Old Spanish briza from East Frisian brisen, to blow fresh and strong)
- brocha =
- brotar = "to sprout"
- buganvília = "bougainvillea"
- burguês = "bourgeoisie", "member of the middle class"
- busca; buscar = "search, find, look for"

=== C ===
- carpa = "carp"
- chocar = "to crash, collide"
- clube = "club, association"
- cobalto = "cobalt"
- comarca = "comarch"
- correia = "strap, belt, leash"

=== D ===
- dália = dahlia (named for Swedish 18th century botanist Anders Dahl)
- dinamarquês = "a Dane, a citizen of the Kingdom of Denmark"
- dança; dançar = "dance; to dance"
- dardo = "a dart"
- debute =
- dique = "a dikewall"
- dólar = "a dollar"

=== E ===
- edredão, edredom = "eiderdown"
- emboscar = "to ambush"
- embraiagem = "clutch"
- enriquecer = "get rich"
- estampar = "to stamp"
- estampida = same as "estampido"; bang, beat, blow (sound like a shot)
- estandarte
- este = "east"
- estuco; estuque =

=== F ===
- falar
- feudal
- feudo
- flibusteiro
- filme = movie, picture
- filtro; filtrar
- flutuar; frota; flotilha
- folclore = from English folklore
- fornido; fornecido
- forragem
- forrar
- framboesa
- francês
- franco (candid)
- franco (money)
- franquear = free, no charge, no cost, for free,
- frasco = bottle, urn, pot, vase, container
- fresco = chilly, icy, freesing, cold
- futebol = football (soccer)

=== G ===
- gabardine; gabardina
- gaita
- galante
- galardão
- galope
- gado
- ganhar
- ganso; gansa
- garagem
- garantia
- garbo
- gardênia
- garrote
- gavião
- gravar
- gripe, gripa
- grisalho
- groselha
- grupo
- gadanha
- guarida
- guarnição
- guerra = germ. warra, lat. bellum
- guerrilha
- gueto
- guia = "a guide"
- guiar
- guilhotina
- guião
- grinalda
- guisa
- guisar

=== H ===
- heraldo

=== I ===
- inglês
- instalar

=== J ===
- jardim

=== L ===
- lastro
- lata
- lista
- lote
- lotaria
- lua-de-mel (calque)

=== M ===
- maleta
- Malta
- maquiagem, maquilagem
- marcar
- marcha
- marchar
- marechal
- marquês
- marquesa
- marta
- mascote
- mação
- mastro

=== N ===
- nórdico
- normando
- norte

=== O ===
- oeste = "west"
- orgulho = pride

=== P ===
- palco
- paquete
- placa

=== Q ===
- queque = "cake"
- quinquilharia = "old junk", "cheap antiques shop"

=== R ===
- rancho
- raça = "race (lineage)" from Italian raza of Gmc origin, akin to OHG rīga, line; OE ræw, row
- raspar
- rata
- ratão
- refrescar
- refutar (Gmc origin???)
- reno
- retaguarda
- rico
- rifa
- rifle
- riqueza
- roubar
- roubo
- rum
- roupa
- rufião
- rumba
- russo

=== S ===
- sala
- salão
- saxofone
- sopa
- sud- /sul
- sueco
- suíço

=== T ===
- tacha
- taco
- tacão
- talar
- tampão
- tapa
- tapar
- tarjeta
- teta
- teutônico
- toalha
- toldo
- tope
- trampa
- trégua
- trepar
- trombone
- trompa
- trompeta
- tropa
- trotar
- tungstênio (Tungsten)

=== U ===
- ufano

=== V ===
- vagão
- valquíria
- valsa
- vadio
- vandalismo
- vândalo
- varão
- venda
- vermute

=== W ===
- wagneriano

=== Z ===
- zinco zinc

== See also ==
- History of the Portuguese language
- List of French words of Germanic origin
- List of Galician words of Germanic origin
- Portuguese vocabulary
