= List of Spanish words of Germanic origin =

Spanish words of Germanic origin

This is a list of some Spanish words of Germanic origin.

The list includes words from Visigothic, Frankish, Langobardic, Middle Dutch, Middle High German, Middle Low German, Old English, Old High German, Old Norse, Old Swedish, English, and finally, words which come from Germanic with the specific source unknown.

Some of these words existed in Latin as loanwords from other languages. Some of these words have alternate etymologies and may also appear on a list of Spanish words from a different language. Some words contain non-Germanic elements (see béisbol in the Middle English section). Any form with an asterisk (*) is unattested and therefore hypothetical.

== Alphabetical list ==
=== A ===
- aguantar "to put up with" (< maybe It agguantare, from guanto "gauntlet" < Old Provençal < OFr guant < Frankish *want)
  aguante "patience, tolerance"

=== B ===
- bala "bullet" (< Fr balle < MFr < Northern It balla < Lombardic balla, palla < PGmc *ballô, cf. Eng ball, Ger Ball)
  abalear "to shoot"
  balear "to shoot"
- balcón "balcony" (< It balcone < OIt balcone "scaffold" < Lombardic *balko, *balkon- "beam", PGmc *balkô "beam", cf. Eng balk)
- banco "bench; bank" (OFr bank < Latin "bench" Back then banking was done "over the bench")
  banca "bench, seat"
- banda "band, group" (< Fr bande < Old Provençal banda "regiment of troops" < WGmc *banda or maybe Gothic bandwō "flag, sign")
  bandada "flock of birds, group of animals"
  bandera "flag"
- bando "edict, mandate" (< Fr ban < Frankish ban)
- bando "faction, party, side" (< maybe Gothic bandwō "flag, sign")
  bandido "outlaw, bandit"
  bandolero "outlaw, bandit"
- banquete "banquet" (< Fr banquet < It banchetto "light repast between meals", dim. of banco "bench" < Lombardic *bank, panch < PGmc *bankiz, cf. bench)
- barón "baron" (< maybe Frankish *baro "free man")
- bistec, bisté, biftec "steak" (< Eng beefsteak, from beef (< OFr buef "ox; beef", cf. Sp buey)+ steak (< ON steik, cf. Eng stick))
- bigote "moustache" (< maybe German bei Gott, "by God")
- bisonte "bison" (< Latin bison, bisōntis, of Germanic origin, cf Dutch wisent)
- blanco "white" (< Germanic *blank)
- bloque "block" (< Fr bloc < Dutch blok)
  bloquear "to block"
- bordar "to embroider" (< maybe Germanic *brŭzdan, cf English board, Dutch boord)
  bordado "embroidery"
- borde "edge" (< Fr bord < Frankish bord "side of the ship")
  a bordo "on board"
- botar "to bounce" (< Germanic *bōtan "to hit", cf Eng beat, Dutch boten)
  bote "bounce"
- bote "boat" (< OEng bāt)
- bramar "to roar, bellow" (< maybe Gothic *bramôn)
  bramido "roar, bellow"
- brecha "breach, opening"
- brindis "toast (with drinks)"
- brida "bridle"
- brocha "broach"
- brotar "to sprout"
- bulevar "boulevard" (Middle Dutch "bolwerc", Dutch "bolwerk", also from Dutch: English "bulwark")
- buque "ship, vessel"
- burgués "bourgeoisie", "member of the middle class" (cf Dutch burg "fortified city", burger "civilian")

=== C ===
- carpa "carp"
- chocar "to crash, collide"
- cinc "zinc"
- club "club, association"
- cobalto "cobalt"
- comarca "region", specifically "comarcas of Spain", etc. (second element only)
- Col(cabbage) = Kohl

=== E ===
- espejo "spiegel"
- equipar "to equip" : from Proto-Germanic *skipōną (“to ship, sail, embark”); akin to Gothic 𐍃𐌺𐌹𐍀 (skip, “ship”). Compare with Old High German scif, German Schiff, Icelandic skip, Old English scip (“ship”), Old Norse skipja (“to fit out a ship”). See ship.

=== F ===
- filibustero "filibuster"
- film "film"
- filtro; filtrar "filter" (noun; verb)
- flotar; flota; flotilla "float"
- folclore "folklore" (from English folklore)
- fornido "strong, robust"
- fornir "provide"
- forrar "cover"
- frambuesa "raspberry"
- Franco "candid"
- Franco "franc (currency)"
- franqueo "postage"
- frasco "bottle"
- fresco "cool"
- fútbol, futbol "football"

=== G ===
- gabardina "raincoat"
- gaita "bagpipes" (especially Galician bagpipes)
- gaje "perk"
- galán "a gallant person"
- galante "gallant"
- galardón "award"
- galope "gallop"
- ganado "livestock"
- ganar "to win"
- ganso; gansa "goose"
- garaje "garage"
- garantía "warranty"
- garbo "grace/elegance"
- gardenia "gardenia"
- garrote "club"
- gavilán "hawk"
- González (gunðe-salaz) "war-hall / castle"
- grabar "to record"
- gripe, gripa "flu"
- gris "grey"
- grosella "currant/gooseberry"
- grupo "group/band"
- guadaña "scythe"
- guagua (bus)
- guante "glove" (< Cat guant< Frankish *want)
- guantelete "gauntlet" (< Fr gantelet, dim. of gant "glove")
- guarcanión
- guarda "guard" (< Germanic *warda "a search with sight" < *wardôn "to pay attention")
  aguardar "to wait for"
  guardar "to save, guard"
  guardia "the act of guarding"
- guarir "to cure; to subsist; to recover" (< Germanic *warjan)
  guarecer "to shelter, protect"
  guarida "den, shelter for animals; shelter"
- guarnición "garrison"
- guerra "war"
- guerrilla "guerilla"
- gueto "ghetto"
- guía "a guide"
- guiar "to guide"
- guillotina "guillotine"
- guión "script/hyphen"
- guirnalda "wreath"
- guisa "guise"
- guisar "cook/stew)
- Guzmán (guts/man) Goodman

=== H ===
- hacha "hatchet/ax"
- halar, jalar "to pull"
- hato "herd"
- heraldo "herald"

=== I ===
- instalar "to install"

=== J ===
- jardín "garden"

=== L ===
- lastre "ballast"
- líder "leader"
- lieja "liege"
- lista "list"
- listón "ribbon"
- lote "lot/portion"
- lotería "lottery/bingo"

=== M ===
- maniquí "mannequin"
- marcar "to mark"
- marchar "to march"
- mariscal "marshal"
- marqués "marquis"
- marquesina "marquee"
- marta "minx"
- mascota "a pet"
- masón "mason"
- mástil "mast"

=== N ===
- nórdico "nordic"
- norte "north"

=== O ===
- ojo "auge"
- oeste "west"
- orgullo "pride"

=== P ===
- palco "box"
- papel "paper/role"
- paquete "packet"
- placa "plaque/license plate"

=== Q ===
- quilla "keel"
- Queso "Käse"

=== R ===
- rachear see rancho
- rancho "ranch" from French ranger, from Old French ranc, from Frankish *hring or some other Germanic source
- raza "race (lineage)" from Italian razza "race, lineage" from Langobard raiza "line, race" (trans. from Latin 'linea sanguinis' "bloodline of descent"), akin to OHG reiza "line"
- raspar "to scrape"
- ratón "mouse"
- refrescar "to refresh"
- reno "reindeer"
- retaguardia "rearguard"
- rico(a) "rich/tasty"
- rifa "raffle"
- rifle "rifle"
- riqueza "wealth/riches"
- robar "to rob"
- robo "robbery"
- rocín "nag"
- ron "rum"
- ropa "clothing"
- rorcual "rorqual"
- rueca "spinning wheel"
- rufián "ruffian"
- rumba "rumba"
- ruso (but see Etymology of Rus)

=== S ===
- sacar "to take out"
- sajón "Saxon"
- sala "living room, room (in general)"
- salón "salon, room (in general)"
- saxofón (first element only)
- sopa "soup"
- sud/sur "south"
- sueco "Swede"
- suizo "Swiss"

=== T ===
- tacha "blemish"
- tachuela "tack"
- taco "taco"
- tacón "heel"
- talar "to cut"
- tampón "tampon"
- tapa "top"
- tapar "to cover"
- tapia "wall"
- tapón "plug"
- tarjeta "card", cognate with English "target"
- teta "tit"
- teutón "Teuton"
- toalla "towel"
- toldo "awning"
- tope "top/stop"
- torio "thorium"
- trampa "trap/trick"
- tregua "truce"
- trepar "to climb"
- trombón "trombone"
- trompa "trunk/horn"
- trompo "spinning top"
- tropa "troop"
- trotar "to trot"
- tungsteno "tungsten"
- tupé "toupee"

=== U ===
- ufano "a smug/boastul person"

=== V ===
- vagón "wagon"
- valquiria "Valkyrie"
- vals "waltz"
- vanadio "vanadium"
- vandalismo "vandalism" (second element only)
- venda "bandage"
- vermut "vermouth"

=== W ===
- wagneriano "Wagnerian"

=== Y ===
- yate "yacht"
- yelmo "helmet"
- yodo "iodine"

== By origin ==
=== Franconian ===
Old Frankish evolved to Old Dutch between 500 and 800 AD. Around 1200 AD Old Dutch evolved to Middle Dutch. Around the 16th century, Modern Dutch evolved out of Middle Dutch.

==== Frankish ====
- aguantar= to endure, bear, resist: from Italian agguantare "to retain, take hold of" (originally "to detain with gauntlets"), from a- + guanto "gauntlet", from Frankish (*)want (see guante below) + verbal suffix -are (suffix changed to -ar in Spanish).
- alojar= to lodge, to house, to provide hospitality: from Catalan allotjar, from llotja from Old French loge, see lonja below.
- borde= border, edge: from Old French bord "side of a ship, border, edge", from Frankish (*)bord "table", from Germanic (*)burd-.
- bordar= to embroider: from Frankish (*)bruzdon (source of Old French brouder, brosder and French broder), from Germanic (*)bruzd- "point, needle", from the IE root (*)bhrs-dh-, from (*)bhrs-, from (*)bhar-, "point, nail."
- bosque= forest, woods: from Catalan of Provençal of Old French bosc, from Germanic (*)busk- "brush, underbrush, thicket" (source of Old High German busc).
- bosquejo= a sketch, outline, rough draft: from Spanish bosquejar "to sketch, to outline", probably from Catalan bosquejar from bosc, see bosque above.
- destacar= to detach troops: from French détachar (influenced by Spanish atacar), from Old French destachier "to unattach", from des- "apart, away" + atachier, a variation of estachier, from estaca, from Frankish stakka, see estaca below in Germanic section.
- destacar= to stand out, to emphasize: from Italian staccare "to separate", from Old French destacher, destachier, see destacar above.
- estandarte= a military standard: from Old French estandart, probably from Frankish (*)standhard "standard that marks a meeting place", (implicit sense: "that which stands firmly"), from (*)standan "to stand", (from Germanic (*)standan, from the IE root (*)sta- "to stand") + (*)hard "hard, firm", see ardid below in Germanic section.
- guante= glove, gauntlet: from Catalan guant "gauntlet", from Frankish (*)want "gauntlet."
- lonja= market, building where merchants and sellers gather: from regional Catalan llonja (Modern Catalan llotja), from Old Frenchlogo "dwelling, shelter", from Frankish (*)laubja "covering, enclosure", from Germanic (*)laubja "shelter" (implicit sense "roof made of bark"), from the IE root (*)leup- "to peel."
- oboe= an oboe: from French hautbois from haut (from Frankish *hauh "high" and Latin altus "high") + bois "wood", see bosque above.
- ranchear, rancho= ranch, From French ranger, from Old French ranc, from Frankish *hring' or some other Germanic source (Old High German hring "circle, ring"), from Proto-Germanic *khrengaz "circle, ring". Shares the root with rank.

==== Middle Dutch ====
- amarrar= to moor a boat, to tie, to fasten: from French amarrer, "to moor", from Middle Dutch aanmarren "to fasten", from aan "on" (from Germanic (*)ana, (*)anō, from the IE root (*)an-) + marren "to fasten, to moor a boat." See Modern Dutch aanmeren.
- baluarte= bulwark: from Old French boloart "bulwark, rampart, terreplein converted to a boulevard", from Middle Dutch bolwerc "rampart". See Modern Dutch bolwerk.
- bulevar: from French boulevard, from Middle Dutch: bolwerc "rampart". See Modern Dutch bolwerk.
- maniquí= a mannequin, dummy, puppet: from French mannequin, from (probably via Catalan maniquí) Dutch, from Middle Dutch mannekijn "little man", from man "a man" (see alemán below in Germanic section) + the diminutive suffix -ken, -kin, -kijn, from West Germanic (*)-kin (cf. Modern German -chen) See Modern Dutch manneken (Belgium).
- rumbo= direction, course, route, pomp, ostentation: from Old Spanish rumbo "each of the 32 points on a compass", from Middle Dutch rume "space, place, rhumb line, storeroom of a ship", from Germanic rūmaz "space, place", from the IE root (*)reu- "space, to open". See Modern Dutch ruim.

==== Modern Dutch ====
.

- babor= port side of a ship: from French babord "portside", from Dutch bakboord "left side of a ship", literally "back side of a ship" (from the fact that most ships were steered from the starboard side), from bak "back, behind", (from Germanic (*)bakam) + boord "board, side of a ship", see borde below (in Germanic section). Also see estribor' "starboard" below in the Germanic section
- berbiquí= carpenter's brace: from regional French veberquin (French vilebrequin), from Dutch wimmelken, from wimmel "auger, drill, carpenter's brace" + -ken, a diminutive suffix, see maniquí below in Middle Dutch section.

=== Anglo-Frisian ===
==== Old English ====
- arlequín= harlequin: from Italian arlecchino, from Old French Herlequin "mythic chief of a tribe", probably from Middle English Herle king, from Old English Herla cyning, Herla Kyning literally King Herla, a king of Germanic mythology identified with Odin/Woden. Cyning "king" is from Germanic (*)kunjan "family" (hence, by extension royal family), from the IE root (*)gen- "to birth, regenerate".
- bote= a small, uncovered boat: from Old French bot, from Middle English bot, boot, from Old English bāt, from Germanic (*)bait-, from the IE root (*)bheid- "to split".
- este= east: from French est, from Middle English est, from Old English ēast, from Germanic (*)aust-, from the IE root (*)awes-, aus "to shine".
- norte= north: from Old French nord, from Old English north, from Germanic (*)north-, from the IE root (*)nr-to "north", from (*)nr- "wiktionary:under, to the left"
- oeste= west: from Middle English west, from Old English west, from Germanic (*)west-, from (*)wes-to-, from (*)wes-, from (*)wespero- "evening, dusk".
- sud-= south (combining form): from Old French sud "south", from Old English sūth, from Germanic (*)sunthaz, from the IE root (*)sun-, swen-, variants of (*)sāwel- "sun".
- sur= south: from French sud, from Old English sūth, see sud- above.

==== Modern English ====
- bar
- básquetbol= basketball
- béisbol= baseball: from Modern English, from base (from Old French base, from Latin basis "base, pedestal", from Ancient Greek βασις basis, from βαινειν bainein "to go, to come", from the IE root) + ball from Middle English bal, (from either Old Norse böllr OR Old English (*)beall) both from Germanic (*)ball-, from the IE root (*)bhel- "to swell".
- bit
- boxear= to box: from Modern English, from Middle English box.
- byte
- chatear= chat (on the Internet)
- cheque= cheque/check
- chequeo= checkup
- choque= shock
- clic= click (on a mouse)
- cliquear= to click (mouse)
- club
- dólar
- cómic= comic, ultimately Greek borrowing (adj.)
- escáner= scanner
- escanear= to scan
- eslógan= slogan
- estándar= standard
- esmoquin= tuxedo, from smoking
- fax
- flash
- fútbol= football
- gay= English, from French
- glamoroso= glamorous
- hall
- hockey
- interfaz= interface
- internet
- jersey= (pullover, sweater)
- líder= leader
- link =(as in the Internet)
- marketing
- mitin= meeting
- módem= modem
- mouse (device)
- náilon= nylon
- píxel= pixel
- pudin= pudding
- ranking/ranquin
- rock = (as in music)
- rosbif = roast beef
- sandwich
- sexy/sexi
- shampú or champú "shampoo"
- shock
- software
- startup
- show
- examen "test"
- telemarketing, know-how
- turista= tourist
- vagón= wagon
- voleibol = volleyball
- yanqui= yankee
- yate= yacht

=== High German ===
==== Old High German ====
- banca= bench: see banco= bench below
- banco= bench: from Old High German banc "bench, board"
- banco= bank: from French banque "bank", from Italian banca "bench, money changer's table", from Old High German banc, see banco= bench above
- banqueta= backless bench, stool, sidewalk (Mexico): diminutive of banca, see banca above.

=== North-Germanic ===
==== Old Norse ====
- bistec= steak, beefsteak: from English beefsteak, from beef (ultimately from Latin bōs, bovis "cow", from the IE root (*)gwou- "ox, bull, cow") + steak, from Middle English steyke, from Old Norse steik "piece of meat cooked on a spit", from Germanic (*)stik-, see estaca below in the Germanic section.

=== Other ===
==== Langobardic ====
- palco= a balcony, balcony of a theater: from Italian palco, from Langobardic palko "scaffolding", from Germanic (*)balkōn "beam, crossbeam", see balcón below in Germanic section.

==== Visigothic ====
- agasajar= to flatter: from agasajo (see agasajo below) + the verbal suffix -ar
- agasajo= entertainment, kind reception, friendliness, flattery: from a- + Old Spanish gasajo "reception" from Visigothic gasalja "companion, comrade", from ga- with, together (from the IE root (*)kom) + sal- "room, lodging" (see sala below in the Germanic section).
- guardia= guard, bodyguard, protection: from Visigothic wardja "a guard", from Germanic wardaz, from the IE root (*)wor-to-, see guardar below in Germanic section.
- guardián= guardian: from Visigothic wardjan accusative of wardja, see guardia above.
- atacar= to attack: Old Italian attaccare "to fasten, join, unite, attack (implicit sense: to join in a battle)", changed from (*)estacar (by influence of a-, common verbal prefix) "to fasten, join", from Visigothic stakka "a stick, stake", from Germanic (*)stak-, see estaca in Germanic section.

=== Germanic of unidentified origin ===
- abanderado= standard-bearer, also standard-bearing (adjective): from a- + bandera, (see bandera below) + -ado, from Latin -atus, noun suffix derived the adjective suffix -atus.
- abandonar= to abandon: from Old French a bandon, from a + bandon "control" from ban "proclamation, jurisdiction, power", from Germanic (*)banwan, (*)bannan "to proclaim, speak publicly".
- abordar= to board a ship, to approach, to undertake: from a- + bordo "side of a ship", variation of borde, see borde below
- abotonar: to button: from a- + botón "button", see botón below
- abrasar= to burn, to parch: from a- + brasa "a coal, ember" (see brasa below) + the verbal suffix -ar
- aguardar= to wait, wait for: from a- + guardar, see guardar below.
- alemán= of Germany (adjective), the German language: from Late Latin Alemanni, an ancient Germanic tribe, from Germanic (*)alamanniz (represented in Gothic alamans), from ala- "all" + mannis, plural of manna-/mannaz "man" (Gothic manna) from the IE root (*)man- "man".
- ardid= trick, scheme, ruse: from Old Spanish ardid "risky undertaking in war", from Catalan ardit (noun) "risky undertaking, strategy", from ardit (adjective) "daring, bold", from a Germanic source represented in Old High German harti "daring, bold" and hart "hard", both from the IE root (*)kor-tu-.
- arenque= herring: possibly via French hareng, from Germanic (compare Old High German hārinc).
- arpa= a harp: from French: harpe, from Germanic (*)harpōn-.
- arrimar= to approach: possibly from Old French arrimer, arimer "to arrange the cargo in the storeroom of a ship", from Germanic (*)rūmaz "room"
- atrapar= to trap, to ensnare: from French attraper, from Old French a- + trape "trap", from Germanic (*)trep- (seen in the Old English træppe) from the IE root (*)dreb-, from (*)der- "to run."
- bala= a bullet: Italian balla/palla, from Germanic (*)ball-, see béisbol above in Old English section.
- balcón== a balcony: from Italian balcone, from Old Italian balcone "scaffold", from Germanic (*)balkōn "beam, crossbeam", from the IE root (*)bhelg- "beam, board, plank."
- balón= a large ball: from Italian ballone, pallone, balla (see bala above) + -one, an augmentive suffix, related to and possibly the source of Spanish -ón (in balón). see here.
- banda= ribbon, band, sash: from Old French bande "knot, fastening", from Germanic '*band-', from the IE root (*)bhondh-, from (*)bhendh-.
- banda= band, troop, musical group: from Germanic '*bandwa-', "standard, signal", also "group" (from the use of a military standard by some groups), from the IE root (*)bha- "to shine" (implicit sense "signal that shines").
- bandera= banner: from Vulgar Latin (*)bandaria "banner", from Late Latin bandum "standard", from Germanic (*)bandwa, see banda= group below
- bandido= bandit, gangster: from Italian bandito "bandit", from bandire "to band together", from Germanic '*banwan', see abandonar above
- banquete= a banquet: rom Old French banquet, diminutive of banc "bench, long seat", of Germanic origin, of the same family as the Old High German banc, see banco= bench above in Old High German section.
- bisonte== Bison bison: from Latin bisontem (accusative of bison) "wisent (Bison bonasus)", from Germanic (*)wisand-, wisunt- (Old High German wisant, wisunt).
- blanco= white, white person, blank: from Vulgar Latin (*)blancus, from Germanic (*)blank- "to shine", from the IE root.
- bloque= a block, a bloc: from French bloc, from Middle Dutch blok "trunk of a tree", from a Germanic source represented in the Old High German bloh.
- bohemio= a bohemian, of Bohemia, vagabond, eccentric, Gitano, Gypsy: from bohemio/Bohemia (from the belief that the Gitanos came from Bohemia), from Latin bohemus, from Boihaemum, literally "place of the Boi/Boii (from Celtic, see bohemio here) + Latin -haemum "home", from Germanic (*)haima "home", from the IE root (*)koi-mo-, from (*)koi-, variant of (*)kei- "bed, couch; beloved, dear".
- bota= a boot: from or simply from the same source as French botte "boot", from Old French bote "boot", probably from the same source as Modern French pied bot "deformed foot" in which bot is from Germanic (*)būtaz, from the IE root (*)bhau- "to strike", see botar below.
- botar= to throw, to bounce, to jump: from Old French boter, bouter "to open, to hit, to strike, to perforate", from Romance bottare "to strike, to push, to shove", from Germanic (*) buttan "to hit, to strike" from the IE root (*)bhau-.
- bote+ a bounce: see botar above
- botón= button: from Old French boton, bouton "button", from boter, bouter "to open, perforate", see botar above
- boya= a buoy: probably from Old French boie, from Germanic, possibly from Old High German bouhhan, from Germanic (*)baukna- "signal", from the IE root (*)bha- "to shine".
- brasa= a coal, ember: from Old French brese "a coal" (Modern French braise), probably from Germanic (*)bres-, (*)bhres-, from the IE root (*)bhreu-.
- dibujar= to draw, represent with lines: older Spanish meanings include "to represent, to paint, to sculpt, to do wood carving", probably from Old French deboissier "to sculpt in wood", from de- + bois "wood", from Germanic (*)busk-, see bosque above.
- estaca= a stake: from Germanic (*)stak-, from the IE root (*)steg- "pale, post pointed stick".
- estribor= starboard side of a ship: from Old French estribord "starboard", (Modern French tribord), from a Germanic source (confer Old English stēorbord). From Germanic (*)stiurjō "to steer", + Germanic (*)'burd-, see borde above
- grupo= group: rom Italian gruppo, from a Germanic word represented by Old High German kropf "beak."
- guardar= to guard, watch over, keep, observe (a custom): from Germanic (*)wardōn "to look after, take care of", from the IE root (*)wor-to-, "to watch", from (*)wor-, (*)wer- "to see, watch, perceive".
- sala= a room: from Germanic sal- "room, house", from the IE root (*)sol- "hamlet, human settlement."
- salón= main room of a house (see sala above) + -on, augmentive suffix.
- trampa= a trap: possibly from Germanic, from the same derivation as trampolín (see below) and atrapar (see above).
- trampolín= a trampoline: from Italian trampolino "trampoline" (implicit sense: game of agility on stilts), from trampoli, plural of a Germanic word (*)tramp- (such as German trampeln and Old High German trampen, both meaning "to tread, trample"), from the IE root (*)dreb-, from (*)der- "to run."
- vanguardia= vanguard: from Old Spanish avanguardia, from Catalan avantguarda from avant "before, advance", (from Latin ab- + ante "before") + guarda "guard", from Germanic wardaz, see guardia above in Visigothic section.

=== Latin words of Germanic origin ===
- bisonte (from L bisont-, bison from Gmc, akin to OHG wisant, aurochs)
- filtro; filtrar= "filter; to filter" from ML filtrum felt from Gmc, akin to OE felt, felt
- jabon= "soap" from Latin sapon-, sapo, soap from Gmc

== Names ==
=== Forenames ===
- Abelardo
- Adalberto
- Adela
- Adelaida
- Adelia
- Adelina
- Adelita
- Adolfito
- Adolfo
- Adosinda
- Alarico
- Alberto
- Alfonso
- Alfredo
- Alicia
- Alita
- Alonso
- Álvaro
- Amalia
- Amelia
- América
- Américo = Italian Amerigo from Visigothic Amalric from amal "labour, work" + ric "kingdom, rule, domain"
- Anselma
- Anselmo
- Armando
- Astrid
- Baldomero
- Balduino
- Baudelio
- Bermudo
- Bermundo
- Bernardino
- Bernardita
- Bernardo
- Berta
- Blanca
- Braulio
- Brunilda
- Bruno
- Canuto
- Carla
- Carlito
- Carlitos
- Carlos
- Carlota
- Carolina
- Claudomiro
- Clotilde
- Conrado
- Curro
- Dalia
- Eberardo
- Edelmira
- Edelmiro
- Edgardo
- Edmundo
- Eduardo
- Elodia
- Eloísa
- Elvira
- Ema
- Emelina
- Enrique
- Erico
- Ernesta
- Ernestina
- Ernesto
- Etelvina
- Federico
- Fernanda
- Fernando
- Fito
- Fran
- Franco
- Francisca
- Francisco
- Froilan
- Geraldo
- Gerardo
- Gertrudis
- Gervasio
- Gilberto
- Gisela
- Godofredo
- Gonzalo
- Godino = of Visigothic origin, from Gaut 'Goth' or guþ 'god'.
- Griselda
- Gualterio
- Guillermo
- Guiomar
- Gumersinda
- Gumersindo
- Gustavo
- Hélder
- Herberto
- Heriberto
- Hermenegildo
- Hernán
- Hernando
- Hilda
- Hildegarda
- Hugo
- Ida
- Ildefonso
- Imelda
- Irma
- Isidro
- Isidoro
- Ivette
- Jordán
- Jordana
- Lalo
- Leonardo
- Leopoldo
- Lorena
- Ludovico
- Luis
- Luisa
- Luisina
- Lupe
- Lupita
- Matilde
- Miro
- Nando
- Nilda
- Nora
- Norberto
- Olegario
- Olga
- Olivia
- Óscar
- Osvaldo
- Paca
- Paco
- Pancho
- Paquita
- Paquito
- Ramiro
- Ramom
- Raimundo
- Roberto
- Rodolfo
- Rodrigo = from Germanic Hrodric/Hrēðrīc/Rørik/Hrœrekr (Roderick, Rodrick, Roderich; a compound of hrod 'renown' + ric 'power(ful)'), from the Proto-Germanic *Hrōþirīk(i)az; it was borne by the last of the Visigoth kings and is one of the most important Spanish personal names of Germanic origin.
- Rogelio
- Rolando
- Ronaldo
- Rosendo
- Sisenando
- Sisebuto

=== Surnames ===
- Alonso = Galician-Portuguese variant of Adalfuns.
- Álvarez = patronymic form of Álvaro
- Allariz = patronimic from Alaric
- Bermudez = patronimic from Bermudo from Gothic Bermund
- Enríquez = patronymic form of Enrique
- Fernández = patronymic form of Fernando
- García = patronymic form of Garces
- Godínez = patronymic form of Godino
- Gómez = patronymic form of Gome
- González = patronymic form of Gonzalo
- Guerra = From Gothic 'wirr'
- Guerrero = occupational name meaning warrior, from Germanic werra, modern German wirr ("confused")
- Guitiriz = patronimic form of Witiza
- Gutiérrez = patronymic form of Gutierre
- Guzmán = guts/man = goodman
- Manrique(z)= from the Gothic "Aimanreiks" = Man(male) ric (realm/kingdom/power)
- Henríque(z) = from the Gothic "Haimreiks" = Haim(village) ric (realm/kingdom/power)
- Hernández = patronymic form of Hernando
- Méndez = patronymic form of Mendo
- Parra = from Gothic Grapevine
- Ramírez = patronymic form of Ramiro
- Rodríguez = patronymic form of Rodrigo
- Ruiz = patronymic form of Ruy, variant of Rodrigo
- Suevos = patronimic form of Suevo
- Vélez = patronymic form of Vela, which itself is derived from Vigila (Wigila).

== See also ==
- Influence of Arabic on Spanish
- History of the Spanish language
- List of English words of Spanish origin
- List of French words of Germanic origin
- List of Galician words of Germanic origin
- List of Portuguese words of Germanic origin
