= List of Guarani toponyms =

This list contains the toponyms (place names) in Guarani, a South American aboriginal language spoken in Paraguay, Argentina, Brazil and Bolivia.

== Argentina ==
- Carcarañá: "devil caracara".
- Chajarí: "river of the chajá".
- Curuzú Cuatiá: "engraved cross".
- Garupá: "land of canoes".
- Gualeguaychú: "river of the big tiger" and other meanings, no consensus reached.
- Ibicuy: "powdered earth".
- Iguazú: "big water".
- Itatí: "stone tip", or "stone nose".
- Ituzaingó: "hanging waterfall".
- Mburucuyá: "Passiflora".
- Oberá: named after a Guarani chieftain.
- Paraná River: "Copious River"
- Villaguay: "snake cave river".
- Yapeyú: "ripe fruit", or "the place where wind blows".
- Yuquerí: plant species similar to blackberries.

== Bolivia ==
- Guayaramerín: "small waterfall".
- Saipurú: "bubbling water".

== Brazil ==
- Camaquã: "black cave" or "nipple hole".
- Iguaçu: "big water".
- Itaipu: "sounding stone".
- Itaqui: "stony sand".
- Jacuí: "water pheasant".
- Jaguarão: "water jaguar".
- Mirim Lagoon: "small water".
- Quaraí: "water coming out of a well".
- Vacacaí: a composed term, Spanish vaca ("cow") and Guarani ca-á y ("burnt grasses").

== Paraguay ==
- Caacupé: "behind the mount".
- Caaguazú: "lush forest", or "big yerba mate".
- Caazapá: "the place] after the forest"
- Humaitá: "ancient stone".
- Itá: "stone".
- Itapúa: "tip of the stone".
- Itauguá: "place with black stones".
- Mbaracayú: "divine rattle".
- Paraguay: many theories, one of them is "feather crown of waters".
- Ypacaraí: "blessed lake".

== Uruguay ==
The name of the Uruguay River deserves a special chapter, because there are several theses. Among the most accepted: "river of the snails", due to the uruguá (Pomella megastoma) that was plentiful across its shores. Another interpretation is "bird-river" ("the river of the uru", via Charruan, urú being a common noun for any wild fowl).

- Aceguá: "place of eternal rest".
- Aiguá: "running water".
- Arapey: "river with thorny trees", or "river full of canoes".
- Arequita: "water falling from the high rock over the caves".
- Batoví: "breast of a virgin".
- Caraguatá: a local plant (Eryngium pandanifolium and other related species).
- Casupá: "end of the big forest".
- Chapicuy: "fallen dew".
- Chuy: "brown water river".
- Cuareim: "water coming from a well".
- Cuaró: "bitter source".
- Daymán: "ancient stone".
- Iporá: "nice water".
- Itapebí: "fallen stones".
- Guazuvirá: "gray brocket".
- Kiyú: "cricket".
- Merín Lagoon: "small water".
- Paysandú: "wise priest".
- Pirarajá: "fish net".
- Queguay: "creek of the combs".
- Tacuarembó: "river of the tacuaras" (a local species of Guadua).
- Tacuarí: a sort of mate-like plant.
- Tupambaé: "divine object".
- Yaguarón: "water jaguar".
- Yí: "mighty river".
