= List of places named after individual animals =

This is a list of notable towns and other geographic features named after individual animals.

== Places named after horses ==
- Alexandria Bucephalous, former city founded by Alexander the Great in memory of his beloved horse Bucephalus
- Beeswing, Dumfries and Galloway, village in Scotland renamed to honour the racing mare Beeswing
- Coronach, Saskatchewan, community in Canada named after the 1926 Derby winner Coronach
- Marvel Loch, Western Australia, small townsite named after the horse that won the Caulfield Cup in 1905
- Norseman, Western Australia, named after the founder's horse, Hardy Norseman
- Tarcoola, South Australia, named after the 1893 Melbourne Cup winner

== Places named after other animals ==
- Captains Flat, town in New South Wales, Australia, which may be named after a white bullock named "Captain"
- Knights Point, headland on the West Coast of New Zealand's South Island, named after a surveyor's dog called Knight
- Marco, Manawatū-Whanganui, New Zealand, settlement named after a dog owned by the district surveyor
- Beddgelert, Wales, village names after the dog of a prince. Sad story warning.
- Mochdre, Wales, many places in Wales have a name linked to pigs. Believed to be linked to a story in the Mabinogi where Gwydion steals magical pigs and drives them from south to north Wales.
