= Mochdre =

Mochdre may refer to:

- Mochdre, Conwy, north Wales
- Mochdre, Powys, mid Wales
  - Mochdre with Penstrowed, a community which contains the small village of Mochdre
