= List of Spanish words of Chinese origin =

Words in Spanish originating from Chinese

This is a list of Spanish words of Chinese origin. Some of these words have alternate etymologies and may also appear on a list of Spanish words from a different language.

== List ==
- biombo = folding screen: from Portuguese biombo, from Japanese byōbu, from Chinese pingfeng (屏風), "folding screen," from ping "folding screen," + feng "wind."
- bonzo = Buddhist monk: from Portuguese bonzo, from Japanese bonsō, from Chinese fanseng (梵僧) "Buddhist monk," from fan (earlier also pronounced bón) "a Buddhist," from Sanskrit brāhmanas "Brahmin," from brahmán- "priest, prayer" + Chinese seng "monk."
- cantón = cotton cloth: from Cantão, old Portuguese name for Guangzhou, alteration of Chinese Guang-dong (廣東), Kuang-tung, "region of the east," from guang "region" + dōng "east."
- caolín = type of fine, white clay: from French kaolin/caolin, from Kaoling, name of a hill in southeast China where this clay was originally obtained, from Chinese Gaoling (高嶺), literally "high mountain," from gāo, "high," + ling, "mountain, summit."
- charola = serving tray: from charol "glossy varnish," from Portuguese charão, from regional Chinese chat liao (漆料) "varnish," from chat, "varnish," + liao, "material, ingredient."
- china = an orange: shortened from naranja china, "Chinese orange," from Portuguese China, from Persian Cin (چین), derived from Sanskrit Cīna (चीन) (c. 1st century), probably from Chinese Qín (秦), Chinese dynasty (221-206 B.C.). For the etymologically unrelated Spanish word china/chino, see here.
- chinero = cupboard: from porcelana de China, "Chinese porcelain." see china above.
- soja = the soybean plant, a soybean: from Dutch soja "soy sauce, soybean," from Chinese "su/Shu" 菽 thence to Japanese shōyu (醤油) "soy sauce," from Chinese 醬油 jiang-you), literally "oil sauce," or from Cantonese shî-yaū (豉油) from shî "fermented soybean" + yóu "oil, grease."
- soya = the soybean plant, a soybean: from English soya "soybean," from Dutch soja, see soja above.
- té = tea, tea plant, dried tea leaves: from Hokkien (Min Nan) t'e, "(茶) tea," from Old Chinese d'a, "tea," in the three meanings) described above.
- tifón = typhoon: from Cantonese taaî fung "typhoon," (颱風, 大風 influenced by Spanish Tifón from Greek mythology) literally "great wind," from taaî (Chinese dà) "great," + fung (Chinese fēng) "wind."

== See also ==
- Linguistic history of Spanish
- List of English words of Spanish origin
