= List of Spanish words of Austronesian origin =

This is a list of Spanish words that come from Austronesian languages. It is further divided into words that come from Hawaiian, Javanese, Malay, and Tagalog. Some of these words have alternate etymologies and may also appear on a list of Spanish words from a different language.

== Hawaiian ==
- canaco= Polynesian (adjective) & a Polynesian person: from Hawaiian kanáka "to be human."

== Javanese ==
- junco= junk (ship): from Portuguese junco, from Javanese or Malay jong "boat," "ship."

== Malay ==
- bambú= bamboo: probably from Malay bambú "bamboo."
- cacatúa= cockatoo: from Malay kakatua, "cockatoo," from kakak "older sister" + tua "old."
- casuarina= Casuarina: from Malay kěsuari "," + -ina (diminutive suffix). Named for the similarity in appearance between the little branches of the tree and the feathers of the casuario (see following).
- casuario= cassowary: from Malay kěsuari.
- compound= compound (enclosure): from Malay "koapong" meaning fenced enclosure.
- lancha= launch (boat): from Portuguese lancha, from Malay lancha, lancharan, "boat," from lanchar "velocity without effort," "action of gliding smoothly" (said primarily of boats and turtles).
- malayo= a Malay person: from Malay Mělayu, of uncertain origin.
- orangután= orangutan: from Malay ōrang hūtan "person of the jungle," from ōrang "man, person" + hūtan "jungle, forest."

== Tagalog ==
Spanish Loanword	Origin	Via	Filipino Language	English Equivalent
abacá	Old Tagalog: abacá		abaká	abaca
baguio	Old Tagalog: baguio		bagyo	typhoon or hurricane
barangay	Old Tagalog: balan͠gay		baranggay	barangay
bolo	Old Tagalog: bolo		bolo	bolo
carabao	Old Visayan: carabáo		kalabáw	carabao
caracoa	Old Malay: coracora	Old Tagalog: caracoa	karakaw	caracoa, a war canoe
cogón	Old Tagalog: cogón		kogón	cogon
dalaga	Old Tagalog: dalaga		dalaga	single, young woman
gumamela	Old Tagalog: gumamela		gumamela	Chinese hibiscus
nipa	Old Malay: nipah	Old Tagalog: nipa	nipa	nipa palm
paipay	Old Tagalog: paypay or pay-pay		pamaypay	a type of fan
palay	Old Tagalog: palay		palay	unhusked rice
pantalán	Old Tagalog: pantalán		pantalán	wooden pier
salisipan	Old Tagalog: salicipan		salisipan	salisipan, a pirate ship
sampaguita	Old Tagalog: sampaga		sampaguita	jasmine
sawali	Old Tagalog: sauali		sawali	sawali, a woven bamboo mat
tuba	Old Tagalog: tuba		tuba	palm wine
yoyó	Old Chinese	Ilokano: yoyó	yo-yó	Chinese yo-yo

== See also ==
- Linguistic history of Spanish
- List of English words of Spanish origin
