= List of Spanish words of French origin =

This is a list of Spanish words of French origin. It is further divided into words that come from Modern French and Old French. In both cases, the words included did not exist in Latin. Some of these words have alternate etymologies and may also appear on a list of Spanish words from a different language.

== List ==
- abigarrado
- alisios
- begonia
- bigote
- blusa
- brocha
- bufanda
- bufete
- bufon
- bulevar, from boulevard
- buzón
- camión
- &cancán
- cerrojo
- chalet
- &chaqueta
- cobarde
- corchete
- &daga
- &danza
- debate
- &destrozar
- estaca
- etiqueta, from étiquette
- extradición
- fraile
- fruncir
- gabinete
- gafas
- galleta
- garaje
- garantía
- guante (glove)
- hola
- homenaje
- hotel
- izar
- jerga
- lona
- manjar
- marrón
- mensaje
- panfleto
- pantalón
- ráfaga
- rampa
- &rifa
- &rifle
- silueta
- sofá
- vinagre
- voyeur
- rojob

== Middle Ages ==
- arnés (harneis)
- bachiller (bachelier)
- borde (bord)
- botín (butín)
- brida (bride)
- cable
- chimenea (cheminée)
- corcel (corsier)
- dama (dame)
- danzar (dancier)
- desmayar (esmaiier)
- flecha (fléche)
- forjar (forgier)
- franja (franje)
- galope (galop)
- galán (galant)
- jamón (jambon)
- jardín (jardín)
- joya (joye)
- ligero (légier)
- lonja (longe
- maleta (malette)
- mecha (méche)
- paje (page)
- tira de cuero)
- trotar (trotter)

== 16th century - 17th century ==
- asamblea (assemblée)
- babor (babord)
- bagaje (bagage)
- banquete (banquet)
- baúl (bahur)
- billete (billet)
- blasón
- broche
- calibre
- carmín
- carpeta (carpette)
- conserje (concierge)
- convoy (convoy)
- crema (créme)
- esquela
- estribor (estribord)
- fresa (fraise)
- izar (hisser)
- marchar (marchar)
- marmita (marmite)
- moda (mode)
- paquete (paquet)
- parque (parc)
- servilleta (serviette)
- taburete (tabouret)

== 16th century ==
- abonar (abonner)
- basalto (basalto)
- batista (batiste)
- billar (billard)
- bisturí (bistouri)
- boga (vogue)
- botella (bouteille)
- bucle (boucle)
- cacerola (casserole)
- cadete (cadet)
- canapé
- catastro (catastro
- compota (compote)
- corsé (corset)
- desertar (déserter)
- edredón (édredon)
- frambuesa (framboise)
- fusil
- grosella (groseille)
- jefe (chef)
- lingote (lingot)
- marmota (marmotte)
- muselina (mousseline)
- pantalón
- pingüino (pingouin)
- silueta (silhouette)
- tul (tulle)

== 19th century - 20th century ==
- acordeón
- aterrizaje (aterrissage)
- avión
- babucha (babouche)
- biberón
- bicicleta (bicyclette)
- bloque (bloc)
- blusa (blouse)
- bol (same)
- bombón (bonbon)
- brasier (brassieres)
- bretel (bretelee)
- brochado (de broché)
- bujía (bougie)
- bulevar (boulevard)
- burocracia (bureaucratie)
- cabina (cabine)
- cabotaje (cabotage)
- camión
- carnet
- chalet
- chance
- chaqueta (jaquette)
- chasis (chassis)
- chimpancé (chimpanzé)
- comité
- consomé (consommé)
- coñac (cognac)
- cremallera (cremaillére)
- croquis
- debutar (débuter)
- doblaje (doublage)
- engranar (engrener)
- entrenar (entrainer)
- escalope
- esquí (ski)
- faya (faille)
- ficha (fiche)
- filmar (filmer)
- flan
- frac
- franela (flanelle)
- garaje (garage)
- gripe (grippe)
- higiene (hygiéne)
- hotel
- kilometraje (kilométrage)
- levita (lévito)
- lote (lot)
- maquillaje (maquillage)
- marrón
- nicotina (nicotine)
- complot
- paletó (paletot)
- pana (panne)
- patriota (patriote)
- pelotón
- percal (percale)
- pilotaje (pilotage)
- plisado (de plissé)
- quiosco (kiosque)
- resorte (ressort)
- rodaje (rodage)
- ruleta (roulette)
- rutina (routine)
- tafetán (taffetas)
- toilette

== See also ==
- Linguistic history of Spanish
- List of English words of Spanish origin
- List of German words of French origin
