= List of Spanish words of various origins =

This is a list of Spanish words of various origins. It includes words from Australian Aboriginal languages, Balti, Berber, Caló, Czech, Dravidian languages, Egyptian, Greek, Hungarian, Ligurian, Mongolian, Persian, Slavic (such as Old Church Slavonic, Polish, Russian, and Croatian). Some of these words existed in Latin as loanwords from other languages. Some of these words have alternate etymologies and may also appear on a list of Spanish words from a different language.

== Australian Aboriginal languages ==
- canguro — kangaroo

from English kanguru, kangaroo, first recorded by Captain James Cook in 1770, from the Guugu Yimidhirr word gangurru.

== Balti ==
- polo — polo

from English polo (1872), from Balti polo 'ball', from the same family as Tibetan bo-lo 'ball'.

== Berber ==
- merino — type of sheep of North African origin bred in Spain

from Berber merīn 'Marinid' (modern Spanish Benimerines), the people of North Africa who originally bred this type of sheep.

- moreno — brown, brunette, dark-skinned person

from moro 'a Moor', from Latin Maurus, from Ancient Greek Maúros, probably of Berber origin, but possibly related to the Arabic مَغْرِب maġrib 'west', from the Semitic root ⟨ġ-r-b⟩.

- moro — a Moor

see moreno above

== Caló ==
- calé — a Romani person

from Caló 'Romani, speaker of Romani', see caló below

- caló — Caló language, also black, dark-colored

the word is possibly related to Sanskrit kanlanka 'blemish, macula' and/or Ancient Greek kelainós 'black'.

- cañí — Caló, Romani person

possibly from cali, feminine of calé and/or caló see calé and caló above

== Dravidian languages ==
- abalorio — glass bead

from Arabic الْبَلُّورِي al-ballūrī 'of the crystal', from بَلُّور ballūr 'crystal, beryllium', from Ancient Greek βήρυλλος beryllos (Note: l and r switched places through metathesis: ballūr from beryllos) from brullion, from Prakrit भेरुलिय veruliya, from Pāli भेउरिय veuriya; possibly from or simply akin to a Dravidian source represented by Tamil வெஇருஒர்; விஅர் veiruor, viar 'to whiten, become pale'.

- brillante — brilliant, diamond

from brillar 'to shine', see brillar below

- brillar — to shine

possibly from Latin beryllus 'beryllium', from Ancient Greek βήρυλλος beryllos; see abalorio above

- mango — mango

from English mango, from Portuguese manga, from Tamil மன்கய் mānkāy 'mango fruit', from mān 'mango tree' and kāy 'fruit'.

- mangosta — mongoose

from French mangouste, from Portuguese mangús, from Marathi मंगूस mangūs 'mongoose', of Dravidian origin.

- paliacate — handkerchief

shortened from pañuelo de Paliacate, 'handkerchief from Pulicat' The Spanish pañuelo de Paliacate is a partial calque of French mouchoirs de Paliacate (1788).
The Real Academia Española (Spanish Royal Academy) claims that Paliacate comes from Nahuatl pal 'colour' and yacatl 'nose'.

- paria — pariah, outcast

from Tamil paraiyan 'pariah', literally 'one who plays the drum', (Note: The pariahs of south India were originally a caste of Untouchables who played drums) from parai 'drum', possibly from parāi 'to speak'.

== Egyptian ==
- aciago = unhappy, sad: probably from Latin aegyptius dies, "Egyptian day," from Ancient Greek Aigyptiakos (Αιγυπτιακός) "Egyptian" (adjective), from Aigyptos, see egipcio below.
- barca = boat, launch, barge: from Late Latin barca, from Ancient Greek báris "flat-bottomed boat, launch" of Egyptian origin.
- barco= boat, ship: from barca, see barca above
- copto= a Copt, the Coptic language: from Arabic qubt, qibt, "Copts," from Coptic gyptios, "an Egyptian," from Ancient Greek Aigýptios "Egyptian" (adjective), see egipcio below
- egipcio = an Egyptian, of Egypt: from Latin Aegyptius, from Aígyptus "Egypt," from Ancient Greek Aigyptos, from regional Egyptian Hikuptah, variant of Egyptian Hat-kaptah, one of the ancient names of Memphis, Egypt.
- embarcar = to embark, to board a ship: from Late Latin imbarcare, from in- + barca, see barca above
- gitano= a Gitano, a Gypsy: from Medieval Latin Aegyptanus, from Latin Aegyptus, see egipcio above.
- papel = paper: from Catalán paper, from Latin papyrus, "paper, papyrus," see papiro below
- papiro= papyrus: from Latin papyrus, from Ancient Greek pápyros, "papyrus," possibly of Egyptian origin.

== Hungarian ==
- coche — car

originally, a carriage pulled by two horses, ultimately from Hungarian kocsi 'carriage, cart', short for kocsi szekér 'carriage of Kócs', the Hungarian city where carriages with suspension were first made.

- sable = a sabre

from Old High German sabel, probably derived from Hungarian szablya (1393), literally 'tool to cut with', from szabni 'to cut'.

== Japanese ==
- caqui — Diospyros plant, and its fruit, the persimmon

from Japanese 柿 kaki 'persimmon'

- quimono — kimono

from Japanese 着物 kimono literally 'thing to be put on', from 着る ki 'to put on, wear' and 物 mono 'thing, person'.

== Ligurian ==
- hoz — sickle

from Latin falx 'sickle, scythe', possibly from Ligurian. (Note: For the change from ⟨f⟩ in falx to ⟨h⟩ in hoz, see Linguistic history of Spanish#Latin f- to Spanish h- to null.)

== Mongolian ==
- mongol — a Mongol

from Mongolian Mongol 'a Mongol', documented first in Chinese měng-kǔ, from uncertain source.

- kan/jan — khan

an honorific title from Turko-Mongol

== Persian language ==
Aside from the fact that Persian words entered through Latin, other words of Persian origin transmitted through Arabic through the Arab Muslim conquest of the Iberian Peninsula during the Middle Ages.

- ajedrez — chess

from Arabic اَلشَّطْرَنْج al-šatranǧ, from Persian شترنگ šatranj from the Sanskrit चतुरङ्ग cátur-aṅga 'four-armed', the shape of the original chess board in India.

- asesino — assassin

from Arabic hashshshin "someone who is addicted to hashish (marijuana)," originally used to refer to the followers of the Persian Hassan-i-Sabah (حسن صباح), the Hashshashin.

- ayatolá — Ayatollah

from Persian آیَت‌ُٱلله âyatollâh from Arabic آيَة اللّٰه āyat allāh 'sign of God'.

- azafrán — saffron

from Arabic اَلزَّعْفَرَان al-zaʿfarān 'safron' from Persian زعفران zaferân or زرپران zarparān 'gold strung'.

- azúcar — sugar

from Arabic سكر sukkar, from Persian سكر shekar.

- babucha — slippers, babouche, from Persian پاپوش pāpūš, literally meaning 'foot covering' via Arabic بابوش bābūš.
- bazar — bazaar, from Persian بازار bāzār 'market'.
- berenjena — eggplant, aubergine, from Persian بادنجان bādenjān, of the same meaning, via Arabic بَاذِنْجَان bāḏinjān.
- caravana = caravan, from Persian کاروان kārvān, a company of travelers, pilgrims, or merchants on a long journey through desert or hostile regions: a train of pack animals, thru Italian caravana, carovana.
- caravasar = caravanserai, caravansary, کاروانسرای kārvānsarāy is a Persian compound word combining kārvān "caravan" with sarāy "palace", "building with enclosed courts", from کاروان kārvān caravan + سرا sarā palace, large house, inn; an inn in eastern countries where caravans rest at night that is commonly a large bare building surrounding a court.
- derviche = from Persian درویش darvish, a member of a Sufi Muslim fraternity, literally translated "mendicant".
- diván = from Persian دیوان dēvān (="place of assembly", "roster"), from Old Persian دیپی dipi (="writing, document") + واهانم vahanam (="house")
- escabeche: Pickle or marinade. From Persian Sekba via Arabic as-sukbaj.
- escarlata = scarlet: from Pers. سقرلات saqerlât "a type of red cloth". a rich cloth of bright color. a vivid red that is yellower and slightly paler than apple red
- jazmín: jasmine. From Persian yasmin via Arabic.
- kan/jan = from Persian khan (خان)
  - meaning "inn", derives from Middle Persian hʾn' (xān, “house”)
  - an honorific title from Turko-Mongol, adapted to Persian
- nenúfar: Water-lily. From Persian nilofer, niloofar, niloufar, via Arabic naylufar.
- roque = rook (chess piece), from Persian رخ rukh via Arabic روخ rukh.
- sah = shah شاه shāh, from Old Persian 𐏋 χšāyaþiya (="king"), from an Old Persian verb meaning "to rule"
- Teherán = Tehran (تهران Tehrân, Iranian capital), from Persian words "Tah" meaning "end or bottom" and "Rân" meaning "[mountain] slope"—literally, bottom of the mountain slope.
- tulipán = tulip, from Persian دلبند dulband Band = To close, To tie.
- turbante = turban, from Persian دلبند dulband Band = To close, To tie.

== Slavic languages ==
- cibelina, cebellina — sable

from Old French zibeline, zibelline, from Italian zibellino, of Slavic origin: compare Russian соболь sobolʹ and Polish soból.

- cuarzo — quartz

from German Quarz, from Old High German quarz, from a Western Slavic form *kwardy, from Slavic *tvrd: compare Czech tvrdý 'quartz, hard' Serbian: тврд/tvrd, Polish twardy, and Russian твёрдый tvjórdyj.

=== Serbian ===
- vampire — vampire
- vamp — a dangerously attractive woman

from Austrian German Vampyre 'vampire', borrowed from Serbian вампир/vampir, 'vampire undead'

=== Czech ===
- pistola — pistol

from German Pistole 'pistol', from Czech pištal 'pistol, tube'

- calesa — kalesa, a carriage with low wheels and a folding cover

from French calèche, from German Kalesche, from Czech kolesa 'calesa, carriage, wheels', from Proto-Slavic *kolo 'wheel', from Proto-Indo-European *kwel-

=== Polish ===
- polaco = a Polack

from Polish pol- 'field, wide and flat territory'

- polka

=== Russian ===
- babushka

from Russian бабушка babuška 'grandmother, old lady'

- rutenio — ruthenium

from Medieval Latin Ruthenia 'Russia', (Note: the element was discovered in the Urals) from Rutheni, Ruteni 'Russians', from Old Russian Русь Rusĭ 'Russia'

- sputnik — satellite

from Russian спутник sputnik 'satellite, moon, companion'

- isba

from Russian изба izba 'log hut'

- vodka

=== Croatian ===
- corbata — necktie, cravat

from Italian carvatta 'wool scarf used by Croatian soldiers in the 17th century' with implicit sense 'Croatian scarf', from Croatian hrvat 'Croat, of Croatia' of uncertain origin, but from the same root as Old Church Slavonic Chǔrvatinǔ 'Croat'.

== See also ==
- Linguistic history of Spanish
- List of English words of Spanish origin
