= List of Spanish words of Indo-Aryan origin =

This is a list of Spanish words that come from Indo-Aryan languages. It is further divided into words that come from Persian, Romani and Sanskrit. Some of these words have alternate etymologies and may also appear on a list of Spanish words from a different language.

== Sanskrit ==
- Ajedrez
- Avatar
- Ario
- Agra
- Añil
- Asana
- Atutía, Tutía
- Ayurveda
- Barandilla
- Bala
- Bandana
- Bonzo
- Bodisatva
- Brahmán
- Brahmanismo
- Bengala
- Buda
- Budismo
- Bután
- Carambola
- Camelar
- Catre
- Chacal
- Champú
- Chakra
- Chita
- Cinta
- Casimir
- Cingalés
- Chita
- Copra
- Devanagari
- Esvástica
- Gilí
- Guar
- Gurú
- Gurja, Gurkha
- Hindú
- Himalayo
- Índigo
- Indo
- Indra
- Jaines
- Jainismo
- Jenjibre
- Jungla
- Karma
- Laca
- Lacerar
- Lila
- Mandarín
- Mandarina
- Maya
- Moscatel
- Mantra
- Mandala
- Naranja
- Nadi
- Naja
- Naranjo
- Narguile
- Nenúfar
- Nirvana
- Ópalo
- Palanquín
- Pagar
- Prana
- Pantera
- Pañí
- Pali
- Prácrito
- Pebre
- Ponche
- Punyab
- Purana
- Quermes
- Rupia
- Raga
- Raja
- Sandia
- Sándalo
- Sánscrito
- Sari
- Sije
- Tanque
- Tantra
- Tántrico
- Yantra
- Vaikunta
- Vedas
- Vedismo
- Viajar
- Visnú
- Yambo
- Yoga
- Yogi
- Zen

== Persian ==
- Alfil
- Añil
- Algarroba
- Almizcle
- Azabache
- Azure
- Azul
- Babucha
- Baldaquín
- Bazar
- Bezoar
- Beige
- Bórax
- Bulbul
- Caqui (Color)
- Caravana
- Carcaj
- Casaca
- Chal
- Chancleta
- Chalina
- Cheque
- Cobré
- Diván
- Escarlatina
- Espinaca
- Gaceta
- Gasa
- Jaque
- Jazmín
- Mate (Chess Term)
- Mago
- Parche
- Paraíso
- Percal
- Persa
- Persiana
- Prisco
- Pijama, Piyama
- Quiosco
- Roque
- Sátrapa
- Serrallo
- Serendipitoso
- Taburete
- Taza
- Tafetán
- Talco
- Tigre
- Tulipán
- Turán
- Turbante
- Zancada
- Zanco
- Zancudo
- Zumbar
- Zoroastro
- Zaratustra
- Zoroastrimo

== Romani ==
- Acharar
- Achantar
- Aroba
- Barojí
- Bato
- Bujarra
- Biruji
- Calé
- Caló
- Catear
- Camelar
- Canguelo
- Chachi
- Chaval
- Chavea
- Chavo
- Chavó
- Chavalo
- Chalado
- Chamullar, Chamuyar
- Chingar
- Chinorri
- Chivato
- Choro
- Currando
- Curro
- Currar
- Chungo
- Churumbel
- Dabutí
- Fetén
- Ful
- Fusca
- Gachí
- Gachó
- Garito
- Gil
- Gilipollas
- Jai
- Jará
- Jaco
- Jindama
- Jiñar
- Junar
- Julay
- Lacha
- Longuis
- Luca
- Lumi
- Manú
- Manús
- Menda
- Molar
- Mulé
- Nastí
- Nanay
- Naja
- Najaero
- Paripé
- Pasma
- Parné
- Pestañí
- Pinrel
- Pipar
- Pisgo
- Pringar
- Potra
- Pureta
- Queli
- Sobar
- Rom
- Vato

== See also ==
- Linguistic history of Spanish
- List of English words of Spanish origin
