= Pomella (gastropod) =

Scientific classification
- Kingdom: Animalia
- Phylum: Mollusca
- Class: Gastropoda
- Subclass: Caenogastropoda
- Order: Architaenioglossa
- Family: Ampullariidae
- Genus: Pomella; Gray, 1847

Genus of gastropods

Pomella is a genus of freshwater snails, aquatic gastropod mollusks in the family Ampullariidae, the apple snails.

As is the case in some other genera of apple snails, Pomella deposits eggs above the waterline in calcareous clutches. This protects the eggs against predation by fish and other aquatic inhabitants.

== Species ==
Species within the genus Pomella include:

- Pomella americanista (Ihering, 1919)
- Pomella megastoma (G. B. Sowerby I, 1825)

== Uruguay ==
The name of the country Uruguay perhaps ultimately comes from P. megastoma, or uruguá in the Guaraní language. The name of the Uruguay River, which gave its name to the country, comes from the Spanish settlers' rendering of the native name the inhabitants of the region used to designate it. This interpretation is considered possible because uruguás are abundant in the river
