= List of Spanish words of Semitic origin =

Spanish words which were originally from a Semitic language

This is a list of Spanish words that come from Semitic languages (excluding Arabic, which can be found in the article, Influence of Arabic on Spanish). It is further divided into words that come from Aramaic and Hebrew. Some of these words existed in Latin as loanwords from other languages. Some of these words have alternate etymologies and may also appear on a list of Spanish words from a different language.

== Aramaic ==
- Abracadabra
- Abba
- Agadá
- Corban
- Fariseo
- Sultán

== Hebrew ==
- Abdón
- Abel
- Abraham
- Aceituna
- Ada
- Ábaco
- Ama
- Adonai
- Adán
- Álef
- Aleluya
- Aliá
- Amidá
- Amén
- Ana
- Aravá
- Asera
- Askenazí
- Asquenazí
- Av
- Bato
- Babel
- Barrabás
- Benjamín
- Bethel
- Bruja
- Beca
- Betsaida
- Brit
- Cafarnaúm
- Caleb
- Carmelita
- Camello
- Camita
- Caraísmo
- Caín
- Comino
- Coralo
- chévere
- Chingon
- Chutzpah
- Dagesh
- Daniel
- David
- Don
- Edén
- Efa
- Efetá
- Efraín
- Elías
- Emanuel
- Enoc
- Esdras
- Ester
- Esther
- Ezequiel
- Fariseo
- Filisteo
- Galilea
- Gapuchín
- Gehena
- Gueto
- Gematría
- Gersón
- Golem
- Gólem
- Hadas
- Halajá
- Hallulla
- Hebreo
- Hitbodedut
- Homer
- Hosana
- Isaac
- Isabel
- Isaías
- Ismael
- Israel
- Israelí
- Israelita
- Jacob
- Jalá
- Janucá
- Januquiá
- Jaredí
- Jebuseo
- Jehová
- Jeremías
- Jerusalén
- Joel
- Jonás
- Josué
- Juan
- Judío
- Jubileo
- Judas
- Kadish
- Keren
- Kipá
- Knesset
- Kosher
- Kotel
- Krav Maga
- Lamec
- Leví
- Lázaro
- Lazareto
- Malsín
- Maranata
- Maná
- María
- mascarilla (In Hebrew - Masekha - מסכה)
- Matusalén
- Mazel Tov
- Melquisedec
- Menorá
- Mesías
- Medida
- Metatrón
- Mezuzá
- Midrash
- Miguel
- Miqueas
- Mishná
- Mitzvá
- Mirra
- Mohel
- Moisés
- Míriam
- Najash
- Natanael
- Neftalí
- Nehemías
- Noé
- Oseas
- Parashá
- Pésaj
- Rabí
- Rabino
- Rafael
- Raquel
- Rebeca
- Rosh Hashaná
- Rut
- Ruth
- Saduceo
- Salem
- Salomón
- Samuel
- Sara
- Satanás
- Satán
- Schlomit
- Selah
- Set
- Shabat
- Sábado
- Shaddai
- Shalom
- Shavuot
- Shekhiná
- Sefardí
- Sefardita
- Sheol
- Shoah
- Shofar
- Shémita
- Siclo
- Simón
- Sion
- Sofit
- Sucot
- Séfora
- Talit
- Tamar
- Tanaj
- Tefilín
- Tel Aviv
- Torre de Babel
- Torá

vino (Encarnación de la palabra semítica yayen)

- Yahvé
- Yeshivá
- Yod
- Yom Kipur
- Zacarís

== See also ==
- Linguistic history of Spanish
- List of English words of Spanish origin
