= List of Spanish words of Turkic origin =

This is a list of Spanish words that come from Turkic languages. It is further divided into words that come from Kazakh, Kyrgyz Tatar, and Turkish. Some of these words existed in Latin as loanwords from other languages. Some of these words have alternate etymologies and may also appear on a list of Spanish words from a different language, especially including Arabic and Persian languages.

== List ==
- bajá, pachá
- bergamota
- calmuco
- caracul
- caviar
- chacal
- cosaco
- horda
- húngaro
- huno
- kan/jan = khan, an honorific title from Turko-Mongol
- odalisca
- otomano
- quiosco, kiosco
- sorbete
- Turco
- turquesa
- visir
- yogur

== See also ==
- Linguistic history of Spanish
- List of English words of Spanish origin

janizari=yeniçeri (name given to Turkish soldiers in the Ottoman Empire)
