= List of Spanish words of Indigenous American Indian origin =

This is a list of Spanish words that come from indigenous languages of the Americas. It is further divided into words that come from Arawakan, Aymara, Carib, Mayan, Nahuatl, Quechua, Taíno, Tarahumara, Tupi and uncertain (the word is known to be from the Americas, but the exact source language is unclear). Some of these words have alternate etymologies and may also appear on a list of Spanish words from a different language.

== Alphabetic list ==
=== A ===
- achira (Quechua) — purple arrowroot (Canna indica) or giant arrowhead (Sagittaria montevidensis)
- aguacate (Nahuatl awakatl) — avocado
- ajolote (Nahuatl axolotl) — axolotl
- alpaca (Quechua allpaqa) — alpaca
- amate (Nahuatl amatl) — fig tree or creeping fig
- anticucho (Quechua anti uchu) — skewered meat
- atole (Nahuatl atolli) — atole

=== B ===
- barbacoa (Taíno) — barbecue
- batata (Taíno) — sweet potato
- bejuco (Taíno) — guaco or bejuco, a type of vine
- biznaga — refers several types of cacti, see Spanish Wikipedia
- bohío (Taíno) — bahareque, an indigenous style of building houses
- Boriquen (Taíno) — name for Puerto Rico
- boricua (Taíno) — inhabitants of Boriquen
- borinqueño — adaptation from the Taíno word Boricua, means Puerto Rican

=== C ===
- cacahuate/cacahuete (Nahuatl kakawatl)
- cacao (Nahuatl)
- cacique (Taíno)
- cacomistle, cacomiztle, cacomixtle (Nahuatl kakomixtli)
- caimán (Taíno)
- calato (Quechua)
- calincha (Quechua qharincha)
- calpulli (Nahuatl kalpulli)
- camote (Nahuatl kamohtli)
- cancha (Quechua kancha)
- caníbal (Taíno)
- canoa (Taíno)
- cañihua (Quechua qañiwa)
- caoba
- capulín
- caraota
- Caribe (Taíno)
- caribú
- carioca
- caraqueño
- casava (Taíno)
- catre
- caucho (Quechua)
- casabe, cazabe (Taíno)
- cayo (Taíno)
- ceiba (Taíno)
- chaco (Quechua chaku)
- chacra (Quechua chakra)
- champa (Quechua ch'ampa)
- charqui (Quechua ch'arki)
- chayote (Nahuatl chayotl)
- Chía (Quechua)
- chicle (Nahuatl tsikitl)
- chilacayote (Nahuatl)
- chile, chili (Nahuatl chilli)
- chinchilla (Aymara)
- chirimoya (Quechua chiri muya)
- choclo (Quechua chuqllu)
- chocolate (Nahuatl xokolatl)
- choro (Quechua ch'uru)
- coca (Quechua kuka)
- condor (Quechua kuntur)
- concho (qunchu)
- coronta (Quechua q'urunta)
- coquí (Taíno)
- coyote (Nahuatl koyotl)
- curaca (Quechua kuraka)
- cuate (Nahuatl koatl)
- Cuba (Taíno)
- Cangil (Quechua kankil )

=== E ===
- ejote (Nahuatl exotl)
- elote (Nahuatl elotl)

=== H ===
- Haití (Taíno)
- hamaca
- henequén
- hicaco
- huaca (Quechua)
- huaco (Quechua)
- huaraca (Quechua warak’a)
- huayco (Quechua)
- hule
- huracán (Taíno)

=== I ===
- iguana (Taíno)
- inca (Quechua inka)
- ixtle (Nahuatl)

=== J ===
- jacal
- jaguar (Guaraní)
- Jamaica (Taíno)
- jíbaro
- jícama (Nahuatl xikámatl)
- jícara
- jitomate
- jobo

=== L ===
- llama (Quechua)
- lempira
- loro

=== M ===
- mabí, maví (Taíno)
- macana (Taíno)
- macanudo
- maguey (Taíno)
- maiz (Taíno)
- mamey (Taíno)
- manatí (Taíno)
- mandioca (Nheengatu/Guaraní manio'k / mandio)
- mangle (Taíno)
- maní
- mapache (Nahuatl mapachtli)
- maraca
- maracuyá
- mate ('drink')
- maya
- mecate (Nahuatl mekatl)
- mesquite (Nāhuatl mizquitl)
- mico (Cumanagoto language)
- milpa (Nahuatl milpan)
- mixteco (Nahuatl mixtekatl)
- mole ('sauce', Nahuatl molli)
- morocho (Quechua muruch'u)

=== N ===
- náhuatl
- nana (Quechua ñaña)
- nigua
- nopal (Nahuatl nopalli)

=== Ñ ===
- ñandú
- ñapa, yapa (Quechua)

=== O ===
- ocelote (Nahuatl ocelotl)
- ocote (Nahuatl okotl)
- ojota (Quechua ushuta)
- olmeca (Nahuatl olmekatl)

=== P ===
- palta (Quechua)
- pampa (Quechua)
- papa (Quechua)
- papaya (Taíno)
- pécari
- petaca
- petate
- pinole
- pita (Quechua)
- popote (Nahuatl, popotl)
- poroto (Quechua purutu)
- poto (Quechua putu)
- pozole (Nahuatl, pozolli)
- pulque (Classical Nahuatl poliuhqui octli)
- puma (Quechua puma)
- pupo (Quechua pupu)

=== Q ===
- quechua (Quechua qhichwa)
- quena (Quechua)
- quetzal (Nahuatl)
- quiltro
- quincha (Quechua qincha)
- quina (Quechua kinakina)
- quinua, quinoa (Quechua kinwa)
- quipu (Quechua khipu)
- quisqueyano

=== S ===
- sabana (Taíno)
- sonsote, cenzotle
- soroche (Quechua suruchiq)

=== T ===
- tacho (Quechua tachu)
- tamal (Nahuatl tamalli)
- tamanduá (Tupí probably from taixi mondé ant-eater)
- tambo (Quechua tampu)
- tapioca
- tarahumara
- tepehuán (Nahuatl Tēpēhuanih, Tepēhuāntin, Tēpēhuanitlahtōlli, and/or Tepēhuahcān)
- tequila (Tecuilah)
- tiburón (Taíno)
- tiza (Nahuatl, tizatl)
- tomate (Nahuatl tómatl)
- tucán
- tuna
- tuza (Nahuatl)

=== V ===
- vicuña (Quechua wik'uña)
- vizcacha (Quechua wisk'acha)

=== W ===
- wincha (Quechua wincha')

=== Y ===
- yuca
- yuyo (Quechua yuyu)

=== Z ===
- zacate (Nahuatl zakatl)
- zapallo (Quechua sapallu)
- zapote (Nahuatl zapotl)
- zapoteca (Nahuatl zapotekatl)
- zopilote (Nahuatl zopilotl)

== List by language of origin ==
=== Arawakan ===
Iguana Cocoa Barbecue Hurricane Hammock Savannah Tobacco Papaya Canoe Potato Jamaica Guava

=== Aymara ===
- china= feminine form of chino, see chino below
- chino= a person indigenous to the Americas, a mestizo, a servant: from Aymara (or Quechua) china "female animal, servant"

=== Carib ===
- arepa = a typical maize bread; a pancake, a thin cake, fried or roasted made of maize flour (from Carib arepa)
- canoa = a typical dugout canoe made by the native Amerindians (from Carib kanawa)
- curiara = a typical dugout canoe made by the native Amerindians (from Carib kurijara)

=== Mayan ===
chuco = adv (comp)

=== Quechua ===
Quechuan /ˈkɛtʃwən/, also known as runa simi ("people's language"), is a Native South American language family spoken primarily in the Andes, derived from a common ancestral language. It is the most widely spoken language family of the indigenous peoples of the Americas, with a total of probably some 8 million to 10 million speakers

=== Taíno ===
- canoa = a typical dugout canoe made by the native Amerindians (from Taíno canowa)

=== Tupi–Guarani languages ===
- Guarani language: ñandú, ananá, guaraná, tatú, cajú, yacaré.
- Nheengatu language: tapioca (< typyʼók-a), jaguar (< jawár-a), mandioca (< maniʼók-a), tucán (< tukán-a) o tapir (< tapiʼír-a).

=== Yaqui ===
- buqui = boy/child
- bichi = nude

== See also ==
- List of Spanish words of Nahuatl origin
- List of English words of Spanish origin
- Linguistic history of Spanish
