= List of Spanish words of uncertain origin =

This is a list of Spanish words of uncertain origin. Some of these words existed in Latin and/or Ancient Greek, but are thought by some scholars to ultimately come from some other source. Many of these words have alternate etymologies and may also appear on a list of Spanish words from a different language.

== A ==
- ademán
- agachar
- agalla
- ají
- amargo
- anchoa
- añicos
- Apache
- ardilla
- areito
- arete
- aro
- arrancar
- arrear
- arriero
- arveja/alverja
- asustar

== B ==
- balde (barrel, tub)
- barato
- barraca
- barro
- bata
- baúl
- beso
- bisagra
- bizco
- borrar
- borrego
- bronce
- bruja
- buitre
- burla
- burlar
- buscar

== C ==
- cabaña,
- cacarear
- caleta
- cama
- cambur
- camilla
- canica
- caracol
- carcajada
- catalán
- cataluña
- cebra
- celta
- cagarra
- changa
- chango
- charco
- chileno
- chipre
- chiste
- chorro
- chupar
- cibernética
- coco
- cochino,
- cucubano

== D ==
- danza
- derrocar
- destrozar

== E ==
- -ez (name suffix)

== G ==
- gabacho
- gacho
- gago
- gana
- ganga
- garbanzo
- garza
- gobernar
- godo
- gorra
- gorrión
- gorro
- gótico
- graznar
- gusano,

== H ==
- hipo

== J ==
- judía (lima bean)
- juey

== L ==
- lama
- latir
- laurel
- leopardo
- lerdo
- lirio water lily
- liso
- listo

== M ==
- malgache
- malva
- manteca
- mantecado
- mantequilla
- mascota
- maullar
- metralla
- mimo
- mimar
- mohíno
- moho
- moneda
- moño
- mueca
- migir

== N ==
- nabo
- niña

== O ==
- ola
- olivo
- -ón= augmentative suffix (opposite of a diminutive suffix), as found in balón "big ball.": the same as Italian -one. Examples: guitarrón (from guitarra), salchichón (from salchicha). Exceptions (nouns ending in -ón that are not in the augmentative): aguijón, camarón, empujón.

== P ==
- pantano
- pantalla
- pantera
- parra
- parrilla
- pata
- patán
- patear
- patillas
- patín
- patio
- pato
- patrulla
- pavana
- pelícano
- peluca
- pequeño
- pera
- pito
- porrazo
- prado

== S ==
- sabotear
- saeta
- salpicar
- salsifí
- senda
- sendero
- sodio
- soga
- sucre
- susto

== T ==
- titere
- tonto
- topar
- tope
- trenza
- trocar
- tropa
- tropel
- troza
- truco

== Z ==
- zángano
- zapato

== See also ==
- Linguistic history of Spanish
- List of English words of Spanish origin
