= List of French words of Germanic origin (H–Z) =

This List of French words of Germanic origin is a dictionary of Standard Modern French words and phrases deriving from any Germanic language of any period, whether incorporated in the formation of the French language or borrowed at any time thereafter.

== Scope of the dictionary ==
The following list details words, affixes and phrases that contain Germanic etymons. Words where only an affix is Germanic (e.g. méfait, bouillard, carnavalesque) are excluded, as are words borrowed from a Germanic language where the origin is other than Germanic (for instance, cabaret is from Dutch, but the Dutch word is ultimately from Latin/Greek, so it is omitted). Likewise, words which have been calqued from a Germanic tongue (e.g. pardonner, bienvenue, entreprendre, toujours, compagnon, plupart, manuscrit, manoeuvre), or which received their usage or sense (i.e. were created, modified or influenced) due to Germanic speakers or Germanic linguistic habits (e.g. comté, avec, commun, on, panne, avoir, ça) are not included.

Many other Germanic words found in older versions of French, such as Old French and Anglo-French are no longer extant in Standard Modern French. Many of these words do, however, continue to survive dialectally and in English. See: List of English Latinates of Germanic origin.

== H ==
- hache "hachet"
  hachette
  hachereau
  hacher
  hachoir
  hachure
  hachis
- hachure "hatching"
- hagard "haggard, wild"
- haie "hedge"
- haillon "rag, tatters"
- haine "hatred"
  haineux
- haïr "to hate"
  haine
  haïssable
- haire "hair-shirt"
- halbran (Zoo.) "duckling"
  halbrené
- hâle "swarthy, sunburnt"
- haler "to haul"
  halage
  haleur
  halin
- hâler "to dry up, to sunburn"
  hâle
  hâloir
- halle "market"
  hallage
- hallebarde "halberd"
  hallebardier
- hallier "thicket" ( < ML hasla < *Frk hasal < Gmc, cf OHG hasala, MDu hasel)
- halte "halt"
  halt
- hameau "hamlet"
- hampe "handle, staff"
- hanap "goblet"
- hanche "hip, haunch"
  déhanché
  éhanché
- hanbane "henbane"
- hangar "shed, hangar" ( < MFr hanghart < Frk *haimgard < haim "home" < Gmc, cf OE hām + gard "protection, shelter, yard" < Gmc, cf OE ġeard)
- hanneton "beetle"
- Hanse "the Hanse"
  Hanséatique
- hanter "to frequent, haunt"
  hantise
- happe "bed of an axle-tree"
  happe-chair
  happe-foie
  happe-lapin
- happer "to snap"
- haquenée "hackney, nag"
- haquet "a dray"
  haquetier
- harangue "harangue"
  haranguer
- haras "stud" ( < haraz < ON hārr < Gmc)
- harasser "to harass" ( < MFr harasser < OFr harrier "to harry" & harer < Frk *hara "here!" < Gmc, cf OHG hera, MDu hare)
- harceler "to harass, torment"
- hard "hardware"
  hardeau
  hardelée
- harde "herd"
  harder
  déharder
- harde "leash"
- hardes "clothes" ( < harde < Gmc, infl in meaning by unrelated fardes)
- hardi "bold"
  hardiesse
  enhardir
  hardiment
- hardiesse "boldness"
- hareng "herring"
  harengère
  harengerie
- hargne "aggressive" ( < OFr hargner < Frk *harmjan "to insult, harm" < Gmc, cf OHG harmjan to scold, quarrel", OE hearm "harm")
  hargner
  hargneux
- haricot "bean"
- haridelle "jade, harridan" ( < haras " < Gmc + -idelle)
- harnacher "to harness"
  enharnacher
- harnais "harness" ( < OFr harneis, hernais < ON hernest "army supplies" < herr "army" < Gmc + nest "provisions" < Gmc, cf OE here "army")
  harnacher
- haro "hue and cry"
- harpe "harp"
  harpiste
- harper "to grip" ( < Frk *harpan "to seize" < Gmc, cf OHG harfan "to seize", OE hreppan "to touch", ON harpa "cramp")
  harpe
  harpon
  harpin
  harpigner
- harpon "harpoon"
  harponner
  harponneur
- hart "cord, rope"
  harde
- hase "female hare"
- hast "staff" ( < OFr haste "lance, roasting spit" < Lat hasta < Frk *harst "grill" < Gmc, cf OHG harst "roast", Dut harsten "to roast")
  hâtelet
  hâtelettes
  hâtereau
  hâtrier
  hâteur
- hâte "haste"
  hâter
  hâtif
- hâtier "spit-rest"
- hâtif "hasty, forward"
  hâtiveté
  hâtiveau
- hauban (Naut.) "stay, shroud"
  haubaner
- haubert "hauberk" ( < OFr hauberc, halberc < Frk *halsberg < Gmc, cf MHG halsberc)
  haubergeon
- haut "high" ( < OFr haut, halt conflation of Lat altus and Frk *hauh < Gmc, cf OE hēah "high")
  hautain
  hautesse
  hauteur
- hautain "haughty"
- hautbois "hautbois"
- hautesse (title) "highness"
- hauteur "height, haughtiness"
- hâve "pale, wan" ( < Frk *haswa- "pale, grey" < Gmc, cf MHG heswe "pallid", OE hasu, haswa "grey, ashen")
  havir
- haver "to cut" ( < Dial Fr (Walloon) < Frk *hauwan "to cut"; *hauwa "hoe, cutting implement" < Gmc, cf OHG houwen "to cut, hew", OE hēawan "to cut, hew")
- averon "wild oats" ( < OHG habaro < Gmc)
- havre "harbour"
- havresac "knapsack" ( < havre-sac "oat-bag" < Germ Habersack < Gmc)
- heaume "helm"
- héberger "to harbour, lodge"
  héberge
  hébergement
  hébergeur
- héler "to hail" ( < ME heilen "to hail" < ON heill "health" < Gmc)
- hellequin "will-o-the-wisp"
- héraldique "heraldic"
- héraut "herald"
- hère "fellow, wretch" ( < Germ Herr or Dut heer < Gmc, cf OE hearra "lord")
- hère "young stag" ( < Dut hert < Gmc, cf Eng hart)
- hermine "ermine" ( < OFr hermine < Frk *harmo, harmin- "ermine, weasel" < Gmc, cf OHG harmo, harmin "weasel, ermine, stoat", OS harmo, OE hearma"ermine")
  herminé
- héron "heron"
  héronneau
  héronnier
  héronnière
- hêtre "beech-tree"
- heurter "to strike" ( < OFr hurter "to knock into" < Frk *hūrtan "to ram into" < *hūrt < Gmc, cf MHG hurten "to collide with, run into", ON hrūtr "ram")
  heurt
  heurtoir
  heurtement
  s'aheurter
- hie "a tamper, a paviour's ram"
- hisser "to hoist"
- hobereau (Zoo.) "a hobby falcon"
- hochqueue (Zoo.) "a wagtail"
- hocher "to shake"
  hoche
  hochet
- hochet "a child's rattle"
- homard "lobster"
- honnir "to dishonour"
- honte "shame"
- honteux
- éhonté
- honteux "ashamed"
- hoque "small coat"
- hoquet "hiccup"
- hotte "basket"
- houblon "hop"
  houblonner
  houblonnière
- houe "hoe"
- houille "coal" ( < Walloon hoie < Lat hullae < Frk *hukila "heap, mound" < hukk- < Gmc, cf Dut Dial heukel, MDu hokke, Germ Hocke)
  houiller
  houilleur
  houillère
- houle "billow" ( < Norm houle "cavity, rabbit hole" < ON hol "hole" < Gmc, cf OE hol "cave")
  houleux
- houle "brothel" ( < OHG holi "hole" < Gmc, infl by OFr hore "whore" < Gmc)
  houlière
- houlette "trowel, crook" ( < MFr hollette "shepherd's staff" < houler "to throw" < Frk *hollan < Gmc, cf MDu hollen "to run headlong")
- houppe (Zoo.) "a tuft, topknot"
- houppelande "overcoat"
- hourder "to roughcast"
- houseau "spatterdash"
- houspiller "to nag, worry, mob" ( < Norm gouspiller < a Gmc compound represented by OE hosp "injury, insult" + OE spillan "to waste, destroy", cf OE ūtspillan "to abuse, mistreat")
- housse "horse-cloth, housing"
- houssine "a switch"
- houssoir "a birch-broom"
- houx (Bot.) "holm oak, holly tree"
- hoyau "pickaxe, mattock"
- huche "bin" ( < OFr huche, huge < LL hutica < Gmc, cf OE hwicce "hutch")
- hucher "to whistle" ( < OFr huchier "to cry, shout" < LL huccare < Gmc *hukk-, cf MDu huuc "a shout")
  huchet
- hucher "to perch" ( < Frk *hūkōn "to squat" < Gmc, cf MHG hūcken, Dut huiken, Germ hocken "to squat")
- huchet "hunting-horn"
- huguenot "huguenot" ( < Swiss Germ Eidgenosse < Eid < OHG eit "oath" < Gmc + Genosse < OHG ginōz "comrade" < Gmc, cf OE āþ "oath", OE ġenēat "comrade, companion")
  huguenotisme
- hune (Naut.) "top"
  hunier
- huppe (Zoo.) "tuft, crest" ( < LL upupa < Gmc, cf ODu hoppe, huppe, LG huppup)
  huppé
- huppé "crested"
- hure "head"
- hurluberlu "a fool"
- hutin "sharp"
- hutte "hut"
  hutter
- huve "a type of old-fashioned haistyle"

== I ==
- ice-boat
- ice-cream
- ice-field
- iceberg "iceberg"
- if (Bot.) "yew" ( < OFr iv, ivo < Frk *îwa < Gmc īwo-, īwa-, cf OHG īwa, OE īw "yew")
- inlay "inlay"
- input (Tech.) "input"
- insaissable "imperceptible"
  insaissablilité
- installer "to install" ( < MFr < ML installare < in- + stallum < Gmc, cf OE steall "place, stall")
  installation
  installé
  installeur
- interbancaire "interbank"
- interbande "space between bands"
- intergroupe
  intergroupal
- intra-groupe
- ive (Bot.) "yew"
  ivette
- interlope "an interloper" ( < Eng interlope < interloper < inter- + loper < MDu lōper "runner" < lōpen "to run" < Gmc, cf OE hlēapan "to leap, run")

== J ==
- jable "cross-groove, gable"
  jabler
- japper "to yelp, bark" (< OFr japer, OPr jaupar < Gmc *galpōn "to yelp, bark, scream")
  jappe
  jappement
- jardin "garden" ( < OFr < Frk *gardo, gardin- "yard" < Gmc, cf OE ġeard "yard")
  jardiner
  jardinier
  jardinage
  jardinet
- jars "male goose, gander" ( < Frk *gard "spine, rod, pivot" < Gmc)
- jaser "to chatter, prattle" ( < ON gassi "prattler" < Gmc)
  jaseur
  jaserie
- jauger "to gauge" ( < OFr jauge, gauge < Frk *galga, galgo "measuring rod, pole" < Gmc, cf OE gealga "gallows")
  jauge
  jaugeage
- javeline "javelin"
- javelot "a javelin"
- job "job"
- jockey "jockey"
- joli "pretty"
  joliet
  enjoliver
  joliveté
  joliment
- jucher "to perch, roost"
  juchoir
  déjucher

== K ==
- K.O. "K.O., knockout"
- kart "go-cart"
- karting "carting"
- keepsake "keepsake, souvenir"
- kermesse "kirk-mass" ( < Flem kerkmisse)
- kick
- kick-starter
- kidnapper "to kidnap"
  kidnappage
  kidnappeur
  kidnappeuse
  kidnapping
- kieselguhr
- king-charles
- kirsch-wasser (also kirschwasser) "kirsch-wasser" ( < Germ < Gmc)
- kit
- kitsch
- knickerbockers
- knickers
- knock-down
- knock-out
  knock-outer
- knout
  knouter
- kobold "cobalt"
- krach
- krack
- kraft
- kraken "kraken"
- kriegspiel

== L ==
- laîche "sedge"
- laid "ugly"
  laideron
  laideur
  enlaidir
- laie "a female pig, sow"
- laie "path" ( < ML leda < Frk *laid- < Gmc, cf ON leid "way, lode", OE lād "course, path")
- laisse
  laisses
- laisser "to leave, let" ( OFr lesser, laisier < LL lassare "to let, let go, leave", partly from L laxare "to loosen"; partly from OHG lāzzan, lāzan "to let, let go, leave"; cf OE lǣtan "to let, leave, rent"; also from OFr laiier "to leave" < Frk *lagjan "to lay")
  laisse
  laissé-courre
  laissé-pour-compte
  laissées
  laisser-aller
  laisser-courir
  laisser-courre
  laisser-faire
  laisser-passer
  laisses
  laissez-aller
  laissez-faire
  laissez-passer
- lamaneur "pilot" ( < OFr laman, lomant < MDu lootsman < Gmc)
- lambeau "scrap"
- lambel "scrap, shred"
- lambourde "tie bar, joist"
- lambrequin (Archit.) "a scallop"
- lampas "lampas"
- lamper "to guzzle"
  lampée
- lande "waste land, heath"
- lansquenet "lansquenet" ( < Germ Landsknecht "lands-knight" < Gmc)
- laper "to lap"
- lapereau "bunny rabbit" ( < lapriel < lap-, probably of Gmc origin, cf Frk *hlaupan "to run, jump", OE hlēapan "to leap, jump, run")
- lapin "rabbit"
- last "a last, weight"
- latte "lath"
  latter
  lattis
- layer "to mark wood, bush-hammer"
  layeur
- layette "thin layer, baby linen"
  layetier
- lèche "thin slice"
  lèchefrite
- lécher "to lick"
  léchard
  lécheur
  léchonner
  léchefroie
- lège (Naut.) "light in weight or occupancy"
- lest "ballast"
  lester
- leste "brisk"
- lester "to ballast"
  lesteur
  lestage
- let (tennis term < Eng let < Gmc)
- Lètes "Laeti"
- leude "a leud"
- leurre "a lure, decoy"
  leurrer
- lice "lists, tiltyard"
- lie "dregs, lye of wine"
- lige "liege"
- lingot "ingot"
  lingotière
- lippe "lip, pout"
  lippée
  lippu
- lippée "a mouthful, a meal"
- lippu "thick-lipped"
- liseré "edging, bordering, trim"
- lisière "edge"
  liseré
- liste "list"
  lisière
  listeau
  liteau
  liston
  listel
- listeau "blue strap"
  liteau
- liston "scroll"
- liteau "a blue stripe"
- litre "a black band"
- living "living room, sitting room, parlour" ( < Eng < Gmc)
- loch "a ship's log"
- locher "to be loose"
- locman "a harbour pilot"
- lof "luff"
- loge "lodge, lobby"
  loger
  logis
  logement
  logette
  logeable
- loger "to lodge"
- logeur
- déloger
- logis "a dwelling"
- lombes "loins" ( < Lat lumbus < Gmc *lundiz, landwin-, cf ON, lund, Frk *lendin "loins", OHG lentin, OE lendenu "loins" )
  lombaire
- lopin "bit, piece"
- loque "rag"
- loquet "locket"
- lorgner "to ogle"
  lorgnon
  lorgnette
  lorgneur
- losange "lozenge" ( < OFr losenge < Frk *lausinga "flattery, fraud" < Gmc, cf OE lēasung "leasing")
- lot "lot, portion"
  lotir
  loterie
- loterie "lottery"
- lotir "to lot, apportion"
  loti
  lotissement
- loto "loto"
- louche "large spoon"
- louchet "grafting tool"
- louis (Monet.) "a louis"
- loup-garou "werewolf"
- loupe "magnifier, magnifying glass"
- loure "a loure (dance)"
- loutre "otter"
- louvoyer "to tack"
- lover "to coil"
- lubie "whim"
- lucarne
- lumbago "lumbago"
- luron "jolly fellow"
  luronne
- lutin "a little one, elf, goblin"
  lutiner

== M ==
- mâche "mash" ( < Gmc *maisk, cf Germ Maisch, OE māx "mash")
- mâcher "to beat, strike, smash" ( < Gmc, cf Germ matschen "to crush, smash")
  mâcheur
- mâchurer "to blacken"
- macle (Bot.) "caltrop"
- macle (Min.) "macle; twin"
- macler "to twin"
- maçon "mason"
  maçonner
  maçonnage
  maçonnique
  franc-maçon
  maçonnerie
- macreuse (Zoo.) "black-diver"
- madré "speckled"
- magot "bags" ( < OFr mugot "hidden treasure" < musgot, musgode, musjoe < Gmc *musgauda)
- maint "many" ( < Gmc *manigiþō "a multitude, great quantity", cf MDu menichte "crowd, great number", OE menigþu)
- malart "drake, mallard"
- malle "a trunk"
  malle-poste
  mallier
- malt "malt"
- mandrin "chuck, mandrel" ( < Prov mandre < Gmc, cf Goth *manduls, ON mondull, MHG mandel)
- manne "hamper, basket" ( < Pic mande < Dut mand, mande < Gmc, cf OE mand "basket")
- mannequin "mannequin" ( < Dut manneken "little man" < man "man" < Gmc + -ken "-kin" < Gmc)
- maquereau (Zoo.) "mackerel"
- maquereau "brothel-keeper"
  maquerelle
  maquereauter
  maquereller
- maquiller "to make up" ( < OFr makier "to make, do, work" < MDu maken "to make" < Gmc, cf OE macian "to make")
  maquillage
- maquignon "horse-dealer"
  maquignonnage
- maraîcher "a kitchen gardener"
- marais "marsh; kitchen garden"
- maraud "knave, rascal" ( < OFr marault "beggar, vagabond" < OFr marir "to lose one's way" < OHG marrjan "to obstruct" < Gmc + -wald, -walt suffix < Gmc)
  marauder
- marauder "to maraud"
  maraude
  maraudeur
- marc "mark"
- marc "dregs, residue"
- marcassin "a young boar"
- marche "march, military frontier"
- marche "march, walk"
- marchepied "a step-stair"
- marcher "to march, walk" ( < OFr marchier "to tread, move" < Frk *markōn "to mark, pace out" < Gmc)
  marche
  marcheur
  démarche
- mare "pool, pond" ( < ON marr "sea, lake, pond" or Dut maer, maar "pond, lake, pool" < Gmc, cf OS meri "pond, pool", OHG meri "inland sea", OE mere "mere, pool, pond")
  marée
- marécage "marsh"
  marécageux
- maréchal "mareschal, marshal"
  maréchalerie
- maréchaussée "troop commanded by a mareschal"
- marmonner "to murmur" ( < ON < Gmc, cf Nor marma, Swed marra "to murmur", Germ murren, murmeln)
- marmotter "to mumble, mutter"
  marmotte
- maroufle "lining paste"
- marque "mark"
  marquer
  marquant
- marquer "to mark"
  marqueur
  remarqueur
  démarqueur
- marqueter "to chequer"
  marqueterie
- marquis "marquis"
  marquise
  marquisat
- marri "sad" ( < OFr marrir "to sadden" < Frk *marrjan < Gmc, cf OE mierran)
- marsouin (Zoo.) "porpoise" ( < ON marsvin < Gmc, cf OHG meri-suīn "mere-swine", Dut meerswijn)
- mash
- masque "mask"
  mascara
  mascarade
  mascaron
  masquant
  masquante
  masquer
- masquer
  masquage
  masqué
- massacrer "to massacre" ( < LL massacrium < Frk *matsekern < Gmc, cf LG matsken "to slaughter, massacre", Germ metzgern "to butcher")
  massacre
  massacreur
- mat "dull, heavy"
  matir
  matité
  matoir
  matte
  matité
- mât (Naut.) "mast"
  mâter
  démâter
  mâture
  mâtereau
- matelot "sailor" ( < Dut mattenoot < Gmc)
  matelote
- matir (Metal.) "to dull, deaden"
- matois "swindler, gangster" ( < mate "place appointed for robbers" < Germ Matte < Gmc, cf Eng meadow)
  matoiserie
- mâture "masts; wood for masts"
- mauvais "bad" ( < OFr malvais < *malvasi < Frk *balvasi "bad, malicious" < Gmc, cf OHG balvasi "bad, malicious", Goth balvavesei "spite, maliciousness", Icel bölv-, OE bealu, bealw- "bale, wicked, malicious". Influenced in form by Lat malus "bad, evil")
- mazette "bad horse; useless person" ( < Germ matz "awkward")
- mé- "mis-"
- mégarde "inadvertence"
- mégissier "leather-dresser" ( < OFr mégis < Gmc, cf Dut meuk "softening", ON mjūkr "soft")
  mégisserie
  mégir
  mégie
- méringue "meringue" ( < MDu meringue "collation of the evening" < Gmc, cf MHG merunge < mëren "to soak bread in wine or water for dinner", MLG meringe < mern "to soak bread in wine or water for dinner")
  méringuer
- merlan (Zoo.) "whiting"
- merlin "marline" ( < Eng < Gmc)
- més- "mis-"
- mésange "titmouse"
- meurtre "murder" ( OFr murdre < L mordrum "murder" < Frk *murþar "murder" < Gmc, cf OHG murdrjan, murdjan "to murder", OE morþor "murder", Goth maurþr "murder")
  meurtrier
  meurtrir
  meurtrière
- meurtrir "to kill, bruise"
  meurtrissure
- miche "loaf"
- micmac "an intrigue"
- mièvre "roguish" ( <esmievre "hastened" < ON snæfr "fast, nimble" < Gmc)
  mièvrerie
  mièvreté
- mignard "delicate"
  mignarder
  mignardise
- mignon "favourite, darling, minion" ( < OFr mign- < Gmc, cf OHG minnia "darling")
  mignonette
  mignonoter
- mijaurée "a conceited woman"
- mijoter "to cook gently and slowly, simmer"
- milord "lord, wealthy man"
- mitaine "mitten" ( < OFr mitaine "mitten, half-glove," from OFr mite "mitten" < ML mitta < MHG mittemo "half-glove" < OHG mittamo "middle, midmost")
- mite "tick, mite"
- miton "mitten"
- mitonner "to coddle"
- mitraille "grapeshot, old iron"
  mitrailler
  mitraillade
- moche ( < Frk *mokka "formless mass" < Gmc, cf Germ Mocke)
- momerie "masquerade, mummery" ( < OFr momer < Gmc, cf OHG mummen, MDu mommen "to act a mummer")
- moquer "to mock" ( < Picard moquer < MDu mocken "to mumble" < Gmc, cf MLG mucken "to grumble")
  moquerie
  moqueur
- morille (Bot.) "morel"
- morne "downcast, dull"
- motte "clod, mound"
- moue "pout"
- mouette "seagull, mew"
- moufle "glove, muffler"
- moufle (Chem.) "muffle"; system of pulleys"
- mouron (Bot.) "pimpernel"
- mousse "blunt"
  émousser
- mousse (Bot.) "moss"; "foam, mousse"
  mousser
- mousser "to foam"
  moussoir
  moussu
  mousseux
- mousseron "mushroom"
- mufle "snout, muzzle"
  muflier
- mulot "fieldmouse"
- musard "trifler; loitering"
- museau "muzzle"
- museler "to muzzle"
  muselière
  emmuseler
- muser "to dawdle"
  musard
  amuser
- musser "to hide"

== N ==
- nabot "dwarf" ( < OFr nimbot < ON nabbi "bump, knot" < Gmc)
- naguère "lately"
- nantir "to pledge, secure, take possession of"
  nantissement
- navrer "to wound"
  navrance
  navrant
  navré
  navrement
  navrure
- niche "prank, trick"
- nickel "nickel"
- nigaud "dunce" ( < OFr *nigald, niguald < Frk *niwald "newby, novice" < *niwi "new" + -wald, cf OHG niwi, niuwi "novice, beginner")
  nigauder
  nigauderie
- nippe "clothes"
  nipper
- nique "a mocking gesture" ( < ON < Gmc, cf Swed nyck "trick")
  niquer
  niquedouille
- nope "small knot"
- nord "north"
  nordique
- Normand "Norman"
  Normandie
- noue "gutter-lead"
- nouille "noodle"
- nuque "nape of the neck"

== O ==
- O.K. "O.K."
- off "Off-Broadway"
- off-shore (also offshore) "offshore"
- offset "paper used in offset printing processes"
- oflag "camp where captive officers in Germany were held during WWII"
- ohé (Interj.) "hey!, halt!"
- ohm "ohm"
  ohmique
- -ois adjective suffix ( < LL -iscus < Frk *-isk < Gmc, cf OE -isc "-ish")
  -oise
- one woman show "one woman show"
- one-man show "one man show"
- one-step (Dance) "one-step"
- onlay (Dent.) "onlay"
- -ons (first person plural indicative ending of verbs, e.g. nous mangeons) ( < OFr -omes, -umes < Frk *-omês, -umês; cf OHG -omēs, -umēs)
- open (Sports) "open, sporting event"
- openfield "open field"
- orgueil "pride"
  orgueilleux
  s'orgueillir
- osier "wicker"
- ouate "pads, waddling" ( < ML wadda < Gmc, cf Du watte, ON vað "cloth", Swed vadd, Eng wad)
  ouater
  ouaté
  ouateux
  ouatine
- ouatine "quilt"
  ouatiner
- ouest "west" ( < ME west < OE west < Gmc)
  ouest-africain
  ouest-allemand
  ouest-allemande
  ouest-européen
  ouest-indien
  ouest-sud-ouest
- out (Sports) "an out"
- outlaw "outlaw"
- output (Tech.) "output"
- oxford "oxford"

== P ==
- pacotille "business venture; stock of goods"
- paletot "large coat, cardigan"
  paletoquet
- papelard "hypocrite"
- paquet "packet"
  paqueter
  empaqueter
- parc "park" ( < OFr < ML *parricus < Frk *parruk < Gmc, cf OHG pfarrih "fencing, enclosure", OE pearruc "enclosure, park, paddock", Dut park "park")
  parquer
  parquet
  parcage
  emparquer
- parquer "to pen"
- parquet "parquet floor"
  parqueter
  parqueteur
  parqueterie
  parquetage
- pataud "lump; young dog"
- patauger "to splash, dabble"
  patouiller
- patin "skate"
  patiner
  patineur
- patois "patois" ( lit. "clumsy speech" < OFr patoier "to handle clumsily" < pate "paw" < LL patta, pauta < Gmc, cf Germ Pfote "paw", LG pote, Dut poot "paw")
- patte "paw"
  pataud
  patauger
  patin
- pec "newly salted"
- pic "pike, pickax"
  picot
- picoter "to pick"
  picotin
  picotement
  picoterie
- picotin "peck of oats"
- pincer "to pinch" ( < Wal pissi < Ven pizzare < Gmc, cf Dut pitsen, Germ pfetzen, pfitzen)
  pince
  pincée
  pinçon
- pincette "tweezers"
- pingouin "penguin" ( < Eng)
- pinte "pint"
- pioche "picaxe"
  piocher
- pique-nique "pic-nic" ( < Eng)
- piquer "to prick"
  pique
  piquant
  piquier
  piquette
  piqueur
  piqûre
  picoter
  piquet
- piquet "piquet (card game)"
- pistole "pistole"
- pistolet "pistol"
- pivert (Zoo.) "the green woodpecker"
- placage "metal plating"
- placard "placard"
  placarder
- plafond "ceiling" ( < plat "flat" < Gmc + fond "bottom")
- plaque (Metal.) "plate"
  plaquer
  plaqué
  plaquette
  plaqueur
  placage
  placard
- plat "flat" ( < OFr < LL *plattus < Gmc, cf Germ platt "flat", OE plot "plot, piece of ground")
  platée
  aplatir
  platitude
  plat-bord
  plate-forme
  plate-bande
  plafond
- plateau "tray, plateau"
- platine "plate"
- platine (Metal.) "platina"
- pleige "pledge"
  pleiger
- pleutre "coward" ( < Flem pleute "rascal, good-for-nothing" < Gmc)
- ploc (Naut.) "sheathing-hair"
- poche "pocket"
  empocher
  pocher
  pochade
  pochette
  pocheter
- poltron "coward" ( < Ital poltrone < poltro "lazy" < OHG polstar "cushion" < Gmc, cf OE bolster "bolster, cushion")
  poltronnerie
- pompe "pump"
  pompier
  pomper
- pompe "pump (shoe)"
- pot "pot"
  potier
  potage
  potée
  potiche
  empoter
- pot "hole in the ground"
- potage "soup"
  potager
  potagère
- potasse (Chem.) "potash" ( < Germ Pottasche or Eng potash < pot + ash < Gmc)
  potassium
- pote "pal; large-handed"
  potelé
- potelé "plump"
- poterie "pottery"
- potier "a potter"
  poterie
- potin "pewter; gossip"
- potiron "pumpkin"
- poudingue "pudding"
- pouf "to puff"
  poufier
- poulie "pulley" ( < Gmc, cf OE pullian "to pull")
- prame (Naut.) "pram"
- punch "a punch" ( < Eng < Gmc)

== Q ==
- Quaker "a Quaker" ( < Eng < Gmc)
- quartz "quartz" ( < Germ Quarz)
  quartzeux
- quenotte "a child's tooth, baby-tooth" ( < OFr quenne < ON kenna < Gmc, cf Icel kenna)
- quiche "quiche" ( < Germ Küche "little cake" < Kuchen "cake" < Gmc)
- quille "keel" ( < ON kilir, pl of kjǫlr "keel" < Gmc, cf OE ċēol "ship")
  quillage
- quille "skittle" ( < MHG kegel < OHG kegil "stake, post" < Gmc, cf OE cǣġ "key")
  quillier
  quiller
  quilleter
- -quin adjective suffix
- quinquin "small child" ( < Flem kinken < kind "child" < Gmc + -ken "-kin" < Gmc)
- quincaille "ironmongery"
  quincaillier
  quincaillerie

== R ==
- rabâcher "to repeat over and over"
  rabâchage
  rabâcheur
- raboter "to plane"
  rabot
- rabougrir "to be stunted"
- rabrouer "to snub, scout"
- racaille "mob"
- raccrocher "to re-hook, hook again" ( < re- + Fr accrocher < Fr croc < ON krókr "hook" < Gmc)
  raccroc
- race "race, lineage" ( < It razza < Lomb raiza "line" < Gmc, cf OHG reiza "line")
  racer
- rade "road"; (Naval.) "roadstead" ( < ME rade, raid "road, journey" < OE rād < Gmc)
  rader
- rader "to travel"
  dérader
- radoter "to dote"
  radoteur
  radotage
  radoterie
- radoub "repair, refitting"
- radouber (Naut.) "to refit"
  radoub
- rafler "to carry off"
  rafle
- rafraîchir "to refresh, cool"
  rafraîchissant
  rafraîchissement
- ragaillardir "to cheer up"
- ragréer "to restore, finish"
- raguer (Naut.) "to chafe"
- râle (Med.) "a rattle"
- râler "to have a rattling in the throat"
  râle
  râlement
- ralingue "a bolt-rope"
  ralinguer
- ramequin "small cake with cheese"
- rampe "flight of stairs"
- ramper "to crawl"
  rampe
  rampant
  rampement
- ranche "wooden peg" ( < OFr < Frk *runka < hrunga "rung" < Gmc, infl by *hranka "vine shoot, gimlet" < Gmc, cf MDu ranke "branch")
- rancher "peg-ladder"
- randonner "to hike" ( < OFr randon < randir "to run" < rant "a run" < Frk *rand "a run" < Frk *rinnan "to run" < Gmc)
- rang "rank, row"
  ranger
  rangée
  déranger
  arranger
- ranz "ranz des vaches"
- râpe "a rasp, grater, grate"
- râpe "stalk (of grapes), stem"
- râper "to grate, rasp"
  râpe
- râpure "raspings"
- ras "fast ocean current" ( < ON rās "current, course, race" < Gmc)
- rat "rat"
  rate
  ratier
  ratière
  raton
  rater
- ratatiner "to shrivel up"
- rate "spleen, milt"
  ratelée
  rateleux
- rater "to misfire"
- ratine "cloth"
  ratiner
- raton "racoon"
- rattacher "to re-attach"
- rattraper "to recapture"
- rayon "honeycomb" ( < Frk *hrâta cf M.Dut "rata" )
- rebander "to retie, refasten"
- rebâtir "to rebuild"
- reblanchir "re-whiten"
- reborder "to re-edge, reborder"
- rebouteur "a bone-setter"
- reboutonner "to rebutton"
- rebrider "to rebridle"
- rebroder "to reimbroider"
- rebrousser "to turn back"
- rebuter "to repel"
  rebut
  rebutant
- receper "to cut down" ( < re- + cep "stock" < Lat cippus "stake, beam" < Gmc, cf OE cipp "beam, chip of wood", Dut kip "strip of wood")
  recepée
  recepage
- réche "rough"
  réchin
  réchigner
- réchigner "to look cross"
- recracher "to spit out again"
- redingote "frock-coat"
- refrapper "to strike again"
- regagner "to regain"
  regain
- regain "return"
- regain "aftermath"
- régal "treat, banquet"
- régaler "to regale"
  régal
  régalant
  régalement
- regarder "to look"
  regard
  regardant
- regarnir "to refurbish"
- regimber "to kick" ( < re- + gimber < gibier < Gmc)
- regratter "to re-scratch, rabate, bargain"
  regrat
  regrattier
  regratterie
- regretter "to regret"
  regret
  regrettable
- reître "rider, horseman" ( < Germ reiter < Gmc)
- relayer "to relieve" ( < re- + OFr layer "to stop, continue, leave" < LL latare < Gmc, cf Goth lātan)
- relai
- reluquer "to ogle" ( < re- + OFr luquier "to look" < M.Dut loeken )
- remarquer "to remark"
  remarque
  remarquable
- remballer "to repack"
- remblayer "to embank"
  remblai
- rembrunir "to darken"
  rembrunissement
- rempocher "to repocket"
- rempoter "to repot"
  rempotage
- renard "fox"
  renarde
  renardeau
  renardière
- rengager "to re-engage"
  rengagement
- renifler "to sniff at"
- renne "reindeer"
- reps "rep (fabric)" ( < Eng ribs < Gmc)
- requinquer "to spruce up"
- ressac "surf"
- ressaisir "to re-seize"
- retaper "to comb the wrong way"
- retirer "to remove, withdraw"
  retiré
  retirement
- retomber "to fall again"
  retombée
- retoucher "to retouch"
- retouche
- rêvasser "to dream, muse"
  rêvasseur
  rêvasserie
- rêve "dream" ( < rêver "to dream" < OFr resver "to consider, reflect, be delirious" < Frk *rēswan, rāswjan "to counsel, reason, suggest" < Gmc, cf OE rǣswan "to think, suppose, consider, suspect, conjecture, reflect")
- rêver
- revêche "harsh, sharp" ( < OFr ruvesche "savage, without pity" < Frk *hreubisck "hard, rough" < Gmc, cf ON hriūfr "rough")
- rêver "to dream"
- rêveur
- rêverie
- rhum "rum" ( < Eng rum)
- ribote "drunkenness, debauchery"
  riboter
  riboteur
- ricaner "to sneer" ( < rec(h)aner "to bray" < Norm cane "tooth" < Frk *kinni "jaw, chin" < Gmc, cf OHG chinni "chin", OE cinn "chin")
  ricanerie
  ricaneur
  ricanement
- richard "a married man"
- riche "rich" ( < OFr < Frk *rīki "rich" < Gmc, cf OHG rīhhi, OE rīċe)
  richesse
  richard
  richement
  enrichir
- richesse "riches"
- ricocher "to ricochet"
  ricochet
- ride "wrinkle"
- rideau "screen, curtain"
- ridelle "side-panel" ( < OFr "amount of wood on each side of a cart to keep the load" < MHG reidel "log" < Gmc, cf Germ Reitel)
- rider "to wrinkle"
  ride
- rigodon "rigadoon" ( < earlier rigaudon < Rigaud (personal name) < Gmc)
- rigole "a trench" ( < It rigoro < Gmc, cf OHG riga "line", LG rige "creek")
  rigoler
- rimailler "rhymster" ( < OFr rime < Frk *rīm < Gmc *rīma-n "number, series" + -aille, cf OHG rīm, OE rīm)
  rimailleur
- rime "rhyme" ( < OFr rime < Frk *rīm < Gmc *rīma-n "number, series", cf OHG rīm, OE rīm)
  rimer
- rimer "to rhime, rime"
  rimeur
  rimailler
- rincer "to rinse" ( < OFr raïncer, raïncier < ON hreinsa "to rinse, clean, wipe" < Gmc *hraina-z "clean, pure", cf Goth hrains "clean")
  rinçure
- ringard "poker, fuddy-duddy" ( < Wallon ringuèle "lever" < Germ (dial.) rengel "log")
- riolé "striped" ( < rigolé < rigole < OHG rīga "line" < Gmc)
- rioter "riot" ( < OFr rihoter, riotter < Gmc, cf Flem revot, ravot "to rub, excite", OHG rīban "to rub")
  rioteur
- ripaille "good cheer, feasting"
- riper "to scrape, drag"
- ripe
- ris "sweetbread" ( < rides (de veau) < ride < Gmc)
- rissoler "to roast brown"
  rissole
- river "to clench, rivet"
  rivet
  rivure
  rivoir
- rix-dale "rix-dollar" ( < Germ reichsthaler < Gmc)
- rob "a rubber" (of whist) ( < Eng rubber < Gmc)
- robe "dress"
- robin
- robinet "cock, tap"
- robinier "robinia"
- rochet "ratchet"
- rochet "garment worn under a mantle"
- rogue "proud" ( < ON hrōkr < Gmc)
- roquet "a pug (dog)"
- roquette "rocket" ( < It rocchetto "rocket, bobbin" < rocca "distaff, spindle" < Gmc *rukka-, cf Goth *rukka, OHG rocco "distaff", ON rokkr)
- rosbif "roastbeef" ( < Eng)
- roseau "a reed"
- rosse "a nag, poor horse"
- rosser "to thrash"
- rôt "roast"
- rôtir "to roast"
  rôt
  rôti
  rôtie
  rôtisserie
  rôtisseur
  rôtissoire
- rôtisseur "cookshop master"
- rouan "roan horse" ( < MFr roan < Sp roano < OSp raudano < Goth raudan, obj case of rauda "red one" < rauðs "red", cf OE rēad "red")
- rouf "cuddy"
- rouf "deckhouse" ( < Dut roef, cf Eng "roof" )
- rouffe "scabies"
- rouir "to ret"
  rouissage
  rouissoir
- roussin "a hack, stallion"
- rouvieux "mangy"
- ruban "ribbon"
  rubanerie
  rubanier
- rustine "rubber repair patch" ( < Germ Rück "back" + Stein "stone" )

== S ==
- sabord "port-hole"
- sabot "wooden shoe"
  saboter
  sabotier
  sabotière
- sabre "sabre"
  sabrer
  sabreur
- sabretache "sabretache"
- sac "plunder, sack"
  saquer
- saccade "shake, jerk"
- saccager "to pillage"
  saccage
  saccagement
- safre "greedy, gluttonous" ( < Gmc, cf OHG seifar "mouth-watering, salivating", Goth safjan "to savour, enjoy")
- saisie "legal execution"
- saisir "to seize" ( OFr < Lat sacire < Frk *sakjan "to claim" and *satjan "to place, establish", both < Gmc, cf OE sēcan "to seek" & OHG sazjan "to place")
  saisie
  saisine
  saisissable
  saisissant
  saisissement
- saisissable "seizable"
  insaisissable
- sale "dirty" ( < Gmc, cf OHG salo "dull, sallow, dirty")
  saleté
  salir
  salaud
  saligaud
- saleté "dirtiness"
- salir "to dirty"
  salissant
  salissure
- salle "hall"
  salon
- sarrau "frock, smock" ( < MHG sarroc "military garment" < Gmc)
- saule "willow"
- saur "dried"
  saurer
  sauret
- savon "soap" ( < Lat saponem < Gmc saipō, saipōn-, cf OHG seifa "soap", OE sāpe "soap")
  savonner
  savonnette
- savonner "to soap"
  savonnage
  savonnerie
  savonnier
  savonneux
- schelling "shilling" ( < Eng < Gmc)
- schlague "military flogging" ( < Germ schlag < Gmc)
- scion
- scruter
  scrutateur
  scrutation
  scrutatrice
  scrutement
  scruteur
  scrutin
- scrutin
  scrutiner
- sénau (Naut.) "a two-masted vessel" ( < Dut snaauw < Gmc)
- sénéchal "seneschal"
  sénéchaussée
- sénéchaussée "a seneschal's court"
- sens "sense, reason"
- sens "side of an object considered according to its orientation"
- siller (Naut.) "to trail ahead, make a wake" ( < ON sila < Gmc)
  sillon
  sillage
  sillée
- sillon "furrow"
  sillonner
- sillonner "to trace"
- sloop "sloop" ( < Eng < Gmc)
- snob
- sobriquet "nickname" ( < OFr sot + briquet < Gmc)
- soigner "to attend to"
  soigneux
- soin "care" ( < OFr soing < Frk *sunnia "concern" < Gmc)
  soigner
- sonde "fathom line"
- sonder "to sound" ( < OFr sonder < sonde "sounding line" < Gmc, cf ON & OE sund "water, sea")
  sonde
  sondage
  sondeur
- sondeur "leadsman"
- souhait "a wish"
- souhaiter "to wish"
  souhait
  souhaitable
- souille ( < OFr souil "quagmire, marsh" < Frk *saulja "wallow, mire" < Gmc, cf OE syle "wallow, miry-place")
- souiller "to sully" ( < OFr soillier, souillier "to wallow in mire" < Frk *sulljan, *sauljan < Gmc, cf OE solian, sylian "to soil", Dan søle "to soil")
- soupe "soup"
  souper
  soupière
- souper "to sup"
  souper
  soupé
  soupeur
- soupière "tureen"
- spalt "spalt"
- spath "spar"
- spirite
- stalle "stall"
  installer
- stathouder "statholder"
  stathouderat
- stockfisch "stockfish" ( < Dut stocvisch )
- stop
  stopper
- stras "strass"
- stribord "starboard"
- stuc "stucco"
- sud "south"
- suie "soot" ( < Gmc, cf OE sōtig "sooty")
- suint "grease"
- suinter "to ooze" ( < OFr suiter < Frk *switan "to sweat" < Gmc, cf OHG suizan "to sweat", Dut sweeten "to sweat")
  suint
  suintement
- sur "sour"
  suret
  surelle
  surin
- surin "young apple tree"
- surlonge "sirloin"

== T ==
- tache "spot"
  tacher
- tacher "to stain"
  tacheter
  entacher
- taisson "badger" ( < OFr tais < LL taxus < Gmc, cf OHG þahs "badger")
- talk-show "talk show"
- taler "to hurt someone" ( < taler, taller "to bruise" < Gmc *talōn "to snatch", cf OHG zālōn "to tear, remove")
  taloche
- taloche "thump on the head"
- tamis "sieve" ( < LL *tamisium < Frk *tamisa < Gmc, cf MDu temse, teemse "sifter")
  tamiser
- tampon "plug"
  tamponner
- tan "tan"
  tanner
  tanneur
  tannerie
  tanin
- tangage (Naut.) "pitching"
- tanguer (Naut.) "to pitch"
  tangage
- tanière "lair"
- tanin "tannin"
- tanner "to tan"
  tannage
  tanneur
  tannerie
- tapage "uproar"
  tapageur
- tape "tap, slap"
- taper "to slap"
  tape
  tapage
- tapinois (en) "stealthily"
- tapir "to crouch"
  tapiner
  tapinois
- tapon "bundle"
  taponner
- tapoter "to slap"
- taquer "to jolt"
- tarabuster "to pester"
- targe "target"
  target
  targette
  targuer
- tarir "to dry up"
  tarissable
  tarissement
  intarissable
- tas "heap"
  tasser
  entasser
  tassement
- tassement "a sinking, subsidence"
- tasser "to subside"
- taud "rain awning"
  taude
  tauder
- taudis "slum"
- terne (Bot.) "ternal"
  ternir
  ternissure
- teter "to suckle"
- tétin "nipple"
- tetine "an udder"
- teton "a teat"
- tette "a nipple, teat"
  teter
  tétin
  tetine
  teton
- Thiois
- tic "tic, twitch" ( < Gmc, cf Germ dial zecken, Germ zucken)
- tillac "a deck"
- tique "tick"
- tir "a shooting"
- tirailler "to pull, pester"
  tirailleur
- tirer "to draw"
  tir
  tire
  tiré
  tirade
  tireur
  tirage
  tiret
  tiroir
  attirer
  détirer
  étirer
  retirer
  soutirer
  tirailler
- tocsin "tocsin, bell" ( < toquesin < toque < Gmc + sin "bell)
- tomber "to fall" ( < MFr tumber < OFr tumer < Frk *tumōn < Gmc, cf OHG tūmōn "to reel, turn", ON tumba "to dance", OE tumbian "to dance, tumble")
  tombée
  tombereau
- tonne "tun"
  tonneau
  tonnelle
  tonnelier
  tonneler
  tonnage
- tonneau "cask"
- tonneler "to tunnel"
- tonnelier "a cooper"
  tonnellerie
- tonnelle "a vault, arbour"
- toper "to hold the suggested stake (at dice)"
- toque "a cap" ( < It tocca < Lomb tōh "pack" < Gmc)
  toquet
- toquer "to offend" ( < LL *toccare "to knock" < Gmc, cf OHG zuchōn "to strike, jerk", OE tucian "to offend, mistreat")
  toc
  tocsin
- touaille "towel, tablecloth" ( < OFr toaille < ML toacula < Frk *þwahlja < Gmc, cf OHG dwahilla)
- toucher "to touch" ( < OFr touchier, tochier < LL *toccare "to knock, strike" < Gmc, OHG zucchōn "to jerk, tug", OE tucian "to mistreat, abuse")
  touche
  toucher
  attoucher
  retoucher
- touer "to tow"
  toue
  touage
  touée
- touffe "tuft" ( < OFr toffe < Frk *topp- < Gmc, cf Germ Zopf "braid", LG topp)
  touffu
- toupet "tuft of hair" ( < OFr toupe < Frk *topp- < Gmc)
- toupie "spinning top" ( < OFr topie < Gmc, cf Eng top)
- tourbe "peat, turf"
  tourbeux
  tourbière
- trac "track"
- tracasser "to torment"
  tracas
  tracassier
  tracasserie
- transborder "to tranship"
- trappe "trap door, trap"
  attrapper
- trapu "squat, stubby" ( < OFr trape < Gmc, cf OHG taphar, tapar "heavy")
- traquenard "trap"
- traquer "to track"
  trac
  traque
  traqueur
  traquet
  traquenard
  tracasser
- trébucher "to stumble" ( < OFr tresbucher < Lat transbuccare < trans- + buccare < buccus < Frk *būk "belly, trunk" < Gmc, cf OHG būh "stomach", OE būc "belly")
  trébuchet
- trépigner "to stomp"
  trépignement
- trêve "truce"
- tribord "starboard" ( < OFr estribord < Gmc)
- tricher "to trick, cheat" ( < OFr trecher < MHG trechen "to shoot at, play a trick on", Dut trek "trick")
  tricheur
  tricherie
- trick
- tricoter "to knit"
  tricot
  tricoteur
  tricoteuse
  tricotage
- trier ( < OFr trier "to pull out from among others, choose, cull", variant of tirer "to pull out, snatch" < Goth. tiran "to pull away, remove" < Gmc., cf OE teran "to tear away")
  triage
  trial
  trialisme
  trialiste
  trié sur le volet
  trieur
  trieuse
- trille "trill" ( < It trillo < Gmc, cf Dut trillen, ME trillen)
- trimballer "to drag about" ( < earlier trinque-baller, alt. of treque-baller < MDu trekken "to drag" < Gmc)
- trimer "to run about" ( < OFr trumer < trum "calf, leg" < Frk *þrum "stub" < Gmc, cf OHG drum "end")
- tringle "line out, curtain-rod"
  tringler
  tringlette
- trinquer "to clink glasses" ( < Germ trinken "to drink" < Gmc)
- tripatouiller ″to tamper″
- tripe "tripe" ( < OFr estripe < Gmc, cf OHG striepe, strippe "belt, thin strap")
  tripaille
  tripette
  tripier
  tripière
- tripoter "to grope"
  tripot
  tripoter
  tripotage
- trique "club, cudgel"
  triquer
  triquet
- troche "cluster" ( < LL *drupea, trupea < Gmc, cf OHG drupo, Germ Traube "grape")
- troène (also *truèle) "privet" ( < OFr < Frk *trugil "little trough; hard wood" < Gmc *trūgoz, cf OHG trugilboum, harttrugil "dogwood; privet", OE trōg "trough")
- trôler "to drag or lounge about"
- trombe "waterspout"
- trombone "trombone"
- trompe "trumpet, horn"
  tromper
- tromper "to deceive"
  trompeur
  tromperie
  détromper
- trompette "trumpet"
  trompeter
- trop "too much"
  par trop
- trotter "to trot"
  trot
  trotteur
  trottoir
- trouille "fear"
  trouillard
- troupe "troop"
  troupeau
  troupier
  attrouper
- troupeau "flock"
- troupier "trooper"
- truisme "truism"
- trumeau "leg of beef"
- tunnel "tunnel" ( < Eng < Fr < Gmc)
- turf "turf" ( < Eng < Gmc)
- tuyau "pipe, tube, hose" ( < MFr tuyel < OFr tuiel, tuel < Frk *þūta < Gmc, cf OHG tuda, MDu tūte "pipe")

== U ==
- ulster "ulster coat, overcoat"
- ulster-coat "ulster coat"
- ultra-chic "ultra-chic"
- ultra-gauche (also ultragauche) "far-left"
  ultra-gauchisme (also ultragauchisme)
- ultra-gaullisme "ultra-gallic"
- ultra-gaulliste "an ultra-gallic"
- ultra-hertzien (also ultrahertzien) "ultra-hertzien"
- ultra-snob "super conceited"
- umlaut "umlaut"
- up to date "modern"
- uppercut (Sports) "uppercut"
- ure (also urus) "aurochs" ( < MHG ūr < Gmc)
- urf "turf"

== V ==
- vacarme "uproar" ( < Dut wacharmer)
- vagon "wagon"
- vague "wave" ( < ON vagr "water in motion, billow, wave" < Gmc, cf OHG wag, Goth wegs, ME waw "wave")
- vaguemestre "baggage handler"
- valser "to waltz"
- vandale "vandal"
  vandalisme
- varangue "floor of a ship"
- varech "kelp, sea-wrack"
- varlope "a jointer, plane"
  varloper
- vase "slime, mud"
  vaseux
- vasistas "casement window" ( < Germ "Was ist das?" < Gmc)
- verbiage "verbiage" ( < OFr werbloier < Frk *werbilôn, cf English "warble" "whirl" and "twirl" )
- vindas "windlass"
- voguer "to row"
  vogue
- vrac "in a jumble" ( < Dut wrac, cf Eng "wreck", "wrack", "varec", "wreak", "wretch" )

== W ==
- W.C. (also W.C) "toilette" ( < Eng water closet)
- wad
- wading
- wagage
- wagnérien
  wagnérienne
  wagnériser
  wagnérisme
- wagnerolâtre
- wagnéromane
- wagnéromanie
- wagon "wagon"
  wagon-lit
  wagon-restaurant
  wagon-salon
  wagonnage
  wagonnée
  wagonnet
  wagonnier
- walhalla
- walk-over
- walkie-talkie
- walkyrie
- wallingant
  wallingante
- wallon
  wallonisme
  walloniste
  wallonne
- warrant "warrant"
  warrantage
  warranter
- washingtonia
- wassingue
- water
  water-closet
  water-closets
  water-jacket
  water-polo
  watergang
  wateringue
  waterproof
  waters
  watringue
- watt
  watt-heure
  watté
  wattman
  wattmètre
- wavellite
- weber
- webstérite
- week-end "weekend" ( < Eng < Gmc)
- welche
- wellingtonia
- weltanschauung
- welter
- wergeld
- wernérite
- werthérien
- western
  western-macaroni
  western-soja
  western-spaghetti
- westphalien
- westphalienne
- wharf
- whig
  whiggisme
  whigisme
- whipcord
- whist "whist" ( < Eng < Gmc)
  whisteur
- white spirit
- whitérite
- wili
- willémite
- willemite
- willi
- williams
- winch
- winchester
- wintergreen
- wisigoth
  wisigothe
  wisigothique
- withérite
- witloof
- wolfram
  wolframite
- wollastonite
- würmien
- würtzite ( also wurtzite)

== Y ==
- yacht "yacht" ( < Eng < Dut < Gmc)
  yacht-club
  yachting
  yachtman
  yachtsman
  yachtwoman
- yankee
- yard
- yass
- yawl
- yé-yé (also yéyé)
- yearling
- yeoman
  yeomanry
- yo-yo (also yoyo)
  yoyoter (also yoyotter)
- yole "yawl" ( < Dut jol or LG jolle, a type of small boat < Gmc)

== Z ==
- zapper
- zappeur
- zapping
- zeppelin
- zig (also zigue)
- zigzag "zigzag" ( < Germ Zickzack < Zacke "tack, cog, tooth" < Gmc)
  zigzaguer
  zigzagant
  zigzagueur
  zigzagure
- zinc "zinc" ( < Germ Zink < Zinke "prong, tine" < Gmc)
  zinguer
  zincage (also zingage)
  zincifère
  zincite
  zinckénite
  zincographie
  zincogravure
  zincosite
- zinguer
  zinguerie
  zingueur
- zinnia
- zip
  zipper
  zippé
- zoom

== See also ==
- History of French
- Old Frankish
- Franks
- List of Spanish words of Germanic origin
- List of Portuguese words of Germanic origin
- List of Galician words of Germanic origin
- List of French words of Gaulish origin
