= List of Spanish words of Celtic origin =

This is a list of Spanish words of Celtic origin. It is further divided into words that are known (or thought) to have come from Gaulish and those that have come from an undetermined Celtic source. Some of these words existed in Latin as loanwords from a Celtic source. Some of these words have alternate etymologies and may also appear on a list of Spanish words from a different language. Any form with an asterisk (*) is unattested and therefore hypothetical.

== List ==
From English:

- túnel "tunnel"

From French:

- bachiller "graduate", from French bachelier and this from late Latin baccalaureatus "bachelor".
- batalla "battle". From bataille from battualia "military drill in fencing," from Latin battuere, see batir below.
- billar "billiard".
- brigada "brigade"
- broche "brooch, clasp, clip". From Old French broche "a spit," from Vulgar Latin (*)brocca "a nail, spike," from Latin broccus, brocchus "a nail, projecting (adj.), buck-toothed (adj.)" from Celtic (*)brokko- "a pin, badger."
- coñac "brandy"
- crema "cream" from French crème
- debate "dispute, quarrel". from Old French debat "discussion, controversy, contest" (Modern French débat, from debattre, debatre, "to fight, wrestle, struggle," from de- + battre, batre "to fight, strike," from Latin battere, battuere, see batir above.
- dolmen from French dolmen
- embajador "ambassador" and this from gaulish ambi-actos "who serves around".
- jabalina, from Middle French javeline, diminutive of javelot; akin to Irish gabhla "spear", Welsh gaflach "dart", Breton gavelod
- tenería "tannery", from French tannerie, from tan "tanbark"; akin to Breton tann "red oak", Old Cornish tannen, Old and Modern Irish tinne "mass of metal from furnace; metal bar, ingot"; (ogham letter) "holly, elder".
- pingüino "penguin" from fr. pingouin.
- tonel "barrel" from French tonel and this from Celtic *tunna "skin"
- tonelada "ton" see *tonel
- truhán "buffoon, jester" from French truand

From Italian:

- brocado "brocade". From Italian broccato, from brocco "a twist thread, shoot, sprout," see bróculi below.
- brócoli "broccoli". From Italian broccoli, plural of broccolo, "sprout of cabbage/turnip" diminutive of brocco "shoot, sprout," from Vulgar Latin (*)brocca, see broche above.

From Late or Vulgar Latin:

- abedul "birch tree" from late Latin betula "birch", diminutive of Gaulish betuā "birch"; akin to Old Irish bethe, Irish/Scottish beith, Manx beih, Welsh bedw, Breton bezv. The 'a' of abedul is by the influence of Spanish abeto "fir tree.
- álamo "white poplar"
- alondra "lark" (OSp aloa) from gaulish alauda
- alosa "shad"
- ambuesta
- amelga "plot of land marked for planting"
- añicos "shards, smithereens"
- arpende "arpent" (OSp arapende) from Latin arapennis "old measure"
- banzo "cross-bar" from common Celtic wankios}
- baranda "railing, balustrade"
- bazo "spleen" from Latin badios "red"
- beleño "henbane" from gaulish beleniom "henbane"
- belesa "leadwort"
- berrendo "bicolor(ed) (animal); pronghorn bull"
- berro "watercress" from common Celtic *beruro "watercress"
- berrueco, barrueco "granitic crag, irregular pearl, round nodule"
- betún "tar" from Latin *bitumen
- bezo "big lip"
- bodollo "pruning hook"
- boque/*buco "billy-goat, buck"
- bosta "dung" from *boud-sta (PIE *gwou- "excrement") Proto-Celtic: boud-ro "dirty"
- breca "common pandora" from Celtic *brĭcco "spotted, speckled"
- OSp bren "bran; filth"
- breña "scrubland"
- brezo "heather"
- británico "British"
- brizo "cradle, lap"
- bruja "witch"
- buco "billy goat" from a Celtic *bukko
- bustar "cow pasture"
- camba "standard, sheth (of plow)", cambija "water tower"
- cambriano "Cambrian"
- camino "way" from Celtic *camanos through lat. caminus
- cantiga "song"
- carro "cart"
- cayo
- centollo "spider crab"
- colmado
- colmena "beehive"
- combleza "mistress, home-wrecker"
- correa "belt"
- corro "circle"
- cresa "maggot"
- cueto "hillock"
- duerna "trough"
- engorar "to addle"
- eranela
- galga "large stone"
- gallardo "gaillard" from French gaillard
- gancho "hook"
- garra "claw, talon"
- garza "heron"
- gavilla "handful"
- germánico "Germanic"
- gladíola/gladiola
- greña "stubborn or tangled hair"
- gubia through the Latin gulbia from Celtic *gulbia
- güero ~ huero "vain, vacuous, without substance"
- landa "open field"
- lanza "lance"
- lanzar "to launch"
- lata "tin, tin can"
- légamo "slime, mud"
- legua "league (unit)"
- lía "dregs, lees"
- llanta
- loja, locha
- losa "flagstone" from hisp-Celtic *lausa "flagstone"
- mina "mine" through the Latin mina. However asturian mena 'vein' directly from Celtic *mena.
- páramo "moorland"
- pieza "piece" from Celtic *pĕttĭa through the Latin pĕtia.
- pingüino "penguin"
- pinzón "finch"
- pote "pot"
- quéjigo "Portuguese oak"
- raya "line"
- rodaballo "brill, seabass"
- sábalo "shad"
- sabueso "hound"
- saya "tunic", *sayo "cloak" through the Latin sagium from Celtic *sagos
- sel "mountain pasture, commons"
- serna "ploughed or sown field"
- soga "rope"
- taladro "auger, drill"
- tanino "tanine"
- tarugo "wooden peg"
- tejón "badger"
- tenería
- terco "stubborn"
- tollo "mire, muddy place"
- tona
- tranca "cudgel, club"
- trapo "rag"
- varga "straw- or thatch-roofed hut"
- varón "man"
- vasallo "vassal" from Celtic *vassallos "servant" through the Latin vassallus
- vereda "path" from Celtic *voretom through the Latin vereda "way"
- yezgo, yiezgo "dwarf elder"

== Inherited Hispano-Celtic ==
- acarrear to cart, to transport: from a- + carro (see carro' below) + the verbal infinitive suffix -ar.
- álamo "white poplar" (also Asturian llamera); akin to Irish leamhán "elm", Welsh llwyf, Cornish elow, Breton evlec'h "elm"
- alondra "lark" (OSp aloa), from Gaulish alauda "crest lark", derivative of *ala "swan", akin to Irish eala and Welsh alarch
- ambuesta, (also Catalan embosta, almosta), from Gaulish ambostā "hands together"; akin to Old Irish imbas
- amelga, (also Galician embelga) from *ambelica, from ambi "around" + el- "to go" + -ica; akin to Old Irish adellaim "to visit, go to", Welsh elo "I went", Cornish ella "he was going"
- añicos "smithereens" (also Galician anaco, Old Catalan anyoc), from *ann- + -acos
- Old Spanish arapende "arpent"; akin to Old Irish airchenn "end, extremity", Welsh arbenn "chief" and erbyn "against", Cornish erbynn "id."
- banzo "cross-bar", (also Galician banzo) from *wankio "bar, beam"; akin to Irish féige "ridgepole"
- baranda "railing, balustrade", (also Portuguese varanda, Catalan barana) from *varandā, from *rannā "part, portion"; Welsh rhan, Cornish/Breton rann, Irish roinn
- beleño "henbane", from belenion (Pseudo-Aristotle, De plantis, 7.821); akin to Welsh bela "henbane", Old Irish béal "sun"
- belga "of Belgium, a Belgian": from Latin Belga, singular of Belgae, from Gaulish Belgae, possibly meaning "the threatening (ones), the swollen (ones)," the IE root *bʰel-ǵʰ- (cf. Dutch belgen 'to worsen', originally 'to swell'), enlargement of *bʰel- "to swell"; akin to Old Irish bolgaid '(s)he swells'.
- berrendo "bicolor; pronghorn", originally just "pronghorn", from *barrovindos "white-tipped", from *barros "tip, peak" + vindos "white"; akin to Irish/Breton barr "peak", Cornish/Welsh bar "id."; also Old Irish find, Ir/Sc fionn, Welsh gwyn, Breton gwenn
- berro "watercress", (also Galician berro) from *beruro; akin to Welsh berwr, Breton/Cornish beler, Old Irish birar, Irish biolar, Scottish Gaelic biolaire
- berrueco "granite crag, cliff", from ver "over" and rocca "rock"
- berzo (dial.) (also Old Spanish brizo, Galician berce), from *bertium "load"; akin to Irish/Scottish beárt "load", bertaim "to rock"
- bezo "big lip, lip blubber" (also Galician beizo "lip"), from OSp beço "snout", from *beiccion "animal's mouth", from *baicciō "to yell"; akin to Old Irish béccim, Irish béic ‘yell, roar’, Scottish beuc, Welsh beichio ‘to low, sob’, Cornish begi ‘to bray’, Breton begiad ‘to bleat’
- bodollo (Huesca) "pruning hook", from *vidubion (also French vouge, Occitan vezoig); akin to Welsh gwyddif "billhook", Cornish gwydhyv "id.", Irish fiodhbha "sickle", Breton gouzifiad "boar-spear"
- breña "scrubland; rocky terrain", from *brigna, from briga "fortress"; akin to Middle Irish brí, genitive brig "mountain", Scottish breaghe "fortified hill", Welsh bre "hill", bryn "id", Cornish bre, brenn "hill", Breton bre "hill", bern "brooch, prickles"
- brezo "heather" (also Navarre beruezo, Galician breixo, Asturian berezu), from OSp bruezo, from *brocceus, from brūcus, from HispCelt *vroicos; akin to Welsh/Cornish grug (< *wrūcos < *wroicos), Middle Breton groegan, Old Irish froích, fróech, Irish fraoch. Similarly, Catalan bruc, Occitan bruga, Milanese brüg < *brūca.
- bruja "witch" (also Portuguese bruxa, Aragonese broixa, Catalan bruixa), from *bruxtia, from *brixta "magic"; akin to Middle Welsh brith-ron "magic wand", Breton bre "witch, magic", breoù "spells, charms", Old Irish brichtu "charms", brigim "to light up, illuminate", Brigit "shining one".
- brusco is from Italian brusco "sharp, tart, rough" and has two possible etymologies:
  - either it is akin to Welsh brysg "nimble, lively", Irish/Scottish briosg "to be surprised, to jump for joy"
  - or it is from Medieval Latin bruscus "butcher's broom plant", a blend of Latin ruscus "butcher's broom" and Late Latin brucus "heather"
- bustar "cow pasture" (OSp busto "meadow, cowfield", Portuguese bostar, Old Galician busto "dairy farm; herd"), from Celtiberian boustom "byre, cowshed" (Old Irish búas "wealth in cattle") and aro "field" (cf. Irish ár, Welsh âr, Cornish/Breton ar)
- camba "standard, sheth (of a plow)", cambija "water tower" (also Galician and Portuguese canga "yoke", Galician camba "wheel rim"), from *camba "crooked, bent", feminine of *cambos; akin to Old Irish camm 'crooked', Irish/Scottish cam, Welsh cam, Cornish/Breton kam "curved, bent"; Welsh camedd "tire rim", Breton kammed, both from *camijo.
- cargar= to load, to charge, to charge with a crime, to carry: from Late Latin carricare "to load," from carrus, see carro below.
- carril= a highway lane: from carro, see carro below.
- carro= cart, cartload, car, streetcar, coach: from Latin carrus from Gaulish carros, from the IE root (*)kers- "to run".
- centollo "spider crab", (also Galician centolo, Portuguese santola) from Celtic cintu "first" + ollos "large, big", referring to the fact it is larger than more common species of crabs; akin to Breton kent "before", Cornish kens, kyns "before, early", Welsh cynt "id.", Irish céad "first"; and Middle Irish oll "big, large", Welsh/Cornish oll "all, entire"
- colmena "beehive" (also Portuguese colmeia, Galician colmea), from *colmēnā "made from straw", from *colmos "straw" (cf. Leonese cuelmo "straw"); akin to Breton kolo "stalk" (MBr koloff)
- combleza "mistress, home-wrecker", (also Old Galician combooça) from OSp comblueça ~ conborça, from *combortia, from *com-berō "to take"; akin to Welsh cymeryd, cymryd 'to take', Breton kemer, komer, Cornish kemeres 'to take', Irish cobirth 'help'
- combo "bent", from *combos; akin to
- correa= belt, from Gallo-Latin corrigia "strap" (compare also Galician corre "twisted twig using as a bond"); akin to Old Irish cuimrech "fetter", Scottish cuibhreach "bond, chain", Welsh cyfrwy "saddle", Middle Welsh kyfreieu "leashes", Cornish kevrenn "fastening, link", Breton kevre "link, bond"
- corro "circle"; akin to Middle Irish cor "circle", corrán "sickle", Welsh cor "circle", Cornish kor "hedge, boundary; turn, shift"
- cresa "maggot" (also Galician careixa), older queresa "maggot", from *carisia "decay"; akin to Old Irish doro-chair "to fall", Irish torchair, Scottish torchuir
- duerna "trough" (also Galician dorna), from *durnos "hand"; akin to Irish dorn, Welsh dwrn, Breton dourn
- engorar "to addle", in OSp "to brood" (also Galician gorar "to brood, sit on eggs"); akin to Old Irish gorid 'to warm', Welsh/Cornish gori 'to brood, sit (on eggs)', Breton goriñ
- galga "large stone", from *gallicā, from *gallos; akin to Old Irish gall 'stone pillar', gallán 'standing stone'
- gancho "hook" (also French jachère "fallow field"), from *ganscio "small curved branch"; akin to Old Irish gesca "branch"
- garra "claw, talon"; akin to Welsh gar "leg", Corn/Bret garr "leg, stalk, stem", Old Irish gairri "calves of the leg", Irish cara
- garza "heron" (also Portuguese garça), from *cárcia; akin to Welsh crychydd, Cornish kerghydh, Breton kerc'heiz
- gavilla "handful", from gabella, from *gabali; akin to Irish gabhaim "to take", Welsh gafael "to grasp, hold", Cornish gavel; also Welsh gefel "tongs", Breton/Cornish gevel, Old Irish gabál
- greña (OSp greñón "hair, beard"), from *grennos; akin to Old Irish grend "beard", Irish greann, Welsh grann "eyelid", Breton gourenn
- gubia "gouge" (also Portuguese goiva, French gouge), from *gulbia; akin to Old Irish gulba "sting", Scottish gilb "chisel", Old Welsh gilb "piercer", Welsh gylf "beak", Old Breton golb "beak", Breton golv "tailless"
- güero ~ huero "vain, vacuous, without substance", from dialectal gorar "to brood, sit on eggs" (see engorar above)
- legua "league", from Late Latin leucas; akin to Old Irish líe (gen. líac) "stone", Irish liag
- lía "dregs, lees", légamo "slime, mud" (liga ~ lidia ~ liria "birdlime", Basque lekeda), from *liga; Old Breton leh 'silt, deposit', Breton lec'hi 'dregs', Welsh llai 'silt, deposit'
- Old Spanish mañero 'sterile, infertile', from *mannuarius, derivative of Latin mannus 'dwarf horse' (cf. Portuguese maninho 'sterile'), from Gaulish *mandos (cf. Basque mando 'mule')
- mina "mine", from *mēna (also Asturian mena "vein"), from *meina "ore"; akin to Welsh mwyn "ore", Cornish moen, Irish míanach
- páramo "moor", attested as parami, from *par- + -amus (superlative).
- pinzón "finch" (var. pinchón; also Catalan pinsà, Occitan quinçon, Tuscan pincióne) from Gaulish pinciō(ne); akin to Welsh pinc, Breton pint
- quejigo "Portuguese oak", from earlier cajigo, from Asturian caxigu (also Aragonese caxico, caixico "oak", Galician caxigo "Portuguese oak"), from *cass- (cf. Gascon casse, French chêne) + -ico; akin to Middle Irish cas "curly, gnarled", cassaim "to bend", Irish cas "to twist, turn, spin", Old Welsh cascord, Welsh cosgordd "twist"
- rodaballo "brill, seabass", from *rota-ballos "round-limbed", from rota "wheel, circle" + ballos "limb"; akin to Old Irish roth, Welsh rhod, Cornish ros, Breton rod and Irish ball "limb", Welsh balleg ‘sack, purse’, Cornish ballek ‘bow-net’
- sábalo "shad" (also Portuguese sável, Catalan saboga, Galician sable), from *sabolos; akin to Old Irish sam "summer", Welsh haf, Breton hañv, Cornish hav, with typical Celtic m > b lenition
- saya; akin to Middle Irish sén "snare", semmen "rivet", Welsh hoenyn "snare", hemin "rivet"
- sel, from *sedlon "seat"; akin to Old Welsh hadl
- serna "tilled or sown field" (also Old Galician senara, Galician senra, Portuguese seara), from *senaro, from *sen "separate, apart" + *aro "field"; akin to Old Irish sain "alone", Welsh han "other", Cornish honan "self, one's own", and Irish ár, Welsh âr, Cornish/Breton ar.
- soga (also Portuguese/Italian soga, Old French seuwe), from Gaulish *sōca; akin to Welsh/Cornish syg "chain", Breton sug "harness trace", Irish suag "rope", Scottish sùgan "straw rope"
- taladro, (also Galician trado) from *taratron; akin to Welsh taradr "drill", Irish tarachair, Cornish tarder, Breton tarar
- tarugo, from *tarūcon; akin to Scottish tarag, tarrag "nail, stud"
- tejón "badger" (also Portuguese texugo, Catalan teixó, toixó, Old French taisson, Italian tasso), from OSp texón, from Gaulish *taskios; akin to Old Irish (person's name) Tadg "badger", Scottish taghan "marten", Old Welsh (person's name) Teuhuant
- terco "stubborn" (also Catalan enterch 'stiff, rigid', Béarnais terc 'cruel, treacherous', Italian terchio, tirchio 'miserly, crude'), from *tercos; akin to Middle Irish terc, Welsh taerc 'miserly, scarce'
- tollo "mire, muddy place" (also Catalan toll "pool in a river", Galician tol "dam"), from *tollos; akin to Irish/Cornish toll "hole", Welsh twll, Breton toull
- tona, from Galician tona "skin, bark", from Gaulish *tunna, "skin, hide, rind"; akin to Old Irish tonn "skin, surface", Irish tonn "hide, skin", Welsh ton "skin", Cornish ton "surface", Breton tonnen "rind, surface". From the same source came Late Latin tunna 'wine-cask', whence French tonne 'tun' (wine-cask)', tonneau 'barrel'.
- tranca "club, cudgel" (also Portuguese/Galician tranca "door bolt"), from *tarinca; akin to Old Irish tairinge "iron nail, tine", Irish tairne "metal nail", Scottish tairnge "nail"
- truhán "jester, baffoon" (also Portuguese truão, Galician trogo "sadness, pity", French truand "vagrant, beggar"); akin to Old Irish tróg "miserable", Irish trogha, Scottish truagh, Welsh tru "wretched", Breton truc "beggar", Cornish troc "miser; wretched"
- varga (also Portuguese/Catalan barga "wattle hut", dial. French barge "haybale, straw heap"), from barga (Lat fundus bargae, in Tabula Veleiana, c. a.d. 2nd century); akin to Middle Irish barc "fort; woodhouse"
- yezgo, yiezgo "elder" (also Asturian eldu, Galician engo, Occitan augué, êgou), from older yedgo, iedgo, from *edecus, alteration of Gaulish odecus, odicus (Marcellus Empiricus, De medicamentis liber, 7.13), which was also loaned into German Attich "dwarf elder, danewort", Old Saxon aduk, Dutch hadik.

== Loanwords ==
- abatir to lower, to knock down, to humble: from Vulgar Latin abbattuere to demolish, knock down, overthrow: from ad- + Latin battuere, see batir below. The d is assimilated to the b in battuere.
- abomaso abomasum: from Modern Latin abomasum (first used in English in 1706) from Latin ab- + omasum "intestine of an ox," possibly from Gaulish.
- abrochar to button, fasten: from a- + broche "a button" (see broche below) + the verbal infinitive suffix -ar.
- atolladero a muddy place, bog: from atollar "to dirty to soil," from a- + tollo "mire, muddy place" (possibly from a Celtic word represented in Old Irish toll "hole, pit, grave") + the verbal infinitive suffix -ar.
- bachiller a bachelor: from Old French bacheler "bachelor, young man, young gentleman" (Modern French bachelier), from Medieval Latin "an advanced student, farmer," probably from Celtic, possibly related to Irish bachlach "rural dweller, farmer."
- batalla battle, struggle: from Vulgar Latin (*)battalia "combat," from Late Latin battualia "military drill in fencing," from Latin battuere, see batir below.
- batería battery: from French batterie (originally referred to a battery of kitchen utensils made with a hammer), from battre, from Latin battere, battuere, see batir below.
- batir to hit, strike: from Latin battere, battuere, "to beat, strike," probably of Celtic origin.
- batuta an orchestra conductor's baton: from Italian battuta, from battere, from Latin battere, battuerre, see batir above.
- bohemio a bohemian, of Bohemia, vagabond, eccentric, Gitano, Gypsy: from bohemio/Bohemia (from the belief that the Gitanos came from Bohemia), from Latin Boihaemum, literally "place of the Boi/Boii", from tribal name Boii + -haemum from Germanic *xaim- "home" (see bohemio here). The etymology of Boii is disputed, either "cattle-owners" or "warriors, strikers".
- brécoles broccoli
- británico from Latin britannicus, from Britannia; akin to Welsh pryd "form", Irish cruth
- broca from Vulgar Latin (*)brocca "a nail
- brocado a brocade: from Italian broccato, from brocco "a twist thread, shoot, sprout," see bróculi below.
- broche brooch, clasp, clip, fastener: from Old French broche "a spit," from Vulgar Latin (*)brocca "a nail, spike," from Latin broccus, brocchus "a nail, projecting (adj.), buck-toothed (adj.)" from Celtic (*)brokko- "a pin, badger."
- bróculi broccoli: from Italian broccoli, plural of broccolo, "sprout of cabbage/turnip" diminutive of brocco "shoot, sprout," from Vulgar Latin (*)brocca, see broche above.
- combatir to engage in combat, to fight: from com- + see batir above.
- conejo rabbit: Iberian or Celtiberian; cf Irish coinín, Cornish conyn, Manx coneeyn, Gaelic coineanach, Welsh cwningen.
- debate a debate, dispute, quarrel: from Old French debat "discussion, controversy, contest" (Modern French débat), from debattre, debatre, "to fight, wrestle, struggle," from de- + battre, batre "to fight, strike," from Latin battere, battuere, see batir above.
- jabalina, from Middle French javeline, diminutive of javelot; akin to Irish gabhla "spear", Welsh gaflach "dart", Breton gavelod
- teneria "tannery", from French tannerie, from tan "tanbark"; akin to Breton tann "red oak", Old Cornish tannen, Old and Modern Irish tinne "mass of metal from furnace; metal bar, ingot; (ogham letter) "holly, alder".

== See also ==
- Linguistic history of Spanish
- List of Galician words of Celtic origin
- List of Spanish words of Basque/Iberian origin
- List of English words of Spanish origin
- Lists of English words of Celtic origin
- List of French words of Gaulish origin

== Bibliography ==
- Cornelius Joseph Crowly, "New Linguistic Date for Hispano-Celtic: An Evaluation", Bono Homini Donum: Essays in Historical Linguistics in Memory of J. Alexander Kerns, vol. 1, ed., Yoël L. Arbeitman & Allan R. Bomhard (Amsterdam: John Benjamins, 1981), pp. 73–85.
- Guido Gómez de Silva, Breve diccionario etimológico de la lengua española (ISBN 968-16-2812-8)
- The American Heritage Dictionary of the English Language, 4th edn. (2000).
