= List of French words of Gaulish origin =

The Gaulish language, and presumably its many dialects and closely allied sister languages, left a few hundred words in French and many more in nearby Romance languages, i.e. Franco-Provençal (Eastern France and Western Switzerland), Occitan (Southern France), Catalan, Romansch, Gallo-Italic (Northern Italy), and many of the regional languages of northern France and Belgium collectively known as langues d'oïl (e.g. Walloon, Norman, Gallo, Picard, Bourguignon, and Poitevin).

What follows is a non-exhaustive list of inherited French words, past and present, along with words in neighboring or related languages, all borrowed from the Gaulish language (or more precisely from a substrate of Gaulish).

== Modern French ==
=== A-B ===
French	Cognates	Etymology	Possible Celtic Cognates	Latin/Romance equivalents
aller 'to go'	FrProv alâ, allar, Friul lâ	Gaul *allu	Welsh êl 'that he may go', eled 'go!', Cornish ellev 'that I may go', Old Irish adall 'diverticulum'	Lat ambulare (cf. Ital ambiare, Rom umbla), andare (cf. Sp/Pg andar, Occ/Cat anar, Italian andare)
alose 'shad'	Occitan alausa, Prov alauso, La Rochelle alousa, Sp alosa, G Alse	Gaul alausa 'allis shad'	none	-
alouette 'lark'	Walloon alôye, Prov alauza, alauseta, Cat alosa, alova, OSp aloa, Sp alondra, It allodola, lodola	Old French aloe, aloue, fr Latin alauda 'crest lark', fr Gaul, perhaps from *alaio 'swan'	OIr elu 'swan', Irish/Scottish eala 'swan'; with suffix, Welsh alarch 'swan', Breton alarc'h 'swan'	borrowed into Latin
ambassade 'embassy'	Prov embeissado, Occ ambaissada, Port embaixada, Sp embajada	From Ital ambasciata 'charge, mission, embassy', fr Old Occ ambayassada 'embassy', from ambaissa 'service, duty' 'hostage', fr Gaul ambactus 'dependant, vassal'	OIr amos, amsach 'mercenary, servant', Ir amhas 'wild man', W amaeth 'tenant farm', C ammeth 'farming', OBr ambaith	-
amélanche 'shadberry, shadbush'	Occ amalenco, amalanco	Prov. amalenco, amalanco, from Gaul. aballo 'apple' and -enco, diminutive suffix from Germanic -ing	OIr aball, Ir/Sc ubhall, W afal, C aval, Br aval	unknown in Latin
andain 'swath, scythe slash'	-	OFr andain 'wide step', from Gallo-Latin andagnis 'big step', from Gaul. ande 'big, great' and agnis 'step', from agi 'to move'	Ir an- 'very' + OIr áin 'activity, play'	-
ardoise 'slate'	It ardesia	Gaul. artuas 'stelae, stone plates', plural of *artuā 'stone, pebble'	OIr art 'stone', Ir airtín, Sc airtein 'pebble'	-
arpent 'arpent acre'	OSp arapende, Sp arpende, Prov arpen	ML arependis, fr Latin arepennis, from Gaulish	OIr airchenn 'short mete or bound (abuttal); end, extremity', W arbenn 'chief'	system of measurement alien to Latin
auvent 'eaves, porch roof, penthouse roof'	Prov. ambans 'parapet', Occitan embans, French dial. arvan	MFr auvans (pl) 'sloping roof', fr OFr anvant (1180), fr Gaul. andebanno 'overhang, forward jutting part of a roof', fr ande (augmentative prefix) + banno 'horn, antler'	for banno, see below under section Patois	unknown to Mediterranean architecture
aven 'sinkhole, swallow hole'	Occ avèn 'abyss, whirlpool', Cat avenc, Asturian aboñón 'channel, drain', Galician abeneiro, Port. amieiro 'alder (tree)'	OFr avenc, from Old Occ, from Gaul. abona 'river'	W afon, C avon, Br avon, aven, Sc abhainn, Ir abha, abhainn	-
bâche 'canvas sheet, tarpaulin'	Gasc bascojo 'hanging basket', Asturian bascayu, Port. basculho/vasculho, Béarn bascoyes, Fr (dial) bâchot, bachou	OFr baschoe 'type of hod', from Gaul. bascauda 'wicker chest, hamper', from *basca 'binding'	W basg 'plaiting', MIr basc 'neckband'	-
balai 'broom (sweep)'	Sp baleo 'broom (plant)', Astur baléu	OFr balain 'broom (plant)', from Gaul *balatno, metathesis of *banatlo	MBr balazn (mod. balan), Sc bealaidh, Ir beallaidh vs. W banadl, C banadhel	Lat. scobum (cf. Fr dial. écouvillon)
barge^{1} 'godwit'	Liguro berta 'magpie'	Gaulish bardala, diminutive of bardos 'bard'	MW bardd 'poet', OIr bard, MBr barzh 'minstrel', OC barth 'mime, jester'	Lat. corydallus (from Greek korydallis)
barge^{2} 'haybale, straw heap' (Western)	Sp/Port varga "thatch-roof hut, straw-roof hut", Cat/Pg/Occ/Liguro barga "wattle hut", Ital barca "haystack"	Gaul bargā (Latin fundus bargae, in Tabula Veleiana, 2nd century)	MIr barc 'fort; woodshed' (< *bargā)	-
barnache, bernache 'barnacle goose'	-	OFr bernaque, fr Gaul. barenica 'limpet', fr barenos 'rock, boulder' (cf. OIr barenn 'boulder'); for semantic development, compare Greek lépas 'rock' > lepás 'limpet'	Ir báirneach, Sc bàirneach, W brennig, C brennik, Br bernig, brennig	-
bassin 'basin'	Prov. bacha 'feeding trough', FrProv bachè, bacha 'large vat', Amognard bassie 'sink'	OFr bacin, from ML baccinum, from LL bacca 'wine or water jug', from Gaulish 'burden, load to bear'	Ir/Sc bac 'hindrance, heed', W baich 'load, burden', C begh 'load, burden', Br bec'h 'burden, toil'	-
battre 'to beat'	Cat batre, Sp. batir, Emilian batü 'beaten, beat', Port. bater	Latin battuere, from Gaulish *battu 'I strike, hit'	W bathu 'to coin, mint (money)', C bathi 'to coin, mint (money)'	-
bauge 'wild boar den; cob, hut'	FrProv (Swiss) bache 'swamp hay', Prov bauco, balco 'rough-leafed grass, tuft of hay, swamp grass used as bedding', OProv terra bauca 'good, solid turf'	OFr balche, from Gaul balco 'strong'	OIr balc, Ir bailc, Sc bailceach, W/C balch, Br balc’h	-
baume 'grotto'	Prov baumo, Cat balma, Lombardo balma, Piedmontese barma, Ligurian arma	Gaul *balma	Ir baile 'home; town'	-
bec 'beak'	Cat bec, It becco, Port. bico, Sp pico	Latin beccus 'beak', from Gaul *beccos 'beak', perhaps originally 'little'	perhaps OIr becc 'little', Ir/Sc beag, W bach; diminutives C byghan, Br bihan	Lat rostrum
belette 'weasel'	Lorrain belâ, blâ, Liguro bélloa, Venetian belita, Piem/Lomb. bellola, Sp dial. belida, bilidilla	From FrPov belete, from Gaul bela	MW beleu, W bele, belaod (pl.) 'marten'	Lat mustella (cf. OFr moistele)
benne 'handbarrow, dumpster, mine cart', banne 'awning; large wicker basket'	It benna 'dung cart', G (Swabish) Bann 'cart, hod', G Behner 'basket', Du ben, benne 'basket', E bin	Gaul benna	W benn 'cart', OIr buinne, Br karr-banner 'truck bed', OBr benn 'caisson (chariot)'	-
berle 'water parsnip'	Sp berro Ast berriu 'watercress' (< beruro)	Gaul. berula 'cress', diminutive of beru 'stake, spit'	W berwr, C/Br beler, OIr biror, Ir biolar, Sc biolaire; further to Ir/Sc bior, W bêr, C/Br ber	-
berceau 'cradle', bercer 'to rock', ber 'drydock'	Prov bressà 'to rock', brès 'cradle', Port. berço 'cradle', Sp dial. brezar 'to rock', brezo 'cradle'	OFr bers, berz 'cradle', fr Gaul. *bertu 'I rock', fr *berta 'load'	Ir beartaim 'I rock', beárt 'load, action'; further to OIr brith, breth f. 'carrying; judgment', W bryd m. 'thought, mind, intent', C brys 'thought', Br bred 'psyche'	Lat. cunabula
bief 'mill reach, mill race'	Genoese (Liguro) bëo 'ditch, channel', Asturian beyu' 'narrow gorge' (< bedio) and buelga 'ditch' (< bodika)	OFr bied, from Gaul. *bedo 'ditch; grave'	W bedd 'grave', Br bez, C bedh	-
bille 'log'	Prov. bilha 'stem, trunk'	Gaul. *billia 'tall tree'	Mx billey 'tree', Ir billeóg 'leaf', billeoir 'tree trunk', Sc bileag, bile 'leaf, blade'	-
boisseau 'bushel'	Lyon emboto 'two handsful', Cat ambosta, almosta, Sp ambuesta	Diminutive of OFr boisse 'dry measure of grain', Gallo-Lat. *bostia 'hollow of the hand', fr Gaul. *bosta; cognates from *ambostā	Br boz, OW bos, MIr boss, bass, Ir bass; OIr imbas 'clasped hands'	-
bonde, bondelle 'bunghole'	OProv bonda	Gaul. bunda 'base, bottom'	OIr bunud, MIr bond, Sc bonn 'foundation', W bonedd 'base, foundation'	-
borne 'milestone, landmark'	-	OFr bonne, bosne, fr earlier bodne, Gallo-Lat. bodina ‘arbre frontière’, fr Gaul. bodînâ ‘troop’	OIr buiden 'squadron', Ir/Sc buidhean/n 'regiment', W byddin 'grove', Br bodenn, bod 'thicket'	-
boue 'mud'		Gaul *bawā	W baw 'filth, muck', budr 'dirty, messy', OIr búaidir 'dirty', Br (Ouessant) baouer 'gooey stubstance (from seaweed)', C beudhowr 'filthy water'	Lat. lutum
bouge 'hovel, dive'		Gaul. boutigo 'cow byre', compound of bou 'cow' and tego 'house'	Br boutig, W beudy, Ir bothigh; further to Ir bó, MW bu 'oxen' and Ir teach, g. tí, Sc taigh, Br/OC ti, C chi, W tŷ	-
bouillon-blanc 'mullein'	-	ML bugillō, fr Gaul., fr boccos 'soft'	Br beuk, Ir bog	Lat verbascum (cf. Sp varbasco)
bouleau 'birch'	Ardennais boule, Prov bes(se), Cat beç, bedoll, Sp abedul (< betulu) and biezo (< betyo) Ast abedugu (< betuko)	Diminutive of OFr boule, from Lat. betula, dim. of Gaul. betua 'birch'	Ir/Sc beith, W bedw, Br bezv, Manx beih	-
bourbe 'muck, mire'	Galician/Port. borba 'mud', Asturian borbolla 'bubble', Sp burbuja 'bubble'	Gaul borvon 'spring, well'	Ir bearbh 'boiling', W berw 'boiling, seething', Br berv 'broth, bubbling'	-
bourdaine 'alder buckthorn'	ONorm borzaine, French dial. bourg-épine, Walloon neûr-bôr, Basque burgi 'alder buckthorn', German Eberesche (Aberesche, Eberbaum) 'service-tree', Flemish haveres (influenced by haver 'oat')	From Western dialect, from OFr bourgène, from Gaul *eburi-gena, from eburos	W efwr 'cow parsnip', dial. (N) ewr, Br evor 'alder buckthorn', Sc iubhar 'yew', Ir iúr, OIr ibar	-
brai 'pitch'	Prov brac, It brago, braco 'mud', OFr bragnier 'to plow'	Gaul *bracu	W bracu 'filth', MIr broch 'garbage'	Lat pix (cf. Fr poix)
braie(s) 'breeches, pants'	Prov/Sp. braga, It braca, Emilian brêgh 'trousers' and braghein 'short trousers'; Br bragoù	Lat. braca	-	-
braire 'to bray', brailler 'to bawl, whine'	-	Late Latin bragire, from Gaulish *bragu	MIr braigid 'it crashes, explodes', Ir/Sc braigh 'to shriek, crackle', Br breugiñ 'to bray'	-
bran 'filth'	Berry/Picard brin, Prov/OSp bren, It (dials) brenno	OFr bren 'bran, filth', from Gaul. brennos 'rotten'	OIr brén, Ir bréan 'smelly, rancid', Sc breun, W braen 'stench', braenu 'to rot', Br brein	Lat. caecum 'filth' (cf. Sp cieno)
branche 'treelimb'	Prov/Cat branca 'paw', Port. braça 'treelimb', It brance 'claw, paw', Romansch dial. franka, Rum brânca	Late Latin branca 'paw', from Gaul. *vranca	Br brank, branc'h 'bough, antlers', Sc bràc 'branch, antler; reindeer'	Lat. ramus
brasser 'to brew'	Fr dial. brai, bray 'malt'	OFr bracer, fr brace 'malt', fr Gaul brace	OIr mraich, Sc braich, W/C brag 'malt', Br bragez 'wheat germ'	-
brave 'brave, daring'	Occ/Cat. brau 'tough, wild'	MFr brave, fr It bravo 'bold', fr Occ brau 'wild', fr Gaul. bragos 'show-off'	MIr breagha 'fine', Ir breá, Sc brèagh, C bray, Br braga 'to strut around'	-
bréhaigne 'barren (animal)'	Pg/Galician/Astur/Salander braña, Port. brenha 'swampland, bogland, humid meadow', Sp breña 'scrubland', NW Cat braina 'field of grain whose ears have not sprouted yet', N. Ital. barena 'flood plain of a lagoon'	OFr baraign, brahain, fr Lat. brana ‘sterile mare’, fr Gaul. *branna 'land where nothing grows', fr *brenno 'rotten'	Ir branar, W braenar 'fallow', Br breinar; see bran above	-
breuil 'copse'	Prov brogo, Emilian bröl 'orchard, vegetable garden', Germ. Brühl 'prairie'	OFr bruil (attested ML breialo (Vienna Glossary)), fr Gaul *brogilos 'thicket, hunting reserve', diminutive of brogos 'country'	W/C/Br bro 'country', Ir bruig, Sc brugh 'tumulus, large house', Mx broogh 'brae, bank'	-
bribe 'fragment, parcel'	Pic brife 'bit of bread'	Gaul. briba	W briw 'fragments', C bryw, Br brev 'broken', Sc breaban 'leather patch', Ir preaban 'parcel, piece, patch'	-
briser 'to break'	Emilian brisa 'bit of bread', 'nothing', 'not', It briciola	OFr brisier, fr Gaul. brissu 'I break'	OIr brissim, Ir/Sc bris, Mx brishey	Lat frangere (cf. OFr fraindre)
broche 'spit, skewer'	Asturian bruecu 'pointed, sharp'	Gaul. brocca, fr broccos 'pointed'	Sc brog 'awl; to prod', W procio 'to poke, thrust', Ir prioc; OIr brocc 'badger', Ir broc, W broch, Br broc'h	-
brosse 'brush'	Cat brossa, Spanish, Asturian broza 'dead leaves, dead brushwood'; OFr bruisse 'chestnut hull, chestnut husk' (< Gaul. bruskia)	OFr broce, fr Gaul. bruskia	*bhreus-kyo < 'which it's broken', *bhreus-o 'break', P-Celt. *bruso 'fragile (EDPC: 81).	
bruire 'to roar; rustle, murmur'	-	Gaul. bruge 'to troat'	W broch 'din, tumult', Br broc'h(ad) 'quarrel, discord, falling out', Sc broiglich 'noise', broighleadh 'turmoil'; Ir brúcht 'belch'	-
bruyère 'heath, moor'	Prov bruguiera 'moorland', Cat bruguera; Milan brüg, Ital brugo, Prov bruga, Germ (dial. Mainz) Brikane, Cat bruc; Sp brezo, (Navarre) beruezo, Gal breixo, Port brejo (< *broccius)	Gallo-Lat. brucaria, fr brūcus, fr late Gaul *vroikos, fr earlier vroici, vroica	W grug, dial. (Pembroke) gwrig, C grig, MBr groegan, Ir fraogh, Sc fraoch, Manx freoagh	-
bugle 'bugle (plant), bugleweed'	Mantuan bög 'soft fruit, overripe fruit'	OFr bucle, fr LL bugula, fr Lat bugīlla, fr Gaul., diminutive of buccos 'soft'	MIr bocc 'soft', Ir/Sc bog 'soft', Br bouk 'soft, mild'	-

=== C-G ===
French	Cognates	Etymology	Possible Celtic Cognates	Latin/Romance
cabane 'cabin, cob'	OFr chavane 'small farmstead', Emilian capanoun 'barn', Lombard capanon	fr Prov. cabana 'cob, cottage', fr Gaul. capanna 'hut', fr cappos 'cob, tent'	W caban 'booth, hut', Br koban 'booth, awning', Ir/Sc cabán 'hut, booth, tent', Port cabana; further to W cab 'cot, tent', MIr cap(p) 'cart, bier'	-
caillou 'pebble'	MFr chaillou, chail, Pic caillau, Poit. chail, SwFr/Fr-Comt chaille, Port. calhau, Prov. calado, Astur. cayuela 'pebble, chestnut'	Normand or Picard, fr Gaul. caliavo 'pebbly', fr cali 'pebble'	W caill, C kell, Br kell, kall, Ir caull 'testicle'	-
canton 'township'	Old Occ. canton from N. It. cantone	O.Fr chant, L. canthus, from Gaul. cantos	W cant, Br cant	-
cervoise 'barley beer'	Port. cerveja, Span. cerveza	Gaul. cervesia	C corev 'beer,' W cwrw 'beer, ale'	-
chainse 'linen canvas, undershirt'	-	OFr chainse 'tunic', fr L camisia 'shirt', fr Gaul.	OIr caimmse 'shirt', W obs. cams(e) 'surplice, alb', C kams 'surplice, alb', Br kamps 'hem'	*Note: chemise 'shirt' is an early learned borrowing and not inherited
changer 'to change, exchange'	Sp. cambiar, Ast. cambéu 'exchange'	OFr changier, from L cambiāre 'to barter', earlier cambīre, from Gaul cambion 'exchange'	Br kemm 'exchange', OIr cimb 'ransom'	Lat. muto, mutatio
char 'wagon', charrue 'plough'	Basq ekarri 'to bring', OProv carruga 'cart' Astur. carru, Port. charrua, Emilian car 'chariot, wagon' and carét 'cart'	L carrus 'chariot', fr Gaul. carros; L carracutium, fr Gaul. carruca 'ceremonial plough'	Ir carr 'dray, wagon', W carr 'chariot', C/Br karr 'cart'	-
charançon 'weevil'	-	MFr charenson, dim. of OFr *charenz, from LL *caranteus, fr Gaul. *carvantos, fr carvos 'stag'	W carw, C karow, Br karv, OIr carbh, Ir cáirrfhiadh	-
charpente 'framework, building frame'	Lorr charpagne 'hamper', Port cabaz 'hamper', Welche charpin ‘large osier basket’, Friul čharpint ‘cart axle’	L carpentum, fr Gaul. carbanto 'carriage', fr carbos 'basket'	Ir carbat, Sc carbad, W cerbyd, OBr cerpit	-
chat-huant 'tawny, brown, or wood owl'	OPic coan, Judeo-French javan, FrProv (Swiss) tsavouan	MFr chouan, fr L cavannus, fr Gaul.	Ir ulchabhán, W tyllhuan, cuan, C kowann, Br kaouenn	-
chemin 'way, path, route'	Sp. camino, FrProv tch’mïn, Prov. camin, Astur. camín, Port. caminho	LL camminus 'step, footpath, tollspot', fr Gaul. camani, plural of camanom 'step'	Ir céim 'stride', pl. céimmenn, Sc ceum, W/C cam 'step', OW pl. cemmein 'steps', Br kam 'step'	-
chêne 'oak'	Prov cassanh, Gasc casse, FrProv (Swiss) tsâno, Port. caixigo, Astur caxigu, Aragon caixico	OFr chasne, chesne, fr LL casnus, fr Gaul. cassanos literally, 'twisted, gnarled'	Ir cas 'to twist, turn, spin', W cosgordd 'to twist'	L quercus
chétif 'wretched, meek, weakling'	Prov caitiu, Mantuan catif 'bad'	OFr chaitif, blend of Gaul. caxtos 'prisoner' and Lat captivus 'prisoner'	W caeth 'slave, confined', C keth 'slave', Br kaezh 'miserable, unfortunate', Ir cacht 'distress, prisoner'	-
cheval 'horse'	It cavallo, Sp. caballo, Port. cavalo, Rum cal; Germ (Swabish) Kōb 'nag' (< cabō), Lom. cavall, Em. caval	Latin caballus 'nag', from Gaul. caballos, variant of cabillos 'work horse, nag', dim. of cabō (> L)	W ceffyl, Br kefel, Ir capall, Manx cabbyl	Lat equus
claie 'rack, fence post, hurdle'	Gasc cleda 'small gate', Cat. cleda 'cattle pen, sheepfold', Aragonese cleta 'wooden gate', Portuguese cheda 'wagon bed', Basq gereta	VL cleta, fr Gaul.	W clwyd 'gate, hurdle', Br kloued 'fence, harrow', C kloes 'hurdle, lattice', Ir/Sc clíath 'hurdle'	-
cloche 'bell'	Germ Glocke, Galician choco, Port. chocalho, 'cowbell'	Gaul. clocca	Ir/Sc clog, W cloch, C klogh, Br kloc’h	Lat tintabulum
coche 'brood sow', cochon ‘pig’	Wal cosset, cosson, Morvan coisson ‘piglet’, Sp. cochino ‘pig’	Gaulish *coccā ‘hip’, akin to coxo ‘foot’ (for sense development, compare obs. German †Hackshe ‘brood sow’ from Hachse ‘hock’)	Old Irish coch ‘hip’; further to OIr coss ‘foot’, W coes, C koes, Br koaz ‘leg’	-
combe 'hollow'	Occ comba 'valley', Cat coma, Port. comba, Astur. comba	LL cumba 'dishes', fr Gaul. comba 'concave, cavity, depression'	W cwm 'hollow', C komm 'small valley, dingle', Br komm 'trough, valley, deep water', Ir com 'chest cavity', OIr comm 'vessel'	-
corme 'service berry'	-	LL corma, fr Gaul. curmi 'ale, beer'	OIr cuirm, coirm, gen. corma 'beer', W cwrw, cwrwf, cwrf 'ale', C/Br korev	-
coudrier 'hazel'	Amognes coudrette, queudre, FrProv cudra, Romansch coller; Occ còila 'hazel switches, hazel osiers'	OFr coldre, from Gallo-Latin colurus, blend of Gaul collos and Lat corulus	OIr coll (mod. coill), W coll, C koll, Br (lit.) kollenn)	Lat corulus
coule 'religious cowl'	-	OFr coule, goule 'cowl', fr Lat. cucullus, fr Gaul., reduplication of cullo 'covering, shelter'	OIr cuilche ‘mantel’, cuile ‘cellar’, MIr cul ‘defense, shelter’	-
craindre 'to fear'	Saintangois crénre, Prov crénher	Old French creindre, from VL *cremere, from Gaul. *crenu ‘I shake’ + L tremere ‘to shake’	W crynu, Br/C krena; W cryn 'shaking', Br kren, C crên	Lat timere (cf. OFr temir, It temere, Rmsch temair, Cat temer)
cravan 'brant goose'	-	Western dialect cravant 'wild goose', fr *cragu- + -ant, fr Gaul. *crago 'hoarse'	W cregu 'to be hoarse', cryg 'hoarse', C kreg 'hoarse'	-
crème 'cream'	FrProv (Lyon) cramiot 'spittle'	OFr cresme (influenced by LL chrisma 'ointment'), fr Gaul crāmum ‘skim, skin’	W cramen 'scab', C kramm, Br kramm, kremm, MIr screm 'surface, skin'	-
créner 'to indent, notch, carve', cran 'notch, catch'	-	Gaul. crinos 'collapsed, fallen in'	OIr ar-a-chrinim 'I collapse, crumble, shatter', crinner 'fall', crín 'withered, decayed'	-
creux 'hollow, pit, dip'	Fr-Prov cros 'hollow, cave', Prov. cros 'tomb', Occ. cro, Ligurian creusa, creuso	OFr crues, fr Gallo-Lat. crosus, fr Gaul. *crossos	-	-
daim 'roedeer'	-	Lat. damma, dammus, from Gaul dammos 'ox, stag'	OIr dam 'ox, stag', damán 'fawn', Ir damh 'ox'; W dafad, C davas, Br dañvad 'sheep'	-
dartre 'rash, blemish, breakout; dartars'	Poit endarde, Lombard dérbeda, Valais. diervet, Prov derbi, derti, It (dial) derbi, derbga	Old French dertre, from Lat. derbita, from Gaul *derveta	Br darvoued, derbod, W tarwyden, darwyden 'scurf, dandruff', OIr deir 'herpes'	-
décombres 'debris, rubble', encombrer 'to encumber'	Germ Kummer 'rubble', Sp. escombro 'rubble', Port. cômoro 'mound, hillock'	OFr combre 'river barrage, dam', from ML combrus 'barricade of felled trees', from Gaul. combero 'river fork, dam'	Br kember, W cymmer, Ir comar, cumar, OIr commor, cummar	-
douve 'liver fluke'	Norm duve, FrCmt dôrve, Bas-Alpes endervo, Corrèze olvo	Gaul. *dolba 'grub, caterpillar', from *dolbu 'I chisel, carve'	OIr dolbaid 'he forms, shapes'	-
draine, drenne 'mistle thrush'	Tecino dren 'raspberry', Comasc dren 'blackberry', Milan drine 'hawthorn'; partially Pic fourdraine 'sloe'	Gaul. drageno 'thorn, briar'; semantic development 'thorn bush' > 'aggressive bird'	OIr draigen, Ir/Sc droigheann, W/Br draen, C drain/drein	-
drap 'cloth'	It. drappo, Sp/Pg trapo, Emilian drap, Cat drap	Late Latin drappus 'piece of fabric', from Gaul. *drappo 'shred, torn-off piece'	W drab 'piece, shred', drabio 'to tear into pieces'	-
drèche 'brewing dregs'	Prov draco 'wine lees', Dauph drachi 'stamped raisin bunch', Wall drâhé	OFr drasche 'barley dregs; raisin skin', from Gaul. drasca	MIr tresc 'refuse, offal', Ir treascach 'draffy', Sc treasg 'dregs'	-
drille 'rag, tatter'	Lyon drouille 'tatter', Dauph. drouille 'wood chip'	OFr drille 'fabric scrap', fr Gaul. *drullo 'piece, shred'	W dryll 'fragment, small piece', MBr druill, C dral 'scrap, fragment', Sc dreall/dreoll 'door bar';	-
dru 'thriving, hardy, fit, thick'	Bourb drusine 'vigor', Amognard dru 'lively', druger 'to grow, get livelier', Prov. endrudi 'to enrich', OProv drut 'lover', NItal drü 'fat, thick', Milan druto 'exuberant'	OFr dru 'lively; fat', from Gaul. drūtos	W drud 'brave, valliant, furious', OIr drúth, édruith 'lewd, extravagnt', Sc drùth 'lecherous', Br druz 'fat, fit, fertile'	-
érable 'maple'	FrProv iserâblo	OFr airable, from LL acerabulus, blend of abolo 'apple' and Lat. acer ‘maple’ (akin in formation to W criafolen 'rowan', afol tindoll 'medlar', OIr fic-abull 'fig tree')	-	Lat acer
étain 'tin, pewter'	Sp. estaño, Emilian stajgn 'hard', Port. estanho	Lat stagnum, var. stannum, fr Gaul. stannon (according to Pliny)	Ir stán, OSc stàn, W ystaen, C sten, Br stean	-
flannelle 'flannel'	Jersiais flianné 'flannel', Emilian flanèla 'flannel'	Old Normand flanelle, fr OFr flaine 'coarse wool', fr Gaul. vlana 'wool'	W gwlân 'wool', gwlanen 'flannel', C gwlan, Br gloan, Ir olann, Manx ollan	-
fragon 'butcher's broom'	Walloon frigon	OFr fregon, fr Gaul. *sprigo	W ffreu 'fruit'	-
gaillard 'festive, hardy, merry'	-	Gaul. galia 'might', Mantuan gaiard'hardy, strong'	W obsolete †gâl 'strength', gall 'energy', OBr gal, Br galloud 'power', C gallos 'ability', OIr gal, gallacht 'valor'	-
galet 'flat rock, skipping stone'	Fr dial. jalet 'stone projectile of cross bow'	Normand or Picard, fr Gaul. gallos 'large rock'	OIr gall 'stone pillar', gallán 'large upright stone'	-
galon 'galon', jalon 'marker'	Cat galleda ‘bucket’	OFr jalon ‘liquid measure’, diminutive of jale 'porringer', fr LL galla ‘vessel, container’, fr late Gaul. *glāvo 'rain', fr earlier *glōvo	W glaw 'rain', Br glao, C glaw	-
garenne 'rabbit warren'	Fr dial. varaigne, Astur. varagaña 'enclosure'	Gaul. varena 'enclosed area' (cf. varonadas (nom. pl.))	Ir/Sc fearann 'land, enclosure', OIr feronn 'field', ferenn 'girdle, garter'	-
gerzeau 'corncockle'	OFr jargerie, jarzerie 'cockle, weed', Val d’Aoste dardillon 'pignut'	Gaul. gargos 'wild; bitter'	Ir/Sc garg 'wild; bitter'	-
glaise 'loam'	Normand glise	OFr gleise, gloise, fr Gallo-Lat glisomarga 'clay marl', fr Gaul. gliso 'white'	W glwys 'bright, pretty', OBr gloes 'pretty', OIr glése 'brightness', Ir/Sc gleus 'order, trim, tune'	-
glaive 'broad sword'	-	From *gladibu, blend of Lat gladius + Gaul. cladebos	W cleddyf, Br kleze, C cledhe, OIr claideb, Ir claíomh, Sc claidheamh	Lat ensis
glaner 'to glean'	OProv glenar	OFr glener, fr LL glenare, fr Gaul. glennu 'I gather, sort', fr glanos 'clear, pure'	OIr glenn- 'to choose, amass', do-glinn 'he collects, gathers', MIr digliunn 'I glean', W (SW) dichlyn 'to select, sort out'	-
gober 'to gobble, guzzle, devour', gobe 'morsel, gob'	-	OFr gobe, fr Gaul. gobbo	Ir gob 'mouth', Sc/Manx gob 'beak', W gwp 'bird's head/neck'	-
gord 'kiddle, stake net'	Prov. gòrsa 'hedge, bush', Limousin gorso 'bush', Lombard gorz 'bush'	OFr gort 'boundary hedge', from Gaulish gorto 'yard; hedge' (because of its shape)	Ir gort 'wheatfield', W garth 'hill, enclosure', Corn gorth, OBr orth 'yard, enclosure'	-
gosier 'gizzard'	Wal. djwèhe, Lorr. gosse, Ardenn. gosi 'gizzard', gosillon 'Adam's apple', Friul gose, It gozzo, Rum guşă ‘maw, goiter’, Emilian gòs	OFr geuse, josier, from VL geusiae 'gizzard edges', from Gaulish, from *geusi 'to pour'	W gewai 'glutton'	-
gouge 'gouge, chisel'	OProv goja, It gubba, Sp gubia, Port. goiva	Gaul. gulbia 'piercer', fr *gulbu 'beak'	OIr gulba 'sting', W gylyf 'sickle'	-
graisset 'green tree frog'	Occ grasan, graissan 'toad', Cat grexá 'toad', gresandu 'tadpole'	MFr gresset, from Gaul. *craxantos (attested craxaulus), from craxa 'scab, rough patch'	W crach 'crust, scab', C kragh 'scurf', Br krak 'gruff'	-
grève 'sandy shore, sandy beach', gravier 'gravel'	Fr (Western dials.) groue, Prov/Cat/Astur. grava, Venit grava, Friul grave	Gallo-Lat. grava, fr Gaul. gravis	Br gro 'silt', C grow 'gravel', W gro 'gravel'	-
guenille 'rag, tatter'	-	Western dialect, from guener, gueniller 'to wet, dampen', fr guène, gâne 'pond, pool', fr OFr gasne 'muddy pool', fr Gaul. vāgna ‘slope; moor’	C/Br geun 'swamp', W gwaun 'lowland, meadow', Ir fann 'slanting, sloping', fána 'downward slope, hollow'	-

=== I-Z ===
French	Cognates	Etymology	Possible Celtic Cognates	Latin/Romance
if 'yew'	Prov (Maritime) liéu	Gaul. ivos	W yw, C ywin, Br iwin, OIr eó	Lat. taxus (cf. Occ teis, FrProv dêx, Romansh taisch)
jachère 'fallow field'	Sp gancho 'large hook' (< gansciu)	LL gascaria 'scratch-plough', fr Gaul. gansko 'branch'	OIr gesca 'stem, branch'	LLat. vervactum (cf. Fr guéret 'tilled but unsown field', Sp barbecho)
jaillir 'to gush, spurt'	Norm galir 'to throw'	Gaul. gali 'to boil'	Ir gailim 'to boil over', Manx gaal 'steam', Sc goil 'to boil', gèil 'to bubble, well up'	-
jante 'wheel rim'	Pic gante, Occ cant, Sp canto, It canto 'corner'	L canthus, cantus, fr Gaul. cantos	Br kant 'ring', W cant 'felloe, rim', MIr céte 'gathering (in a circle)', Ir cétal, s. canó, OW canten, cantem	-
jarret 'hamstring, bend of the knee'	OProv/Sp garra 'claw', Prov garro, Fr dial. gare, jarre 'thigh'	OFr garet, diminutive of gare 'leg, thigh', Mantuan garét, diminutive of 'leg' and galùn 'thighs' from Gaul. garra 'leg'	W gar, C/Br garr, OIr gairri 'calves of the leg', Ir cara	-
javelle 'sheaf, fagot, bundle'	OOcc gabella, Occ gavèl, Port. gavela, gabela, Sp gavilla	LL gabella, fr Gaul. gabali 'armfull', fr gabu 'to take'	W gafael 'to grasp, hold', C gavel 'grasp, hold', MIr gabáil	-
javelot 'javelin'	-	Gaul. gabalaccos, fr gabalos 'fork', Mantuan giavlòt 'javelin'	Ir gabhla, gen. gablach 'spear', W gaflach 'dart'	-
lance	-	L lancea, fr Gaul lankia, Mantuan lansa 'lance' and lansér 'lancer', Port. lança	MIr do-léicim 'I toss, fling, launch'	-
lande 'heath, moor'	Port. landa	Gaul landa	Breton lann 'heath', W llan 'village, yard', C lan 'open space, plain', lann 'enclosure', Ir/Sc lann 'enclosure'	-
landier 'andiron, firedog'	Basq andere 'woman', Astur. andera 'heifer'	OFr andier, fr Gaul. andero 'heifer; young woman'	W anner 'heifer', Br (Leon/Corn) ounner, (Trég) annouar, (Vann) annoér 'heifer', Ir ainnir 'young woman'	-
lieue 'league (measure)'	Prov. lègo, Cat llegua, Sp legua, Pg légua, It lega	LL leucas, fr Gaul. 'league marker'	OIr líe, gen. líac 'stone', Ir liag 'stone'	-
lie 'lees, wine dregs'	Sp légamo, dial. lidia, liria, OIt led(g)a, Romansch glitta, Basq lekeda	ML liæ, fr Gaul. lĭga 'sediment'	OBr leh 'silt, deposit', Br lec'hi 'dregs', W llai 'silt, deposit'	-
loche 'loach'	Astur. lloca, Port. loca	VL laucca, fr Gaul. loukā 'light'	W llug 'shimmer, glint', OIr lúach 'bright'	-
lotte 'monkfish'	Port. lota	Gaul. lotta, literally 'flat(fish)' or 'wide(fish)'	OIr lethaid 'he extends, expands', W lledu 'to extend, expand'; OIr lethan 'wide', W llydan; W lled 'flounders', C leyth 'flounder, flat-fish'	-
luge 'sled, toboggan'	Béarn. leo, Prov lièio, Piém. leza, Rouerg leudo, leuzo; Romansch schliuza, schlieza	VL leudia, leudico (5th century), fr Gaul. sludio 'sled'	Ir slaod 'raft, float', Sc slaod 'drag, trail', OBr stloit 'dragging, sliding', Br stlej 'drag', W llithr 'glide'	-
maint 'many, much'	It mantissa, mantisa 'a little something extra', Astur manta 'quantity'	Gaul. manti	Br meñt, meñd 'multitude, greatness', W maint 'size, capacity, quantity', C myns, Ir méid, méad 'size', Sc meud, miad	-
manteau 'coat'	Basq mantar 'shirt, barque tarpaulin', Emilian mantèl 'coat'	Diminutive of OFr mante, fr LL manta, fr L mantum, mantellum, fr Gaul. mantlon 'covering'	Br malan, manal, C manal 'sheaf'	-
marne 'marl'	Sp/OIt/Ast/Port marga, Lyon margagni 'deep mud, muck', Germ Mergel	OFr marle, fr LL margila (influenced by argilla 'white clay'), fr Gaul. marga	Br marg	-
mélèze 'larch'	OProv melseca, Prov mèlze, ODauph melese, Piedmontese malëzz	OFr-Prov melese (1313), fr LL melix, -icem, merger of Gaul melissos 'honey-sweet' + Latin larix 'larch'	Sc meilise 'hedge mustard'; further to W melys 'sweet', C melys, Br milis 'honey-flavored', Ir/Sc milis 'sweet'	Latin larix (cf. FrProv (Swiss) larze, It larice)
mine 'mine'	OProv mena, Astur mena 'vein'	LL mina, fr Gaul. *mēna 'ore, mine'	W mwyn 'ore', C moen, Ir míanach 'ore'	-
molène 'mullein'	Romansch mélen, Sardinian mélinu 'yellow'	OFr moleine, influenced by mol 'soft', fr. LL melinus 'yellow', from Gaul. melinos	Br melen, W/C melyn 'yellow, mullein'	-
mouton 'sheep'	Sp mocho 'he-goat', It montone 'ram'	Gaul. *molton 'wedder'	W mollt 'ram', Br maout 'wedder', C mols 'ewe', Ir/Sc mult 'ram'	Lat. ovis
noue 'dry river bed, river flood plain'		OFr noe 'river bed', fr LL nauda 'marshland', fr Gaul., fr Proto-Celtic snauda, fr sna- 'to swim'	MIr snúad 'river'	-
obier 'guelder rose, snowball tree'	NItal (l)oppio 'guelder rose', Vegliot vaple 'maple', Astur. obleru 'thorn'	Lat. (Milan) opulus (Varro, De re rustica, 1.8.3), from Gaul. opolos 'maple'	Ogam Irish Oqoli, Irish MacOchaill (personal names)	Latin viburnum
palefroi 'palfrey, saddle horse'	Germ Pferd 'horse', Du paard 'horse'; Port vereda, Sp vereda 'pathway', Galician verea 'main road'	LL paraverēdus 'pack horse, spare horse', fr Greek para + Lat. verēdus 'post horse', fr Gaul., fr ver- 'over' + redu 'running, swift'	W gorwydd 'horse, charger'	-
petit 'small'	Prov/Cat petit, Occ pichòn, pichòt, Rum pitì 'to shrink'	ML pittitus (775), akin to LL pitinnus, pitulus 'tiny', from Gaul *pitt- 'tiny' ~ pit- 'tip, point'	Br pizh ‘meticulous; frugal, stingy’, C pyth ‘tight with money, penny-pincher’; W pid 'tapering end, tip', obsolete †piden 'penis', Br pidenn 'penis'	Latin putillus
pièce 'piece, part'	It pezza, Prov pessa, pesa, Port peça, Astur. petisa 'hopscotch'	ML petia, petium, from Gaul petsi 'thing, part', from pet 'what'	W peth 'thing', Br pez 'thing', C peyth, Ir/Sc cuid 'part'	Latin pars
pinson 'finch'	Tuscan pincióne, Port pisco Cat pinsà, Sp pinzón, pinchón	Gaul. *pincio	W pinc, Br pint	Latin fingilla (borrowed from Germanic)
quai 'wharf, embankment', chai 'cellar'	-	Normand quai and Poitevin chai, fr LL caium 'surrounding wall or hedges', fr Gaul. caio 'hedge'	W cae 'fence, hedge', Br kae, C ke	-
raie 'lynchet'	Cat. rega 'furrow', rec 'channel', Prov rega 'to furrow', Occ regon 'furrow'	OFr roie, fr Gallo-Lat. rica, fr Gaul. 'furrow'	W rhych, Br reg, Ir eitre, Sc riach	L porca (cf. Cat pórca 'land, flower bed')
rebours 'against the grain'	Prov. rebous	OFr rebors, fr LL reburrus 'swollen', from Gaul., from ro- 'very' + -borros 'stout, inflated'	W bwr 'stout, sturdy, big', C borr 'fat; protuberance, paunch', OIr borr 'swollen, inflated', Ir borr 'pride, greatness'	-
rêche 'rough, harsh'	-	OFr resque, fr Gaul. rescos 'rough'	-	-
renfrogner 'to sulk, frown, grimace'	It infrigno 'frowning', Lomb frignà 'to whimper, make a wry face'	OFr enfrogne 'wry face, wrinkled nose' and froignier 'to stick one's nose up at', both from frogne, froigne 'wry face, wrinkled nose', fr late Gaul. frogna 'nostril', from earlier srogna	W ffroen 'nose', Br froen, Ir sróine, Sc sròn	-
route 'road'	Occ rota, Sp rumbo 'course'	Gaul reda 'carriage, run'	Sc rod, Ir rodh, Br ronden	-
ruche 'hive'	Fr-Prov (Jurassien) reûtche 'bark', Prov. rusco 'bark'	OFr rusche, Gallo-Lat rūsca 'bark', fr. Gaul. rūsco	Br/C rusk, W rhisgl, Ir rusg, Sc rùsg	-
saie, sayon 'say, sagum cloak'	Sp sayo	LL sagum, saga, sagus, fr Greek ságos, fr Gaul. sagos 'coat', fr *seg- 'to hold on or together'	no direct cognates; *segno > MIr sén 'snare', W hoenyn 'snare'; *segsmen > W hemin, Ir seaman 'rivet'	-
sapin 'fir'	Norm/OFr sap, Romand sap, sab, sabs, Foréz sa, Occ (dial.) sap, Astur. sapera 'small oak'	Savoy sapin, fr Lat. sappinus, compound of Lat. pinus 'pine' and Gaul. sappus	W sybwydd 'fir', OC sibnit 'silver fir'	-
séran 'heckle, hatchel', sérancer 'to ripple flax or hemp'	Fr-Prov ceran ‘hemp comb’	OFr serans 'hemp comb', from Gaul. kērā, gen. kērans 'comb'	OIr cír 'comb', Ir cìor, Sc cìr, Manx kere, gen. kereen	-
sillon 'furrow'	Occ. selhan, Romansch saglia 'strip in a swath over which grass is strewn', Emilian sia 'space between furrows'	OFr seillon, fr silier 'to plough, till', fr Gaul *selia 'dirt mound', fr *selu 'I take away'	OIr coisle ‘to leave’, fo-coisle ‘he takes away’, do-fochsla ‘to seize, carry off’	-
soc 'ploughshare'		Gaul. soccos 'pig; ploughshare'	Ir soc 'ploughshare, snout', suig 'pig', W swch, Br souc’h', C soch' ploughshare' / W hwch Br houc’h C hogh 'pig'	Lat vomer
souche 'tree stump, tree base'	Occ soca, It zocca, Emilian cioach, Lomb çoc, Aragon zoque; Romansch tschücha, Norm chuque, Berry suche, Piedmontese süca, Sp chueca 'stump'	OFr çoche, seuche, fr late Gaul. śokka, from earlier stokka 'part, piece'	Br soc'h, C sogh obtuse, MIr tócht 'part, piece'	-
soue 'pigsty'	FrProv (Foréz) soue, souda 'pigpen'	OFr seu, soit, fr LL (Salic Law) sotem, sutem, fr late Gaul. *sucotegos, compound of succos 'pig' + tegos 'house'	no cognates, but similar formation to Ir bothigh 'cow byre', W dafaty 'sheepcot'	Lat suile 'pigpen' (cf. OFr soil 'pigsty; wild boar's wallow')
suie 'soot'	Lorr seuche, Savoy suçha, Prov suja, suga, Gasc soja, Cat sutja	LL sugia, fr Gaul. sudia	OIr súide, Ir súiche, Sc súithe, B huzel, C hudhygel, W huddugl	Lat fulliginem (cf. Sp hollín, Pg fuligem, It fuligine, Romansch fulin, Rum funingine)
talus 'embankment, slope'	Dauph. talapan 'gable', Prov. tauvero 'field border'	OFr talu, fr LL talutium, fr Gaul. talos 'brow, steep'	W tâl, taloedd, C/Br tal 'forehead, brow', OIr tal, taul 'shield boss, protrusion, hump'	-
tan 'tanbark, tan (color)'	-	Gaul. tanno 'holm oak, live oak'	Br tann 'red oak', glastann 'holm oak', OC tannen, C glastan 'holm oak', OIr caerthann 'service tree', tinne 'holly' (mod. teine 'furze, gorse')	-
tanière 'animal den, lair'	It tasso, Sp tejon badger	OFr taisniere, tesniere, fr taisse, taisson 'badger', fr VL taxo, fr Gaul. tasgō 'badger'	Sc taghan 'marten', OIr (name) Tadhg 'badger'	-
taranche 'screw bar, ratchet on a basket wine press'	Prov. tarenco, Port tranco, Sp tranca ‘cudgel, club’	Gaul. tarǐnca 'screw, nail'	OIr tairinge 'iron nail, tine', Ir tairne 'metal nail, tarrag', Sc tairnge 'nail'	-
tarière 'auger, gimlet'	OProv taraire, Romansch tareder, Sp taladro, Pg trado, Port trado,	OFr tarere, fr Lat. taratrum, fr Gaul. taratron	W taradr, Br tarar, C tarder, Ir tarachair	-
tonne 'ton', tonneau 'barrel'	Cat/Port tona	OFr tonne 'cask', fr LL tunna 'wine-skin', from Gaul. tonna 'skin, hide'	Ir tonn 'skin, hide', W ton 'skin', C ton 'surface; lawn', Br tonnen 'rind, surface, head hair'	-
triage 'forest canton'	Bourg. traige 'small pass between houses'	OFr triège 'track, trail', fr Gaul. tragos, gen. trageto 'foot'	W troed, Br troad, C troes, OIr traig, gen. traiged 'foot', Ir/Sc troigh	-
trogne 'bloated or funny face'	Piem. trugnu, Cat tronya 'brat'	Gaul. trugna 'nose, snout'	W trwyn 'nose, snout', C troen 'nose', Br stroen 'snot'	-
truand 'vagrant, beggar'	Prov truans, Sp truhan 'buffoon, jester', Port truhão, truante, Galician trogo "sadness, pity"	Gaul trugant, from trugos 'wretch'	W truan 'wretched', Sc truaghan 'wretch, miserable creature'; further to OIr tróg, Ir trogha, W/C/Br tru 'wretched'	-
truie 'sow'	Gasc/Cat troja, Occ truèja, Ligurian trœa	LL troia, fr Gaul. *trogia, from trogu 'to give birth'	W troglwyth, trollwyth 'pig litter', C godra, Br godro 'to milk', OIr trog 'birth (delivery), litter', Sc trog 'to raise, rear'	-
vandoise 'dace'	Wall vindwesse, Pic ventoise	LL vindēsia, fr Gaul. *vǐndǐsia, fr vindos 'white'	no cognates exist, but like formations do: Br gwyniad 'dace, pollan', Sc fionnag 'whiting'	-
vanneau 'lapwing'	It vannello	Gaul. vanello, venello 'swallow'	W gwennol, C/Br gwennel, Ir fáinle, Sc ainleag	-
vassal 'vassal, serf', valet 'attendant'	-	LL vassalus, diminutive of Gaul. vassos 'youth, servant', Mantuan vasal 'vassal' and valét 'vallet'	W/C gwas 'youth, page, servant', Br gwaz 'youth, vassal', MIr foss 'servant', Sc fasdadh 'rabble army'	-
vautre ‘boarhound, bearhound’	Cat guilter 'mastiff'	OFr veltre, vaultre, fr Gaul vertraha, fr vertragos, compound of ver- 'over' + tragos 'foot', ‘high-footed’, i.e. ‘fleet-footed’	OIr traig 'foot', Ir troigh, W troed, Br troad + Ir for, Br war 'over, super', W gwor-	-
vélar, vellar 'hedge mustard'	-	Gaul. vela 'ring, tendril', fr. velu 'to bend'	Ir fáil 'ring', Br gwalenn 'twig, rod; ring', OIr fillid 'he bends'	-
verne, vergne 'alder, white alder'	OProv vernha, Fr-Prov verna, Cat vern, Lomb sberna, Rouchi verne ‘draft-pole; purlin’, Liégois/Namurois vièrna ‘helm’	Gaul. vernos 'alder'	Br/W gwern, C gwernen, Ir fearn, Sc feàrna	-
virer to turn, swerve'	Sp virar	LL vīrāre, from Gaul *viru 'to deviate, veer off', from viros (see next)	W gwyro 'to shift, deviate', Br goara 'to curve'	-
virole 'ferrule (virl, verrel)'	Friul viruele	OFr virelle, fr Lat. viriola 'bracelet', diminutive of vira, viriæ, fr Gaul. viros 'round, crooked'	Ir fiar 'bent, crooked', W gwyr, C gwarr 'nape, curve', Br goar, gwar	-
vouge 'French glaive, Lochaber ax'	Occ vezoig, Bearnese bedulh, Spanish bodollo	OFr vooge, fr LL vidubium 'wood-knife', fr Gaul., compound of vidu- 'wood' and -bi(d)on 'trimmer'	Ir fiodhbha 'sickle', W gwyddif, C gwydhyv 'billhook', Br gouzifiad 'pike, boar-spear'	

== Old French ==
Old French	Cognates	Etymology	Celtic Cognates	Latin/Romance
bièvre 'beaver'	It bevero, OSp befre	LL beber (gen. bebrum), fr Gaul. bebros	Sc beabhar, W/C befer, Br (dial) bieuzr, OBr beuer	Lat. fiber, later replaced by castor (from Greek)
bresche 'honeycomb'	Occ. brusc, brus 'hive', Prov bresco ‘waffle, honey cake’, FrPrv (Swiss) brètsi 'to curdle' (< *briscare)	Gaul. *brisca, fr *briscos 'brittle'	Br bresk 'brittle, fragile', MIr brisc, Ir briosg, Sc brisg	Lat faba
bresil 'haring'	Poit brèche 'multi-colored cow', Sp breca 'pandora (mollusk)'	Gaul. *brictilo, fr briccos 'spotted'	W brithyll 'trout', C brythel 'mackerel', Br brezhell 'mackerel'; further to OIr brecc, Ir breac 'trout; multicolored', W brych 'spotted'	-
brif 'finesse, talent, style'	Old Provençal briu 'wild'	Gaul *brigos	OIr bríg 'pith, power, strength' (mod. brí 'strength, valor'), W bri 'repute, dignity, rank', Br bri 'respect', C bry 'worth'	-
bruesche 'witch'	Cat bruixa, Aragon broixa, Pg bruxa, Sp bruja	VL *bruxtia, fr Gaul brixtia, fr brixtu 'charms, spells'	MW brithron 'magic wand', Br bre 'witch, magic', breoù 'spells, charms', OIr brichtu 'spells', brigim 'to light up, illuminate', Brigit 'shining'	VL strix (OFr estrie, It striga)
Bugibus, Beugibus 'demon'	-	Gaul. bugi 'ghost, hobgoblin'	W bwcibo 'devil', C buccabo; further to W bwg, bwgan 'ghost, hobgoblin', bwci 'hobgoblin', bwgwl 'threat, fear', C boekka 'hobgoblin, imp'	-
cuter 'to hide'	Gallo cutter	Gaul. cudo 'hidden'	W cudd, C cudh, Br kuzh	-
dour 'handful'	Galician dorna, Sp duerna 'kneading trough'	Gaul durnos 'fist'	B dourn 'hand', W dwrn, Ir/OIr/OBr/C dorn, Sc dòrn	-
dun 'fortress, high place'	-	Gaul dunon	OIr dú (g. don) 'place, countryside', Ir dún, Sc dùn, W din	-
grenon 'mustache'	Pic guernon, Prov gren, Sp greña ‘tangle, (greasy) lock of hair’	Gaul grenna 'beard, mustache'	Sc greann 'beard', Ir grann 'eyelash', OIr grend 'beard, mustache', W grann 'eyelid', Br gourenn, gourren 'eyebrow'	-
guermenter 'to shout, shriek'	-	Gaul *garmon	Ir gairm 'call', W/Br garm 'shout'	-
mègue 'whey', (pl.) 'clabber, posset'	Fr dial. mégauder 'to suckle' (> mégot 'cigarette butt')	Gaul mes(i)gus	OIr medg, Ir meadhg, Sc mèag, M meaig, W maidd, C meidh, OBr meid	-
muchier 'to hide'	Norman muchi, Walloon muchî, Poitevin muçaè, Gallo muczae, Picard mucher	Gaul *mucciu 'I hide'	OIr formúchtha, for-múigthe 'smothered, concealed'	Lat celare
nâche	-	Gaul *nascā 'ring, link, band'	MIr nasc, Sc nasg 'band, tieband, collar', OIr -naisc, nascim 'I tie', Br nask ‘hindrance (physical)’, naska 'to bind'	-
nee 'girl'	Prov nada, Cat naita, OSp nado ‘son’	Gallo-Lat nata, fr Gaul gnātos, -a	MW gnawt 'relative'	-
oche, osche 'tally mark, line drawn in the dirt (to not cross)'	-	Gaul osca	W osg 'notch, scoring', Br aska 'to notch up, score'	-
osche, ouche 'enclosed land'	Prov olca, Astur huelga (> Sp), Basq elge 'field'	Gaul olca 'plowable field'	-	-
rin 'spring'	-	Gaul rino, reno	W rhewyn 'stream', Ir rían 'tide, ocean waves'	-
sesche 'rush, bulrush'	Prov sesco 'rush'	Gaul sesca 'sedge'	Ir seisg 'sedge', W hesg, C/Br hesk	-
seüs, seüz 'bloodhound'	OProv sahus, It segugio, Sp sabueso, Pg sabujo	VL segusiu, fr Gaul segusios, egusia, fr segu 'to follow'	OIr sechem 'I follow', Ir seach 'to follow', MW -hei 'seeker', OBr cnouheiat 'nutgatherer'	
seuwe 'rope'	It soga 'rope, leather band', Sp soga 'linear measure', Pg soga 'rush rope', Picard soue 'well rope or chain', Basq soka	Gaul sōca 'rope, chord'	W syg 'chain', Br sug 'harness trace', Ir suag 'rope', Sc sùgan 'straw rope'	Lat corda (cf. French chorde)
tache 'clasp, fastener (on clothing); large nail'	Prov tascoun 'peg', Galician tasca, tascón 'swingle', Sp tascar 'to nail'	Gaul tascon	-	-
tolon 'hill, highland'	-	Gaul tullo	OIr telach, tulach 'hill', W twlch 'hump, bump'	-
torce 'straw plug'	Cat torca 'distaff'	Gaul torcos 'neckring, necklace'	OIr torc, W torch, Br torchenn 'rye straw necklace'	-

== Regional and neighboring languages ==
Regional Language/Dialect	Cognates	Etymology	Celtic Cognates	Latin/Romance
Franco-Provençal abron 'sow teat'	-	a + Gaul. brondā 'breast'	W bron, C/Br bronn, OIr/Sc bruinne	-
Walloon ãcrawe 'hook salmon'	OPic ancreu 'female salmon, hook salmon', Swiss Germ Anke 'Lake Constance trout', Rhine Franconian (Rhein)anke 'Rhine salmon'	OWall ancrauwe, from LL ancoravus (4th century), from Gaul ancorago 'Rhine salmon, hook salmon', from anco 'curved, hooked' + rago 'before, in front'	akin to W anghad 'clutch, grip', craf-anc 'claw', OIr éc 'hook', écath 'fish hook'; W rhag 'before', C/Br rag	-
Prov agreno 'sloe'	Occ aranhon, Cat aranyó, Arag arañon, Esp. arándano < *agrani-dano	VL *agrīnio ~ agranio, fr. Gaul. agrīna	Ir áirne, OIr arni, Sc àirne, W eirinen, Br irin 'plum'	Latin spīnus
Fr-Prov aib 'good manners'	-	Gaul. *aiba	OIr óiph 'beauty, appearance', MIr áeb, Ir aoibh 'pleasant, humor', Sc aoibh 'civil look, cheerful face'	-
Ladin aidin 'silver fir'	-	Gaul. adlinos	MIr aidlen 'silver fir', C edhlen 'poplar', MBr ezlen	-
Poitevin amblé 'leather thill-strap'	Acadian/Saintongeais amblet, Romansh (Engadine) umblaz	OFr amblais, fr. ML amblatium (9th century), fr. Gaul. ambilation, fr. lation 'switch, rod'	W llath 'wand, stalk', Br laz 'switch, draft-pole', OIr slatt 'twig, rod', Ir/Sc slat	-
Lorrain ancenage 'sharecropping'	-	Gaul. *ande-cinga, fr ande 'intensive prefix' + cinga 'walk'	OIr cingid 'to walk', W rhygyngu 'to amble'	-
FrProv avano 'osier, withe'	Galician abanqueiro 'waterfall' (orig. 'beaver dam' < abanco + -arium)	Gaul. abanco 'dwarf; beaver'	Irish abacc 'dwarf', Welsh afanc 'beaver; dwarf', Breton avank 'dwarf; sea monster'	-
Prov bano 'horn'	-	Gaul. bannos 'top, horn, peak'	Ir beann, OIr benn, W ban 'beacon, peak', MBr ban, Br binioù 'horn pipes'	-
Romansh baràz 'bramble'	FrProv (Chablais) bara 'heap of straw or stones', Lomb bar 'bunch, tuft, bar', Galician barra 'garret, loft, upper platform'	Gaul. *barro 'tip, top'	Ir barr 'tip, summet, top', Br barr 'treelimb', barren 'bar, rod', W bar 'nail', baren 'branch'	-
Acadian bâsir 'to vanish, die'	Saintongeais basir 'to die', La Rochelle basir 'to vanish, evaporate', Provençal basi 'to faint; die'	Gaul. *bāsi	OIr bás 'death', bebais 'he died'	-
Limousin bec 'bee; bumblebee'	Emilian bega	Gaul. *becos	OIr bech, Sc beach, OW beg (W begegyr 'drone')	Latin apis (Occ abelha, OFr ef, avette)
Comtois beloce 'sloe'	Gallo belocz, Mesquerais beurlosse, Champ balosse "plum", Wal biloke, Norm bloche, Occ (Vivarois) pelorsia, Sp bugallo, Portuguese bugalha 'oak gall'	OFr belloche, beloce, from *bullucea, from Gaul. bolluca	Br bolos, polos, polotrez 'blackthorn, sloe', Ir bulos 'prune', Sc bulaistear 'wild plum'	Latin spīnus
Prov bescle 'spleen'	-	Gaul. *bistlo 'bile'	W bustl, OC bistel, Br bestl	Lat splēn (cf. OFr esplen), VL *splēnica (cf. Friul splenge, Ladin splënja, Romansh spletga)
FrProv dial. bijon 'pitch'	-	Gaul. bitu	OIr bí, gen. bíde 'pitch', Ir bigh, Sc bìth 'resin, gum, birdlime'	Latin pix (FrProv pege, Occ pega, Fr poix)
FrProv blécher, blocher 'to milk', reblochon 'soft cheese'	Hautes-Alpes bletchar, Val d'Aosta blètsì	Gaul. blegu 'I milk'	Ir blighim 'to milk', Sc bleagh; further to Ir bleacht, Sc bliochd, W blith 'cow's milk'	Lat mulgere (OFr moudre)
Valtellino briánz 'wormwood, absinth'	-	Gaul. *brigantios, from briginus 'wormwood', from brigo 'strength'	-	Lat. absinthes, VLat. aloxinum (OFr aloisne, OSp alosna, Pg losna)
Limousin/Auvergnat cairon 'chipped stone, brick'	Lyon chirat 'pile of rocks', Gasc carroc, Germ (Swiss) Karren 'boulder', Fr (Loire) jard 'sandbank full of pebbles'	Gaul. karna 'heap of rocks or stones'	MIr/Ir carn 'heap of stones', Sc càrn, W carn, Br karn	-
Romansh carmün 'stoat'	-	Gaul *carmion	-	-
Occ clot 'pit, grave'	-	Gaul *clādo	Ir cladh 'ditch, trench', W clawdd 'ditch, dyke', C kledh 'ditch, bank', Br kleuz	-
Poitevin cous 'holly'	Astur coleñu 'holly'	Gaul collis, -inos 'holly'	Ir cuilenn, W celyn, Br kelenn, C kelynn, Sc cuilionn	Lat. aquifolium (cf. FrProv agrebo, Occ agrifol)
crétir 'to fear'	-	Gaul *critu 'I quiver'	Welsh cryd 'fever', ysgryd 'shiver', egryd 'quiver', Breton krid 'spasm', skrij 'quiver', C krys 'shaking, jostling', scryth 'shiver', Irish/Scottish crith 'to tremble, quiver'	Lat. timēre
Picard (Tournais) crincher 'to winnow'	Lorrain (Gaumais) crincî 'to winnow', Lyon crincer, crinser 'to burn slowly and flamelessly'	Gaul *crienta 'chaff', fr *crei- 'to riddle, separate out'	Ir cruithneacht 'wheat'; further to OIr criathar, MBr croezr ‘riddle’, W gogrynu ‘to riddle, sift’	Vulgar Latin excutere
Prov croi 'cruel'	NItal crojo, Gal. croio 'rolling stone; hard, cruel'	OProv crois, fr Gaul. croudis 'hard'	OIr crúaid (mod. crua) 'hard', Sc cruaidh, W cru 'cruel, crude', Br kriz 'hard, rough, raw'	Lat. crūdēlis (Occ crusèl)
Dauphinois curla 'squash'	-	Gaul. *curalo ~ *cularo 'pignut'	W cylor 'truffle, pignut', Br/C keler 'pignut', Ir/Sc cùlaràn 'cucumber', OIr curar 'pignut'	Lat. cucurbita (cf. Fr courge)
FrProv daille 'billhook, scythe; spruce'	Prov daio 'reaper'	Gaul dalgo 'pin, skewer'	Ir/Sc dealg, MW dala 'sting, fang', W dal 'to fasten; fastener', C delc 'necklace', Br delioù 'pine that wordle'	Lat. falx (Fr faux, Occ falç)
FrProv darve 'mole'	Occ darbon	VLat darpus, fr Gaul darbo	-	Lat. talpa (Fr taupe)
derve 'oak'	Ouest drille, Angevin drouillard, Savoy darbo 'small fir', Romansh derbèlè 'fir forest'	OFr dervée 'oak forest', fr Gaul derva	Ir dair, Sc/Ir doire 'grove', W derw, Br derv, C derow	Lat. quercus
double 'silver fir'	Val d'Aoste dubluna 'dark wood', Germ (Swiss) Tobwald, Toppwald 'old-growth oak forest'	Gaul. dubus 'dark'; so named because the silver fir's wood blackens with age	W/C/Br du, Ir/Sc dubus	-
Comtois douraise 'openwork gate (to a fence)'	FrProv dreuze, draize, dorez, dareizi	Gaul. *doressu	OIr/Sc dorus 'doorway, gateway', Ir doras; W drws	-
Lorèze dreglio 'checkerberry (fruit of the wild service tree)'	-	Diminutive of Gaul dercos 'berry'	OIr derc 'berry', Ir/Sc dearc	-
droue, druive 'nettle', dragée 'fodder, rye grass'	Wall. drawe, Gallo dréu, Lomb droga	OFr droe, drave, from Gaul. dravoca 'darnel'	Br draweg, C drewk, W drewg	Lat. lolium
Lyon drouille 'tatter'	Dauphinois drouille 'wood shaving'	Gaul *drullia (plural)	W dryll 'fragment, small piece', Br drailhenn 'scrap, shred, strip', Sc dreall/dreoll 'door bar'	-
Walloon dûhin, dûhon 'goblin'	Ardennais dusion Lorrain dusien 'incubus', Centre duhot 'monster', Piedmontese dosseul 'devil', Romansch dischöl, döschel (> Germ (Swiss) Dusl 'misfortune'), Basque tusuri 'devil', Low German (Westphalia) Düs 'devil'	Gaul dusios	Cornish dus 'devil', Breton Diz 'devil', Irish dásachd 'madness, rage'	Late Lat. daemōn
Picard fourdraine 'sloe; blackthorn'	Lombard dresin, drèsen, dresla, dres 'briar'	Gaul *vordressi 'briar', fr dresso, -i 'briar'	OIr ferdris 'briar', driss 'bramble', Ir/Sc dris 'briar', W drysi 'briars', Br drez 'briars'	Lat. spīnus
Prov gabre 'male partridge'	Fr dial. garron	Gaul. gabro 'he-goat'	W gafr, C gaver, Br gavr, Ir/Sc gabhar	no distinction made in Latin
Lyon gêne 'pressed pomace'	-	Gaul. *jesmen	W iâs 'to seethe', MW iesin 'shining', Br go 'fermented' (< *vo-jes)	-
Pic halau 'willow'	-	Late Gaul. *halico, fr Gaul. salicos	Br haleg, W helyg, C helig, Ir saileach, Sc seileach	Latin salix (cf. OFr sauz)
FrPrv márvel, marfi 'frozen stiff, deathly pale'	Romansh marv 'stiff, numb from the cold'	Gaul. marvos 'dead'	W/Br marw, C marow, Ir/Sc marbh	-
Prov olègue 'dwarf elder'	Lomb (Bresc) òles, úles, Occ. (Garde) augué, êgou, Lyon ugo, Astur yeldu, Sp yezgo, Galic. engo, Germ Attich (dial. Adach, Ottich, Otsch), Du hadik	LL odecus, odicus, from Gaul odocos	-	Lat. ebulus (cf. Fr hièble, Occ èule, Cat évol, It ebbio)
Champenois orve 'flour'	JudFr orve 'dust', Poit louvre spark, ember', Lyon orva 'spark', Dauph orra, Occ auvo, ouvo 'ashes of plants used for fertilizer'	Gaul. *ulvos	W ulw 'dust, ashes', Sc ulbach 'ashes', Br ulv 'powder'	-
Gascon pairòu, pairòlo 'cauldron'	Old Prov par, pairol 'boiler', Lyonnais per, Catalan perol, dial. pér, Ital paiolo 'cauldron'	Gaul pario 'cauldron'	W pair, C/Br per, Ir/Sc coire	VLat caldāria (cf. Fr chaudière "heater", Sp caldera)
Picard (Tournais) roye 'cart'	-	Gaul. rēda 'four-wheeled carriage'	OIr dériad	Lat carrus
Marseilles siaisso 'high-quality, bearded wheat'	Catalan xeixa 'high-quality, bearded wheat'	OOcc saisa, fr Gaul. sassia ‘barley’	W haidd, C heydh, Br heiz	-
Lyon suiffe 'bleak (fish)'	Occ sòfia 'bleak', NItal	Gaul sofia (Polemius)	-	Latin albulus (OFr able, Fr ablette, OIt avola), alburnus (Saintonge aubourne, Cat alburn, Sp alburno)
Romansh tegia 'Alpine herdsman's hut'	Basque tegi 'house', Limousin tèi 'shepherd's hut', Varois atoi, toi, Provençal (Alpes) atei	*tegia, fr. Gaul. tegos 'house'	Ir teach, gen. tí, Sc taigh, Br/OC ti, C chi, W tŷ	-
Fr dial. tuie 'gorse, furze'	Galician toxo, Sp/Gasc toja	VL *togia, fr togion 'straw, thatch', fr togos 'roof, covering'	Ir tuighe 'thatch'; further to W/C/B to 'roof', Ir tué, Sc tugha	-

== See also ==
- History of French
- List of Spanish words of Celtic origin
- List of Galician words of Celtic origin
- List of French words of Germanic origin

== Bibliography ==
- Delamarre, Xavier. Dictionnaire de la langue gauloise: Une approche linguistique du vieux-celtique continental, 2nd edn. Paris: Errance, 2003 (1st edn. 2001).
- Deshayes, Albert. Dictionnaire étymologique du breton. Douarnenez, France: Le Chasse-Marée, 2003.
- Dottin, Georges. La langue gauloise: Grammaire, textes et glossaire, preface de François Falc'hun. Paris: C. Klincksieck, 1920 (reprint Geneva, 1985).
- Lambert, Pierre-Yves. La Langue gauloise. Paris: Errance, 1994.
- Savignac, Jean-Paul. Dictionnaire français-gaulois. Paris: La Différence, 2004.
- von Wartburg, Walther. Französisches Etymologisches Wörterbuch. 25 vols. Bonn: Klopp; Heidelberg: Carl Winter; Leipzig–Berlin: Teubner; Basel: R. G. Zbinden, 1922–67.
