= List of Galician words of Germanic origin =

This is a list of Galician words which have Germanic origin. Many of these words entered the language during the late antiquity, either as words introduced into Vulgar Latin elsewhere, or as words brought along by the Suebi who settled in Galicia in the 5th century, or by the Visigoths who annexed the Suebic Kingdom in 585. Other words were incorporated to Galician during the Middle Ages, mostly proceeding from French and Occitan languages, as both cultures had a massive impact in Galicia during the 12th and 13th centuries. More recently other words with Germanic origin have been incorporated, either directly from English or other Germanic languages, or indirectly through Spanish, Portuguese, Italian or French.

Most of these words are shared with Portuguese, presenting sometimes minor spelling or phonetic differences.

All along this article, any form with an asterisk (*) is an unattested reconstruction, being therefore hypothetical.

== Words incorporated in the Late Antiquity and High Middle Ages ==
Words exclusive to Galician, or with an early presence in local documents, have been frequently attributed to the Suebi who settled in Galicia and northern Portugal in 411, or alternatively to the Visigoths who annexed the Suebi kingdom in 585, although the later didn't settle in Galicia prior to the 8th century:

- marco "landmark" and demarcar "to mark out a property" (in local documents since 818, but in Spanish only from the 16th century),
- grano "forelock, pigtail", recorded in 561,
- escá "volume of grain" (medieval from scala "bowl", documented since the 9th century),
- feltro "felt", documented since 995,
- sá "generation" (if from medieval sala "settlement", 10th century),
- lovio "pergola", since 1009,
- laverca "skylark", since the 11th century,
- meixengra "titmouse" (13th century),
- place name boiro (and modern Galician boiro "rustic man") from medieval (10th century) burio "house, settlement",
- grova "gully, trough, trench" (10th century),
- britar "to break" (12th century),
- gabar "to praise, boast, brag",
- pouta "pows",
- luvas "gloves" (12th century),
- brétema "fog, haze, mist, drizzle",
- trigar "to hurry, rush, hasten" and triganza "promptness" (13th century),
- ouva "evil spirit, elf",
- malado "serf" (mallato, 10th century),
- trofa "lintel",
- souria "dry wind",
- esmagar "to squash",
- nifrón "whiner".

Some words were already recorded in Visigothic legal documents: tiufatus, gardingus, escancia, sagio, while some others (beyond the aforementioned) have a very early documentation in Latin documents from Galicia: varón (baro "male, man", 9th century), barragán "young, strong man" (10th century), escançan "serf (cup bearer)" (11th century), gasalian and gasaliana "companion, comrade" (9th century), saio "official" (9th century), tiufatus "commander" (10th century), roán "reddish" (raudane, 10th century in León), garda "watch" (guardia, 10th century), nastro "strip" (nastalo, 11th century, in Braga), osa "boot" (9th century), sopa "sop, soup" (soparia, 10th century), roupa "clothes" (raupa, 11th century), roubar "to rob" (raubare, 12th century), albergaria "inn" (11th century), teixón "badger" (Texunarias, first years of the 12th century), esculca "watchtower" (10th century), estaca "stake" (11th century), espora "spoor" (11th century), ganhar "to obtain", gado "cattle" (9th century), frasco "flask" (flascas, 9th century, in Asturias).

Usually, some words shared by Galician, Portuguese, Spanish, and sometimes also Catalan, Occitan or Italian, are considered of Gothic extraction: agasallar, aio, arenga, aspa, ataviar, banda, bando, barragán, bramar, brigar, brotar, casta, escanzán, escanzar, espeto, espía, espita, espora, estaca, estala, fato, gavián, gaita, galardón, ganso, garda, gardián, agasallar, gorir, grampa, grima, íngreme, látego, louzán, luva, malado, marta, rapar, rico, ripa, roán, roca, roupa, taco, tascar, teixugo, tosquiar. toldo, tregua, triscar. Other words as albergue, esculca, escuma, fresco, gañar, guerra, helmo, roubar, sopa, teixón, xabrón, which can be found in all of the Western Romance languages, are more frequently considered to be Germanic loanwords incorporated into Vulgar Latin, maybe in Gaul.

Map showing the historical linguistic context of the Iberian Peninsula during the second millennium of our era

There are a number of Germanic words which Galician shares with French, but which are unknown in Spanish; these are either nautical direct borrowings, early importations into Iberia which felt out of use in Spanish, or loans produced independently in Galician and French: gaspallar "to shatter, to trash" (French gaspailler), faísca "ashfly" (Falisca, 12th century, French flammèche), ripar "to scratch off" and ripo, ripanzo "comb" (French riper), estricar "to stretch" (Old French: estriquer), especar "to prop, to shore" (Old French esprequer), lapear "to lick" (French laper), rafar "to wear away" (Old French raffer).

There are other words of Germanic origin which are characteristically Galician, being mostly unknown in Spanish: graba "ditch, trench", íngreme, esgrevio "rough, steep", deluvar "to peel, to rub", maga "sardine's guts", gaspeto "nail", bremar "to be anxious, to fret", gulapo "gulp", rispar "to snatch, to rub", tripar, trispar "to tread", tripadela "stomp", gueste "food offered to a group of workers", estinga "stingray", espolarte "bottlenose dolphin, killer whale", falcatrúa "evil deed, treason, cheat, mischief", rampelo "thin person/horse/cow", garimar "to lend, to bring close", escarpa "splinter, thorn; rough bark (of a tree)", fouveiro "blonde", tasca "type of net", anazar "to mix something with liquids", nafre "nose" and esnafrar "to hurt one's nose".

=== Suffixes ===
At least two Germanic suffixes became productive in Galician, Portuguese and Spanish. The first one is -iskaz (medieval francisco 'French', grecisco 'Greek', alemaniscus 'German', frisiscus 'Frisian', mauriscus 'Moor'; personal names Uandaliscus 'Vandal', Uniscus 'Hun', Unisco 'Hun woman'; the second one is -ingaz, whence the Galician reguengo 'royal property' (regalengo, in the 10th century), avoengo 'property of the lineage' (abolenga, 10th century), abadengo 'monastical property' (12th century), mullerengo 'effeminate', andarengo 'swift', tourengo 'heat, mating season of the cattle', millarengo 'linnet', podenco 'hound' ...

=== List of words ===
- abetar vb. 'to err, entangle, confuse', Old Galician abete sb.m. 'trick' ('cuidou que per abete o querian envayr os seus', c. 1270), from PGmc *baitjanan 'to bait', probably through Old French abet. Cognates: Old Spanish abeitar, Old French abeter, English bait.
- afastar vb. 'to withdraw, to move away' ('e afastaron-s'afora, ca foron muit'espantados', 1264), maybe from PGmc *fastu- 'firm'.
- aio sb.m. 'tutor, protector' ('Sendericus qui huius regis aio fuit manu mea', c. 1000), from PGmc *haganan 'to feed', or else from Latin AVIA 'grandmother'. Cognates: Spanish ayo idem, OHG hagan 'to feed'.
- albergaría sb.f. 'inn' ('ad illa albergaria de loci apostolici', 1094), from PGmc *haribergō 'shelter, inn'. Cognates: Italian albergo, Occitan alberga, OHG herberga 'inn'. Derivatives: albergueiro 'innkeeper' ('albergarii, monetarii et cambiatores', 1133), albergar 'to lodge' ('e hu alberga, derei-vos o que faz:', c. 1220).
- amainar vb. 'to calm down', maino adj. 'mild, soft', maybe from PGmc *af-maginōn 'to lose strength'.
- anazar vb. 'to shake, to stir, to move, to mix', Old Galician 'to shake, drive' ('crara do ouo anaçada con vinagre et con azeite', c. 1409), from PGmc *anatjan 'to force'. Cognate of Old French anassier, Italian annizzado, OHG anazzen 'to incite; drive (by force)'.
- anca sb.m. 'hindquarter, buttock' ('et deulle hua muy grã ferida cõna lança, assy que o deribou en terra pelas ancas do caualo', 13th century), from PGmc *hanhaz 'leg, heel'. Cognates: Occitan anca 'hip', ON há-mót 'ankle-joint', OE hóh 'heel'.
- anga sb.m. 'handle', from PGmc *angōn 'thorn, hook'. Cognates: OHG ango 'hook, hinge', OE anga 'thorn, sharp point'. Derivatives: angazo 'rake'.
- arenga sb.f. 'speech'. Cognates: Italian arringa, French harangue, Occitan, Spanish arenga 'speech'.
- arpa sb.f. 'harp' ('çytolas, et vyolas, et arpas, et moytos outros estormētos', c. 1300), from PGmc *harpōn 'harp'. Cognates: French harpe, Italian Spanish Occitan arpa, ON harpa, OE hearpe, OHG harpfa id. Derivatives: arpeu 'grapnel, anchor' ('huu arpeo de ferro con seus eixos', 1433), arpón 'harpoon', farpa 'spike, nail' ('Nom se faz todo per farpar peliça?', 13th century).

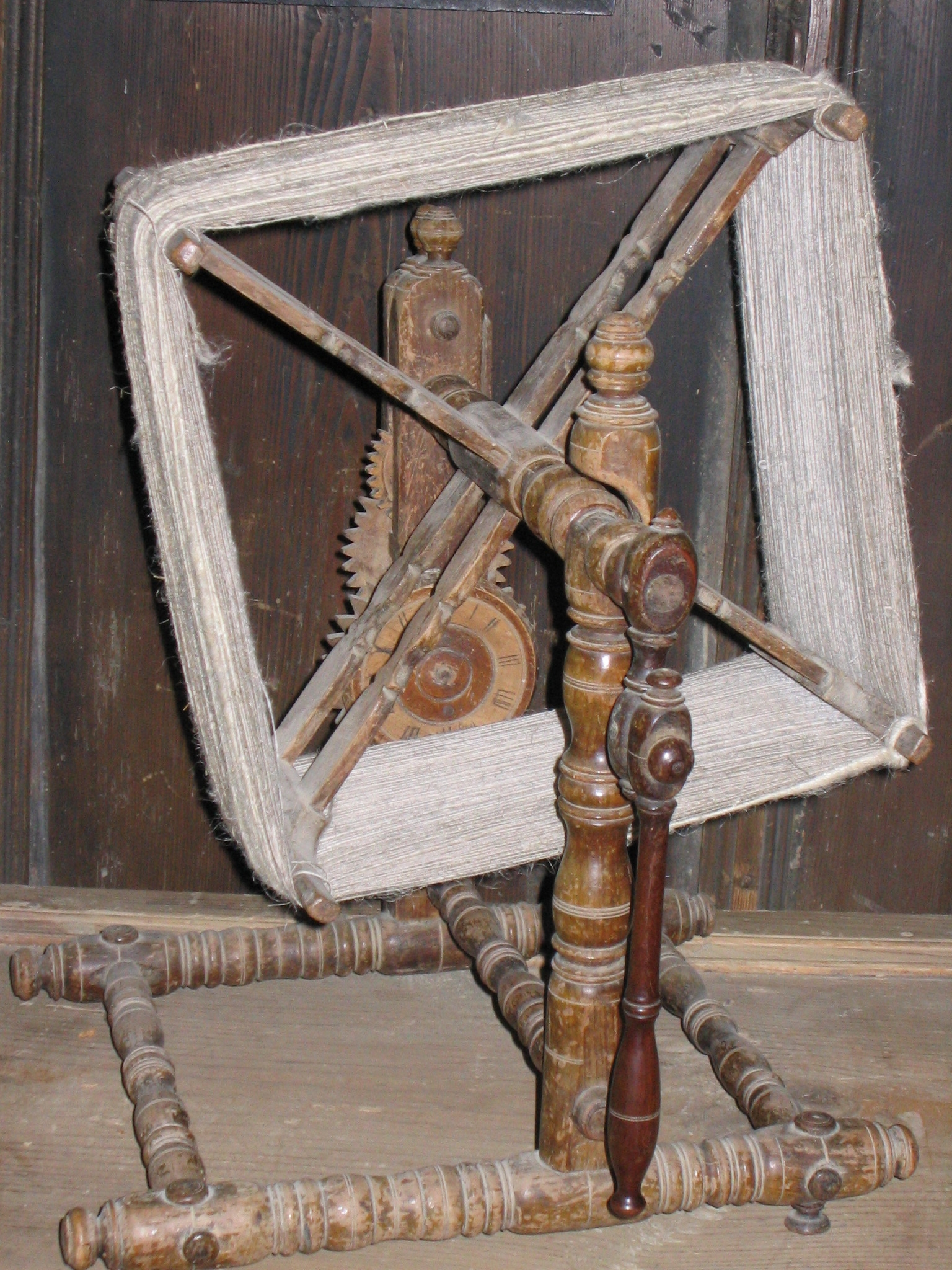
Aspa or sarillo

- aspa sb.f. 'reel, cross' (18th century), from PGmc *haspōn 'hasp, fastening'. Cognates: Italian aspo, Spanish aspa. Derivatives: aspar 'to mortify'.
- ataviar vb. 'to compose, to adorn' ('Alý chegou estonçe Achiles cõ sua caualaría, de moy bõo atabío', c. 1370), from PGmc *tawjanan 'to do, make, prepare', derived of *tawō 'hoard, armor'. Cognates: Spanish ataviar, Goth. taujan 'to do, to make', OHG zowen 'to prepare'. Derivatives: atavío 'adornment, attire'.
- braco sb.m. 'sleuth dog', from PGmc *brakka(n)- 'sleuth dog'. Cognates: Spanish braco, Occitan brac, German Bracke.
- b(r)anco sb.m. 'bench, bank' ('due mense, archa V, duo banci', 1224), from PGmc *bankiz 'bench', *bankōn 'bank, shore, bed'. Cognates: Italian, Spanish banco, French, Catalan, Occitan banc, ON bekkr, OE benc id, OHG banc 'bench'. Derivatives: bancal 'cloth, table-runner'.
- banda sb.f. bando sb.m. 'party, side' ('habeam terciam de hereditate de Bando Malo', 1151), from PGmc *bandwō 'sign'. Cognates: Italian, Spanish bando, Goth. bandwa 'sign', ON benda 'to give a sign'. Derivatives: bandaria 'partiality', abandar 'to join sides', bandada 'flock', bandear 'to shake, to wave', bandexa bandoxo 'sieve, pan'.
- banda sb.f. 'band, strip' ('et tragía hũ escudo cõ banda de azur', 1370), from PGmc *bandan 'band'. Cognates: ON band 'band, bond', French bande, Italian banda. Derivatives: bandallo 'rag'.
- barragán sb.m 'young man', barragana sb.f. 'harlot' ('habitantes homines de plebe beati Iacobi apostoli, nuncupatos barragaanes', 958), from a Gothic hypocoristic *barika, from *baraz 'man'. Akin to Nordic 'beriask' 'to fight'.
- basta sb.f. 'a basted seam' (18th century), from PGmc *bastjan 'to build, to sew'. Cognates: Spanish basta, Italian bastire 'to build', Occitan bastir, French bâtir. Derivatives: bastrán 'jointer'.
- boga sb.f. 'clamp, fetter (of a hammer)', from PGmc *baugaz 'ring'. Cognates: Spanish boga idem, Occitan bauc 'ring', Italian boga 'Hammerhülse', ON baugr OHG boug 'ring'.
- bóveda sb.f. 'vault, dome' ('ubi abbobata tribunalis est constructa', 899), from a Germanic form *bōwiþō 'dwelling', from PGmc *bōwanan 'to dwell, inhabit'. Cognates: Catalan buada, Spanish bóveda.
- brandear vb. 'to wave' ('e brandeou con lindos meneos súa bandeiriña', 1745), from PGmc *brandaz 'sword'. Cognates: It. brandire, Occ. Fr. brandir, Sp. blandir, English brandish. Galician blandir 'to wave a sword' ('log'ir-e leixou en seu cavalo branqu'e sa lança muito brandindo', 13th century) was probably taken from Occitan.
- brasa sb.f. 'ember' ('Et as casas pintadas et nobles todas forõ tornadas en brasas.', 1370), from a Germanic form *brasa. Cognates: North Italian braza, French braise, Occitan brasa, Portuguese braza. ON. brasa 'solder'. Derivatives: braseiro 'place or holder for embers', abrasar 'to burn, from scorch'.
- breca sb.f. 'cramp (muscular)', from PGmc *brekan- 'to break'.
- bregar vb. 'to knead; to shape (wood)', from PGmc *brekanan. Cognates: Spanish bregar id., Portuguese briga 'fight', English break. Derivatives: bregueiro 'shaped piece of wood'.
- bremar vb. 'to be eager, to long for' (18th century), bramar 'to roar' (18th century), from PGmc *bremmanan 'to roar'. Cognates: Old French bramer 'to scream', Italian bramare 'to long for', OE bremman 'to roar, to rage', MHG brimmen 'to roar'.

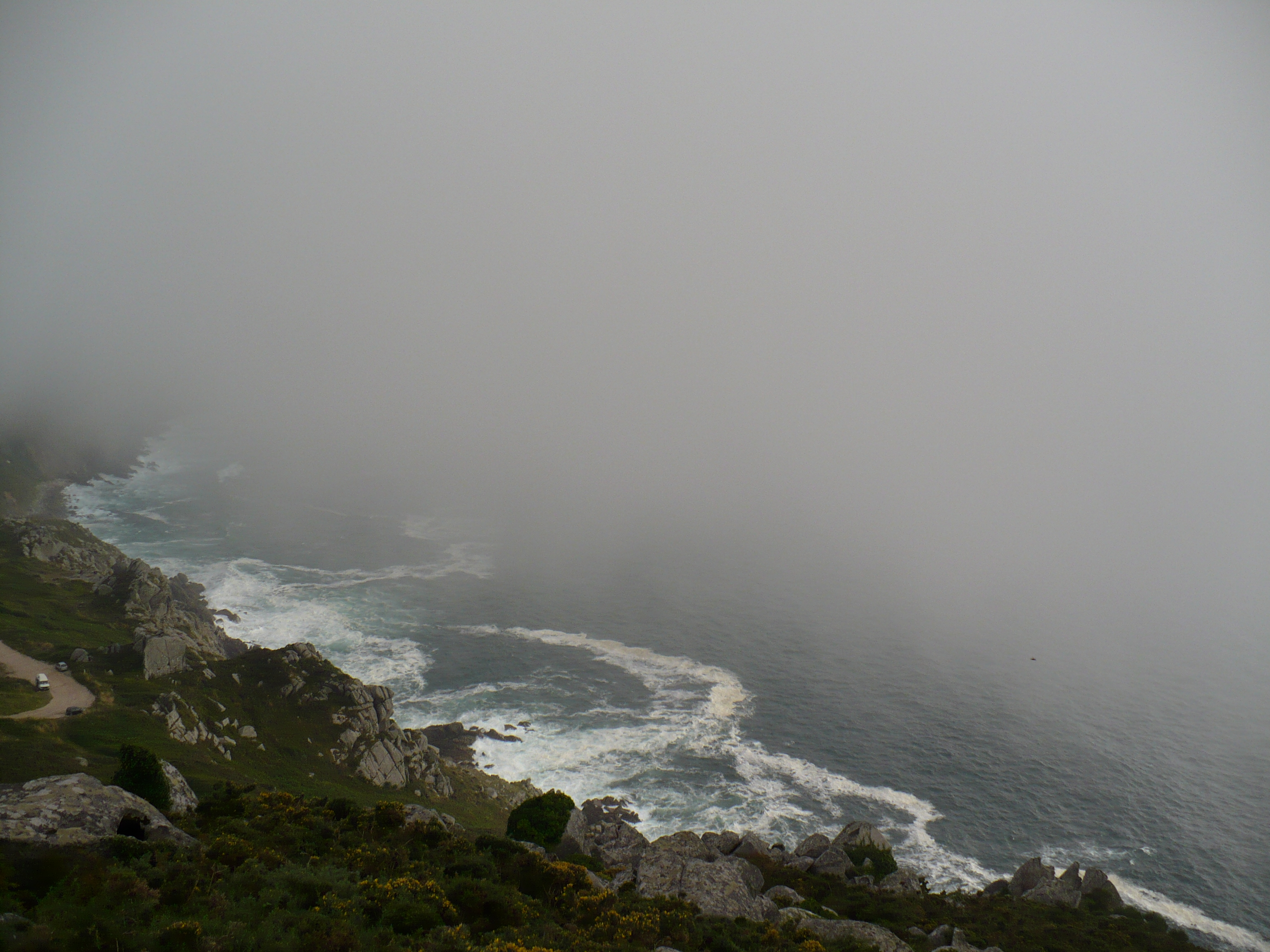
Brétema in the coast of Galicia

- brétema sb.f. 'fog, haze, mist, drizzle' (18th century), from PGmc *breþmaz 'breath, vapour'. Cognates: NHG brodem, broden 'haze, mist, breath'. No other Romance cognates. Derivatives: bretemoso, bretemizo 'foggy'; bretemada, bretemeiro 'fog'.
- britar vb. 'to break, from shatter, to labour' ('mando quod episcopus leuet cautum de illis qui illud britauerint', 12th century), from PGmc *breutanan 'to break'. Cognates: ON brjóta 'to break', OE breótan 'to bruise, to break', MHG briezen 'to bud'. No Romance cognates (aside of Portuguese). Derivatives: birta 'furrow, plot', brita, britada 'plot', brita 'gravel'.
- brodio sb.m. 'hodgepodge, broth' (18th century), from PGmc *bruþan 'broth'. Cognates: Spanish bodrio, Italian brodo, Occitan bro.
- Old Galician broslar vb 'to border, to edge' ('elles tragiã escudos de coyros et broslados de pedras preçiosas', 14th century), from PGmc *bruzdaz 'spike, edge'. Cognates: Old Italian brustare, Old French brosder, Occitan broidar.
- boiro sb.m. 'rustic man', *'house', in medieval charters burio (toponym, where it is usually interpreted as 'hamlet'), from PGmc *būran 'house, room, dwelling'. Cognates: ON būr 'chamber, pantry', OHG bur 'house', Old French buron 'hut'.
- boto adj. 'dull, blunt, snub-nosed' ('Iohannes Botus', 1251), sb.m. 'bottle-nose dolphin', maybe from Gotic bauþs 'deaf, dumb', or from *buttaz 'blunt'. Cognates: Spanish boto idem; French bot.
- brigar, bregar vb. 'to fight', brega 'fight', from PGmc *brekanan 'to break', Cognates: Gothic brikan 'to break', OE brecan, OHG brehhan idem.
- broza sb.f. 'vegetable waste, shred', bros, brosa f. 'axe' ('dineiros que me deue por huna brosa', 1427), from PGmc *burstiz 'bristle'. Cognates: French brosse 'brush', Occitan brosa 'scrub, heath', ON burst 'bristle'. Derivatives: esbrozar 'to cut (underbrush)', brosear 'to cut (a log)'.
- bucio sb.m. 'unit of dry volume', maybe from PGmc *būkaz 'body, trunk'. Cognates: ON būkr 'trunk, body', OE buc 'belly, stomach', OHG buh 'stomach', Old French buc 'torso, beehive', Catalan buc 'belly, ship hull', Spanish buque 'ship'.

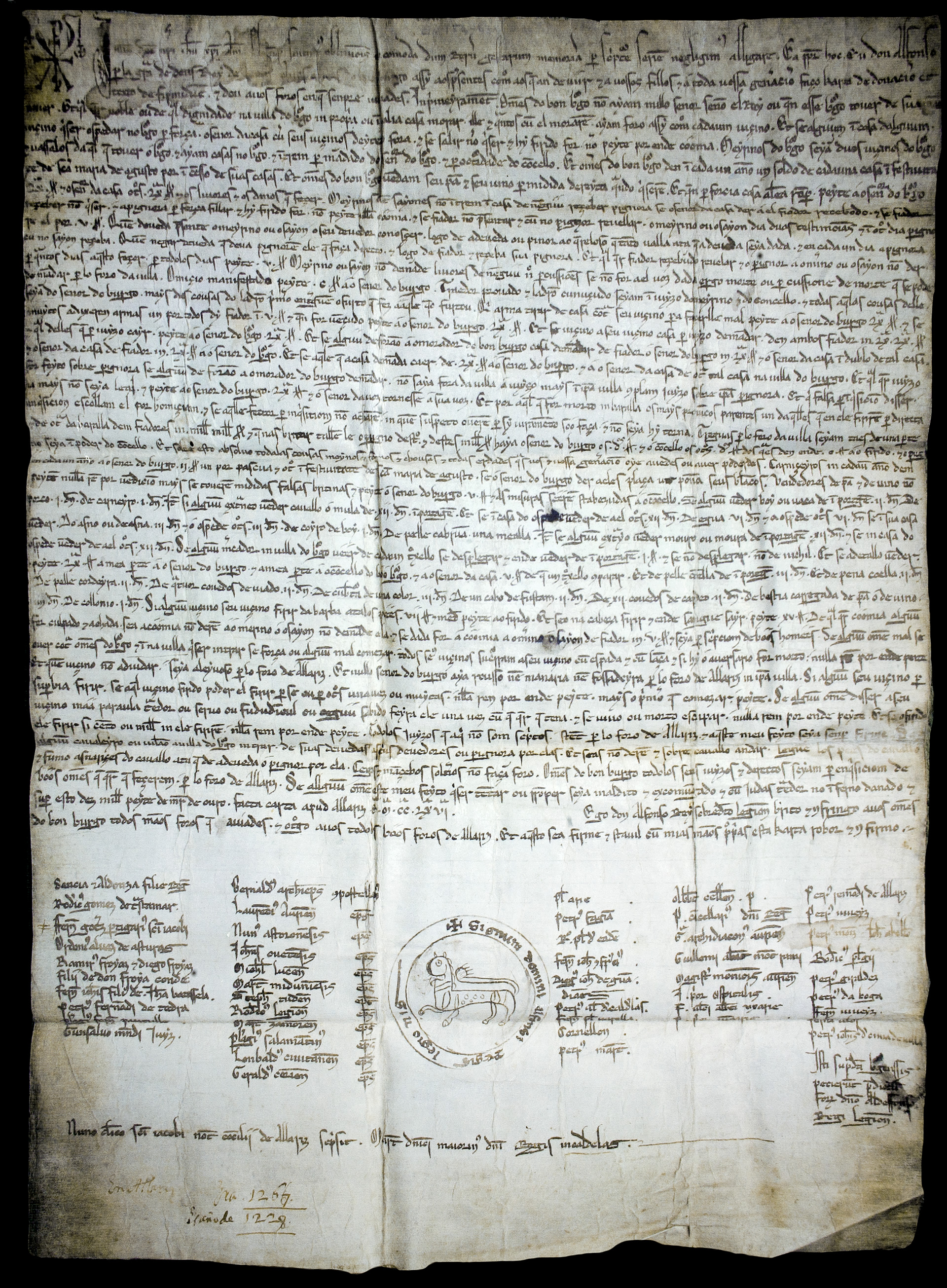
Foro or constitutional charter of 1228 of the Bo Burgo ('Good-Burg') of Castro Caldelas

- burgo sb.m. 'hillfort, (walled) town' ('et inde per pinna que dicitur Burgaria', 922), from PGmc *burgz 'castle, city'. Cognates: Goth baurgs 'castle, citadel', ON borg 'hillock, castle, city', OE bur 'fortified place, castle, city', OHG burg id., Italian borgo, French bourg. Derivatives: burgués 'citizen, landowner', burgueira 'haystack'.
- canipa 'fragment of wood', ganipo 'lock of wool', ganipón, ganifón 'tear', from PGmc *knīpanan 'to pinch', maybe through old French guenipe 'rag'. Cognates: Asturian gañipo 'rag', Dutch knippen 'to shear'. Derivatives: esganipar, esganifar 'to tear, to destroy', aganipar 'to weigh down, to trouble'.
- carpa sb.f. 'carp', from Low Latin carpam, probably from a Germanic form. Cognates: Italian carpione, Occitan escarpa, Spanish carpa.
- casta, caste sb.f. 'race' ('ata o tẽpo de casar soem séér de fria natura et casta', 1330), from a Germanic *kasts 'group of animals'. Cognates: Old English cast, Old Nordic kast 'group of animals'. Derivatives: castizo 'pure, unmixed', castizar, encastar 'to engender, to mate'.
- cerna, cerne sb.f, m. 'heartwood', from PGmc *kernōn 'kernel, nucleus'. Cognates: OHG kerno, kern id.
- coifa sb.f. 'cap; coif; headdress' ('que lle cortou o capelo et o almofre da loriga et a cofya', 13th century), maybe from PGmc *kuppaz 'head, cup'. Cognates: Rumanian coif, French coiffe, Spanish cofia.
- escá sb.f. 'unit of dry volume', from Old Galician escáá 'bowl, vase' (local Medieval Latin scala: 'scala argentea', 889), from PGmc *skēlō 'bowl'. Cognates: ON skāl OS skāla OHG scāla 'bowl'. Related to French écale 'shell, husk'.
- escanzán sb.m. 'servant, cup-bearer' ('et ipsos omines qui erant scantianes de illos rex', 1058), escanzar 'to pour' ('u foron escançadas aquestas novas', c. 1240), from PGmc *skankjanan 'to pour'. Cognates: Old French eschancier, Spanish escanciar, OE scencan 'to pour out', OHG skenken 'to give from drink, from pour'. Derivatives: Old Galician escançanía 'bureau of the domestic serfs' master'.
- Old Galician escarnir vb. 'to mock' ('quantus trobadores hy son an escarnir o infançon', c. 1250), from PGmc *skernaz 'mockery'. Cognates: Italian schernire, Old French eschernir, Occitan esquernir, escarnir, Spanish escarnir, OHD skern 'joke, farce'. Derivatives: escarnezer 'to mock' (13th century), escarño 'mockery' (13th century).
- escarpa sb.f. 'splinter, spike; rough bark', from PGmc *skarpaz 'sharp'. Cognates: Spanish escarpia 'nail', Italian scarpa 'slope', ON skarfr 'sharp', OHG skarpf 'sharp, rough', English sharp.
- escarva sb.f. 'board; splicing', from PGmc *skarbaz 'board, fragment', *skerfanan 'to gnaw'. Cognates: French écarver id, ON skarfr 'plank, board', OE sceorfan 'to gnaw, to bite'.
- escoto sb.m. 'fragment of wood, shoot', escotar vb. 'to cut off an extreme' ('muito vo-la escotaron, ca lhi talharon cabo do giron', c. 1240), maybe from PGmc *skeutanan 'to shoot'. Cognates: French écot 'stump', Occitan escot 'splinters', Gascon akutá 'to cut the branches of a tree', English shoot.
- esculcar vb. 'to spy, watch', esculca sb.m. 'watch tower, sentinel, scout' ('inter illam sculcam et Agaimi', 974), from a Germanic *skulk- 'to lurk, hide, spy'. Cognates: Norwegian skulka 'to lurk', Swedish skolka, Danish skulke 'to shirk'. Derivatives: esculcadoiro id. 'watch post' ('ad asculcadoyro de Cutios', 1100).
- escuma f. 'foam, froth' ('et tornasse escumoso o seu rrio da escuma empero que o façam as suas ondas', c. 1300), from PGmc *skūmaz 'foam'. Cognates: Norw. dial. skum OHG schūm 'foam'; It. schiuma, French écume 'foam'. Derivatives: escumadeira 'skimmer', escumar 'despumate', escumallo 'froth'.
- esmorir, esmorecer vb. 'to faint, swoon' ('O genete pois remete seu alfaraz corredor: estremece e esmorece o coteife con pavor.', c. 1240), either from Latin MORI 'I die', or related to OE smorian 'to suffocate', from PGmc *smurōn 'to suffocate'.
- esparaván adj. 'mischievous, madcap', from PGmc *sparwōn 'sparrow'. Cognates: Spanish esparván 'sparrow-hawk'.
- espenar, espiar vb. 'to end spinning (some wool)', from PGmc *spennanan 'to spin'. Cognates: English spin. Derivatives: espiallo, espenacho 'tuft'.
- espeto sb.m. gaspeto 'spit, skewer' ('habeo duas cupas minores, unum curugiol cum suo speto', 1263; 'filhou o espeto, en son d'esgremir', c. 1300), espita sb.f. 'spit, nail, spike, large needle' (19th century), from PGmc *spitan 'spear, iron pole'. Cognates: Old French espois, Spanish espeto, Norw. spit 'iron pole', OHG spiz spear. Derivatives: espetar 'to skewer, spit' ('mandou trager carne et fazer grandes espetadas della', c. 1300), espeteira 'hanger, board with spikes for hanging things', espetón 'sand lance, sand eel', gaspitadura 'wound'; espitallar 'to break into pieces'.
- espía sb.f. 'spy', espiar vb. 'to spy', probably from Occitan espia and espiar, from PGmc *spehōjanan 'to explore, peer'.
- esplecar, especar vb. 'to underpin, to shore up, to prop up' (19th century), from *exprikkare, from PGmc *prikōjanan 'to prick', maybe through Old French esprequer. Cognates: Icelandic prika, OE prician 'to prick'.
- espora sb.f. 'spur' (' III parelios de zapatas II parelios de sporas', 1074), esperón sb.m 'spoor, peak, fin' ('per illud saxum et per illud Asperon', 1128), 'to PGmc *spurōn idem. Cognates: Italian sperone, French éperon, Spanish espuela, espolón, ON spori, OE spora, OHG sporo. Derivatives: espolarte (18th century) 'bottlenose dolphin'.
- esquío, esquivo adj. 'shy, aloof, unfriendly; ferocious (Old Gal.)' ('e rogarei a Deus que sabe que vivo em tal mal e tam esquivo', c. 1240), from PGmc *skeuh(w)az 'shy'. Cognates: Old French eschiver, Occitan, Spanish esquivar 'to shun, disdain', Italian schifo 'disgusting', Catalan esquiu 'shy, brittle', English shy, German scheu. Derivatives: esquiv(i)ar vb. 'to avoid, elude' ('et que os esquiven et fazan esquivar en todo asi como escomuugados', 1339), esquivamente 'secretly, elusively' ('Et gãanarõ y muy grande algo esquiuamente', 1295).
- esquina sb.f 'corner' ('Ali jazian cavando un dia triinta obreiros so esquina dua torre', c. 1264), from PGmc *skinō 'piece, shin-bone', probably through Spanish esquina. Cognates: Occitan esquena, Spanish esquina id., English shin, German schiene. Derivatives: esquinal 'angle'.
- estaca sb.m. 'stake, pole; cape' ('per castro de Quintanela, et per valle de Staka', 1086; 'herdade do Amenal, conmo jaz entre estacas et regos', 1315), from PGmc *stakōn 'stake, pole'. Cognates: French estache, Occitan estaca, OE staca 'stake', MLG stake 'pole', MHG stache id. Derivatives: estacar 'to attach, secure', estacada 'stockade'.
- estala sb.f. 'stable; room, residence' ('et extra stallum abbatis maneant', 1206), from PGmc *staþ(u)laz 'barn, shed'. Cognates: Italian stallo 'dwelling', ON staðull 'milkingshed', OHG stadal 'barn'. Derivatives: Old Galician estaleiro 'master, supervisor' ('que o corregades a mandado do estaleyro', 1354).

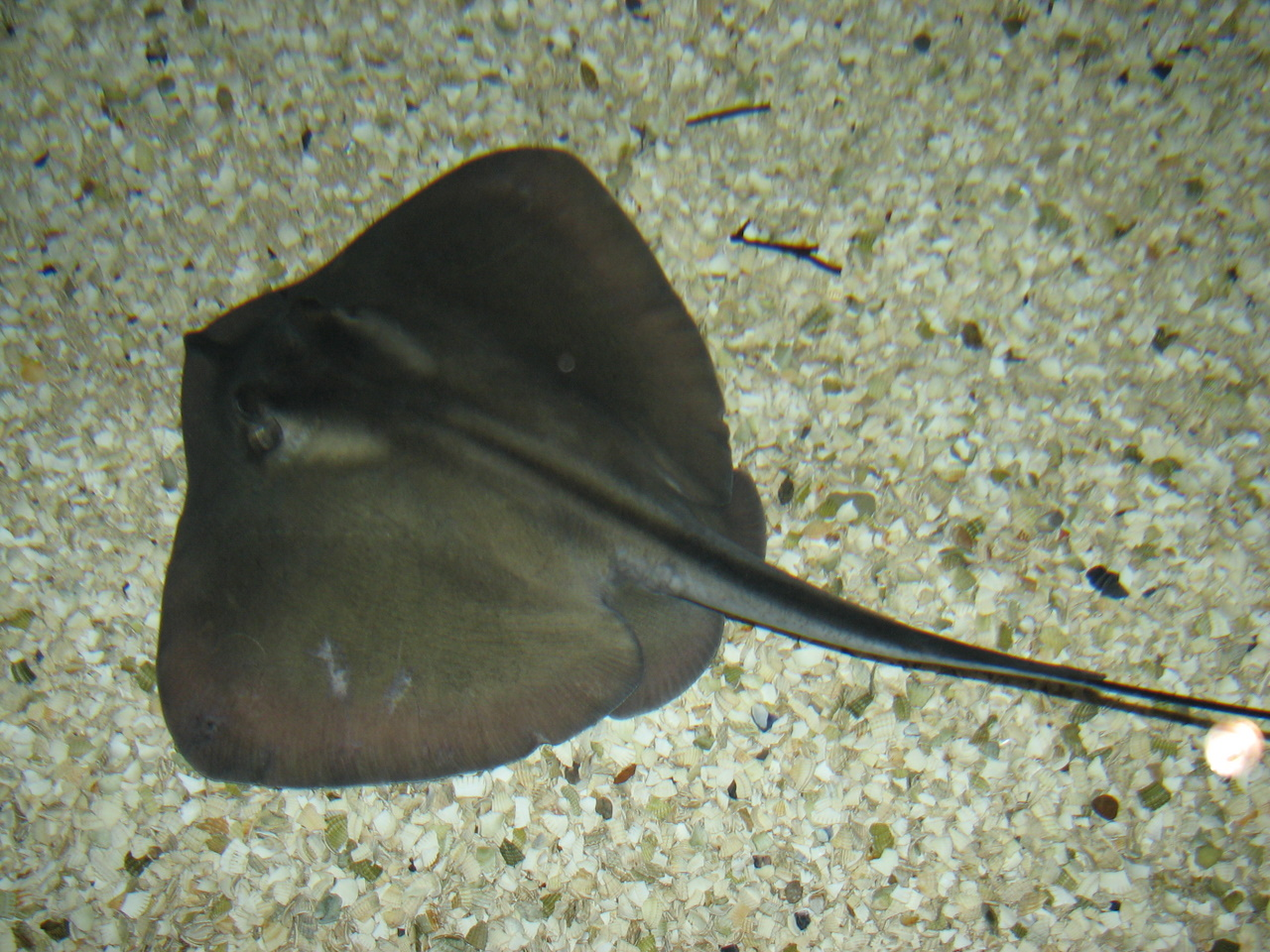
Estinga (stingray)

- estinga or tinga sb.f. 'stingray', from PGmc *stenganan 'to sting' ('de cada carga de tinga ou londana oyto dineyros', 1496). Cognates: ON stinga, OE stingan 'to sting', English stingray.
- estricar, estarricar vb. 'to stretch' ('Cál vai extricada co novo pandeiro!', 1746), from PGmc *strakkjanan 'to stretch'. Cognates: French étriqué 'tight'; Norw. strekkja 'to stretch', OHG strecken, OE streccan idem.

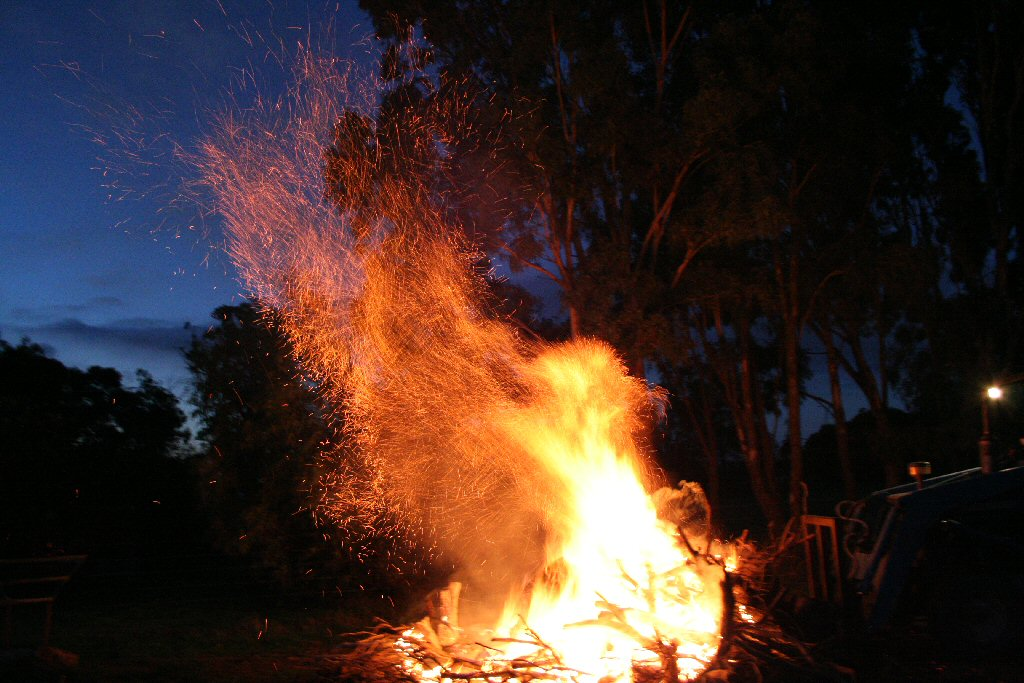
Faíscas (embers)

- faísca sb.f. 'ash fly, embers', from old falisca (Falisca, 1173), from PGmc *falwiskō(n). Cognates: Asturian falisca 'snowflake', Old Italian falavesca, French flammèche, ON folski, OHG falawisca 'embers'. Derivatives: faiscar 'to spark; to drizzle (fig.)'.
- falcón sb.m. 'falcon' ('tibi Adefonso meo falconario', 1189), from PGmc *falkōn idem. Cognates: Italian falco, French faucon, Spanish halcon, OHG falco. Derivatives: falcatrua ' evil deed, treason, cheat, mischief', falcoeiro 'falcon breeder'.
- faldra sb.f. 'skirt, folds' ('et çingeu bẽ suas vestiduras, et alçou suas faldas', 14th century), from PGmc *fald- 'fold'. Cognates: Italian falda, Occitan fauda, ON feldr 'cloak', OE fyld 'fold'. Derivatives faldriqueira 'fob', faldrocas 'slovenly'.
- fananco sb.m. 'marsh plant' (18th century), from PGmc *fanjan 'fen, marsh'. Related to French fange, Occitan fanha, ON fen, OHG fenni 'fen, marsh, wet meadow'.
- fato sb.m. 'group of persons, animals or things; belongings' ('Jupiter se fezo caudillo da grey -et grey se entende aqui por ovellas ou grey de fato dellas', 14th century), from PGmc *fatan 'cloth'. Cognates: Portuguese fato 'suit, clothes, group', ON fat 'clothes, dress', OHG fazza or faz 'a bundle', cf. Swed. fate-bur 'store-house'. Derivatives: fatada, fatuxo 'group, set'.
- feltro sb.m. 'felt' ('liteira, uenabes, laneas et feltra, et omnem intrinsecam domorum', 995), from PGmc *feltaz 'felt'. Cognates: Italian feltro, Occitan feutre, Spanish fieltro, OE felt OHG filz 'felt'. Derivatives: filtrar 'to filter'.
- fouveiro adj. 'bay (horse)', from PGmc *falwaz 'fallow, yellow'. Cognates: Old Italian falbo, French fauve, OE fealu 'fallow, yellow', OHG falo 'pale, reddish yellow'.
- frasco sb.m. 'flask' (18th century), from PGmc *flaskōn. Cognates: Italian flasca, French flacon, Occitan flascó, ON flaska 'flask', OE flaxe, OHG flasca.
- francada sb.f. or 'francado sb.m. 'fishing gig' (18th century), from PGmc *frankōn 'lance, javelin, dart'. Cognates: Spanish francado (Santander), ON frakka, OE franca.
- fresco adj. 'fresh' ('XL tructas frescas', 1225), from PGmc *friskaz. Cognates: Italian fresco, French frais, Occitan fresc, Spanish fresco, English fresh, ON ferskr, OHG frisc id. Derivatives: refrescar 'to freshen', frescura 'freshness', fresqueira 'ice box', fresquío 'type of smell (fresh meat)'.
- fromeira sb.f. 'warehouse, deposit', from PGmc *frumīn 'usefulness', maybe through Old French formir, Occitan fromir 'to contribute'. Cognates: Italian frummire, OS frumī 'usefulness'.
- gabar vb. 'to praise, boast, brag' ('pero se muyto andava gabando', 13th century), gabo 'conceit, boastfullness' (13th century) maybe from Old French gaber 'to tell jokes', from Old Nordic gabb 'mockery'. Cognates: MDutch gabben 'to mock'.

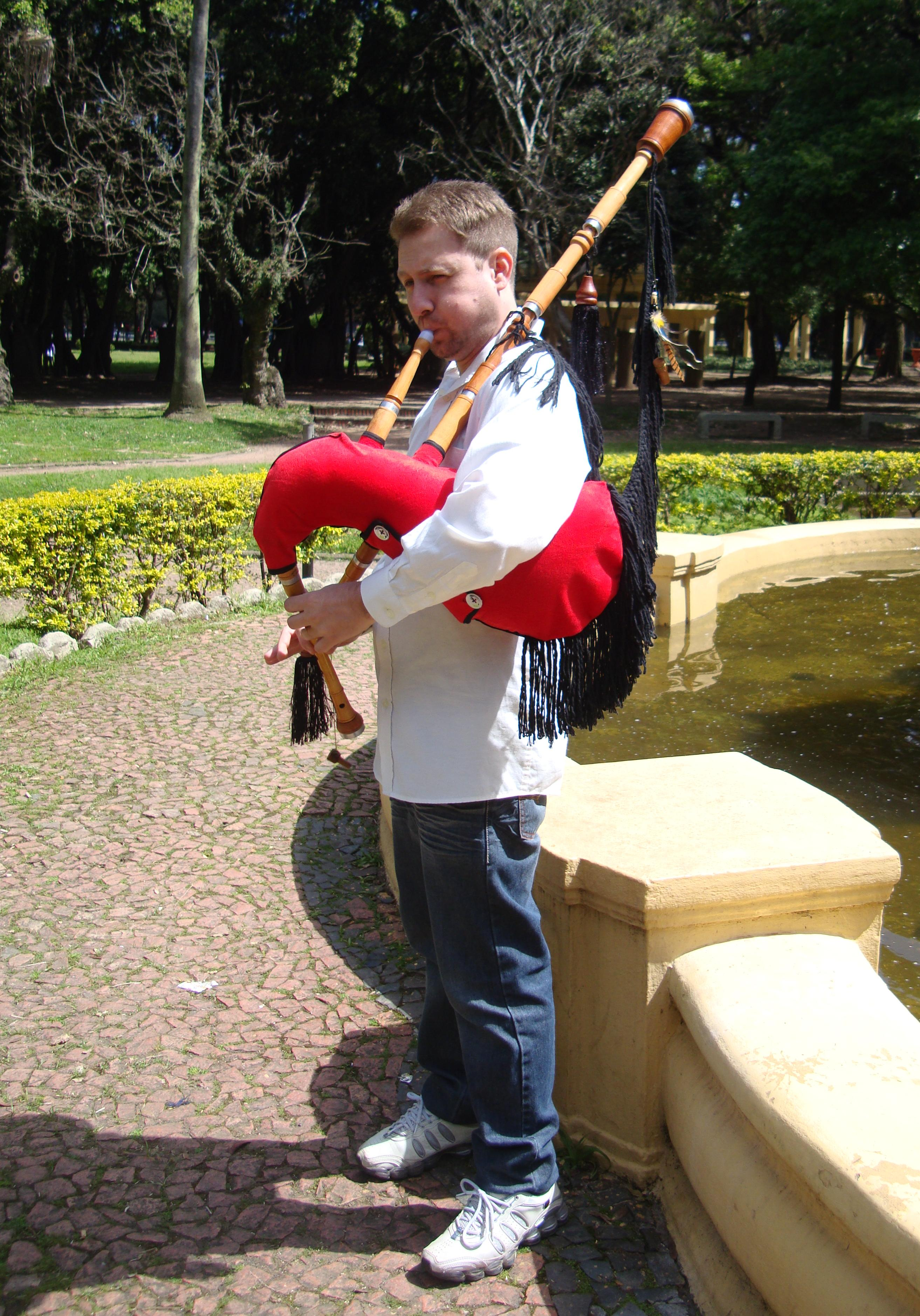
A gaiteiro playing a gaita (bagpipe)

- gaita sb.f. 'bagpipe', from PGmc *gaitz 'goat'. Cognates: Goth gaits 'she-goat', ON geit, OE gát, OHG geiz. Derivatives: gaiteiro 'bagpiper'.
- galardón sb.m. 'reward' ('a Virgen santa dá bon gualardon aos seus que torto prenden', c. 1264), from PGmc *wiþra-launan 'counter-payment'. Cognates: Italian guiderdone, Occitan guierdó, Old French gueredon, Catalan guardó, Spanish galardón, Old Dutch witherlōn, OE witherléan 'reward'. Derivatives: galardoar 'to reward'.
- galdrapa sb.f. 'rag, tatter' Old Galician 'rich cloth' ('E prometeu-m'el ũa bõa capa, ca nom destas maas feitas de luito, mais outra bõa, feita de gualdrapa, cintada, e de nom pouco nem muito', 13th century), related to Bavarian waltrappen 'saddle cloth'. Cognates: Spanish gualdrapa, Italian gualdràppa 'saddle cloth'. Derivatives: galdrapeiro, galdrupeiro 'crook', galdaripo 'a crested bird'.

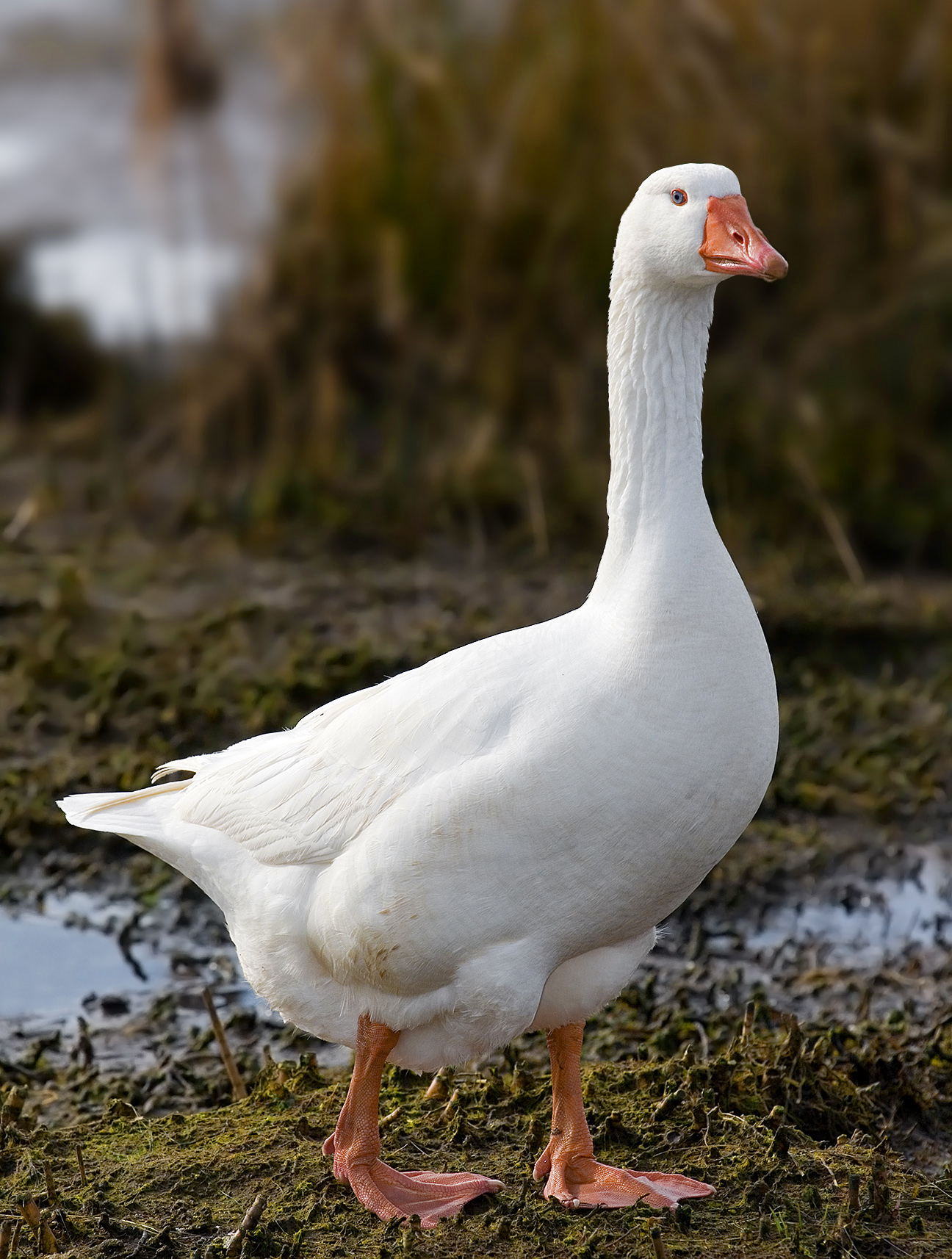
Ganso (gander or goose)

- ganso sb.m. 'gander' ('Johan Ganso', 1315), from PGmc *gansz 'goose'. Cognates: German gans, English goose.
- gañar vb. 'to gain' ('de omnia quicquid ganabi uel ganare potuero', 818), from the interference of a Gothic *ganan, from PGmc *ganōjanan 'to gape, glare > *to covet > to gain', and Old French gaaignier 'to gain', from PGmc *waiþjanan 'to hunt, graze, catch'. Cognates: French gagner, Italian guadagnare, Occitan guadanhar, Catalan ganyar, ON veiða 'to catch, hunt', OE wæðan 'to hunt', OHG weidōn 'to graze'. Derivatives: ga(n)do 'cattle', gadaña 'hoe, scythe'.
- gardar vb. 'to guard, watch, protect' ('unde ipsi inimici illa guardia eicierant', 936), from PGmc *wardōjanan. Cognates: Italian guardare, French garder, Occitan, Spanish guardar, Catalan gordar, ON varða, OE weardian 'to guard, defend', OFris wardia 'to wait', OHG wartēn 'to wait, peer'. Derivatives: agardar 'to wait, to observe, to fulfil'; gardián, garda 'watcher, warden, guard'; garda 'defence'; gardarroupa 'wardrobe' ('guardaroupa', 1326).
- Old Galician gasalian sb.m. 'companion' ('sca. Maria de Vilarino quam fecit Romanus cum suis gasalianis', 830) gasaliana sb.f. 'wife' ('una pariter cum nostra gasaliane', 952), from PGmc *ga- 'with' and *saliz 'house, hall'. Cognates: Spanish agasajar, Occitan gazalha 'company', OHG gisello 'comrade'. Derivatives: gasalla 'shared pastures', agasallar 'treat kindly, regale', agasallo 'consideration, kindness, present', gasallado 'welcome'.
- gaspallar vb. 'to break, to tear, to shred, to crumble', gaspallo sb.m. 'fragment, straw', probably from Old French gaspailler, from PGmc *spelþjanan 'to spoil, to waste, to destroy.'. Cognates: ON spilla 'to spoil, to destroy', OHG spilden 'to waste'.
- gavián sb.m. 'sparrow-hawk' ('un gavian que deo o prior', c. 1261), from PGmc *gablō 'fork'. Cognates: Spanish gavilán idem, OGH gabala 'fork'.
- graba sb.f. 'ditch, trench' (18th century), from PGmc *grabōn id. Cognates: Goth. graba id, ON graf 'hole, pit', OE græf 'grave, trench', OHG grab 'grave'.
- grampa sb.f. 'cramp', garapio sb.m. 'pitchfork', garapelo sb.m. 'sheaf, truss, garapaldo, grapuada 'shove', 'from PGmc *klampjanan 'to clench'. Cognates: Spanish grampa id., Italian grampa 'claw', French grapon 'crooked hand', Occitan grapin 'grapnel', ON kreppa 'to clench'. Derivatives: garampallo 'stick'.
- grañón adj. 'bearded', anciently sb.m. 'moustache' ('tam bem barvado, e o granhon ben feito', 1371), from a Germanic form granō 'lock of hair, pigtail, tress' first documented in a Latin Galician-Suevic document (acts of the first Council of Braga, 561): 'Item placuit ut lectores in ecclesia in habitu saeculari ordinati, non psallant neque granos gentili ritu dimittant' ('Also, it was decided that those ordained as lectores shall not sing the psalms in the church if they are dressed with secular habits, nor if they don't renounce to wear granos after the manner of the heathen'). Cognates: ON gron, OE granu id., OHG gran, id.
- grepe sb.m. 'trap for birds', from PGmc *grippōn- 'to grasp'.
- grima sb.f. 'fright, fear, horror; annoyance' (18th century), from PGmc *gremmaz 'grim'. Cognates: Occitan grima 'sadness', Spanish, Catalan grima 'shiver, horror', ON grimmr 'grim, stern', OHG grim id. Derivatives: grimoso 'annoying, disgusting', agrimar 'to scare'.
- griñir vb. 'to grunt, whine, whimper' (18th century), from PGmc *grīnanan 'to pout, grin, whine'. Old French grignier, Italian digrignare 'to bare one's teeth', Occitan grinar 'grunt, growl',
- grova sb.f. 'gully, trough, trench' ('ex alia parte villa de grovas', 993), from PGmc *grōbō 'hole'. Cognates: Goth groba 'dugout, hole', ON grōf 'pit', OHG gruoba id.
- grumar, esgrumar vb. 'to crumble, crush' (19th century), from *exkrumare, from PGmc *krumōn 'crumb, fragment'. Cognates: Old French esgrumer, Occitan, Catalan esgrumar idem; Icelandic krumr 'intestines', OE cruma 'crumb, fragment'. Derivatives: esgrumizar idem., engrumar 'to assemble pieces together', degrumar 'to crush, twist'.

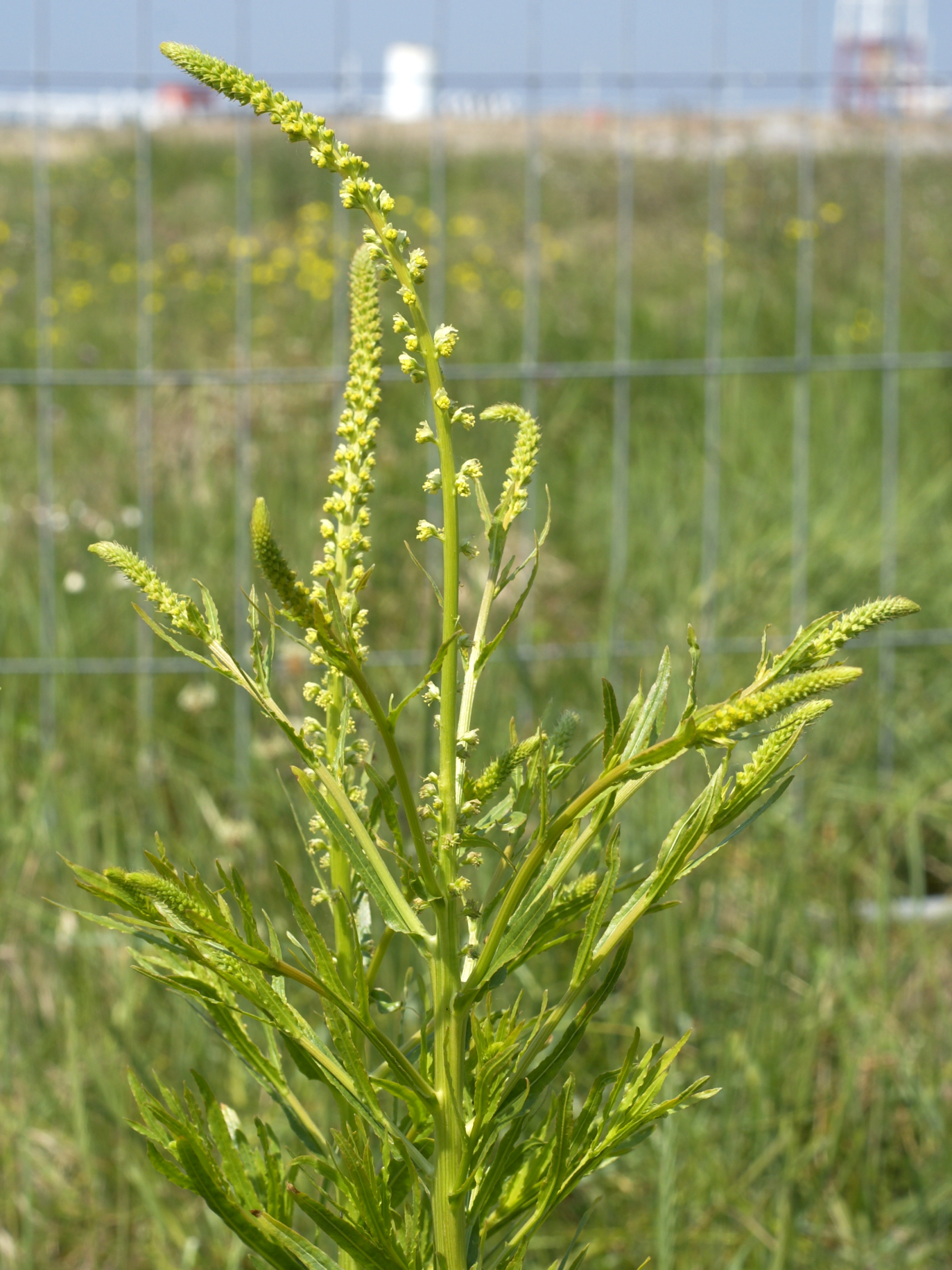
Goldra (weld)

- gualdra, goldra sb.m. 'Reseda luteola' (1745), to PGmc *walþō id. Cognates: French gaude, Spanish gualda, ME welde 'weld, Reseda luteola', MDu wolde id. Derivatives: goldra, goldracha, goldromada 'dirt, grime (dyewoks)', goldrar 'to dye, tan', goldrón 'dyer, tanner', goldro 'dirty water'.
- Old Galician guarir, gorir vb 'to dwell, protect, cure, escape, save, to make a living' ('e ora ja mays guarido se sente', 13th century), from PGmc *warōjanan 'to ward, protect'. Cognates: Italian guarire, French guérir, Occitan garir, Catalan gorir, Spanish guarir, ON vara 'to beware, warn', OE warian 'to guard', OFris waria 'to protect'. Derivatives: guarecer, gorecer idem; guarida 'lair'; garita, gorita (from French garite) 'sentry box'; garimento 'protection' ('por muito bem & por muyto garimento que me fezestes', 1256).
- Old Galician guarnir, gornir vb. 'to garnish, equip, provide, protect' ('e nós de chufas guarnidos seremos', c. 1220), from PGmc *warnōjanan. Cognates: Italian guarnire, French garnir, Occitan, Catalan gornir, Spanish, Portuguese guarnecer, OHG warnōn 'to equip, to instruct'. Derivatives: guarnicion (que llj passou todalas guarnições, c. 1295).
- guedella (alternative spelling guedelha) sb.f. 'lock' ('alçouse al rrey hũa guedella et parouxillj dereyta', 1295), from PGmc *wiþjōn 'with, thong, cord', influencing Latin VITICULA 'little vine'. Cognates: Spanish guedeja, Portuguese gadelha. Derivatives: guedelludo 'long-haired man'.
- gueifa sb.f., gueifón sb.m. 'mouldboard', from PGmc *waibjanan. Goth. bi-waibjan 'to surround', ON veifa 'to wave, vibrate', OE wæfan 'to wrap up, clothe', Mu weiven 'to be in swinging movement', OHG zi-weiben 'to scatter', Old Italian aggueffare 'to enclose'.
- guerra sb.f. 'war', from PGmc *werzaz 'war, confusion' ('excepto quando fuit guerra et tulerunt inde aliquid Mali reges', 1019). Cognates: Italian guerra, French guerre, Occitan, Spanish guerra, MND werre. Derivatives: guerreiro 'warrior' ('uobis domino Guerrario de toto meo regalengo', 1162), guerrilleiro 'guerilla warrior' (from Spanish guerrilla), guerrear 'to struggle'.
- gueste sb.f. 'food offered as part of the payment of a group of workers', from PGmc *westiz 'food, provisions'. Cognates: ON vist, OE wist, OHG wist 'food, provisions'.
- guía sb.f. 'guide' ('per mar an estrela guia', c. 1264), probably from a Gothic *widan 'leader, guide'. Cognates: Italian guida, Occitan guiza, Catalan, Spanish guia. Derivatives: guiar 'to guide'.
- guisa sb.f. 'manner, way', to PGmc *wīsōn idem ('non sei osmar guisa nen razon', c. 1220). Cognates: Italian guisa, French guise, Occitan guiza, Spanish guisa, ON vísa 'strophe', OE wíse 'way, manner', OHG wīsa id. Derivatives: guisar 'to cook, spice', guiso 'stew'.
- helmo sb.m. 'helm' ('et scutum et lanceam et spatam et loricam et elmum et genolarias', 12th century), from PGmc *helmaz 'helmet'. Cognates: Spanish yelmo, Italian elmo, Old French heaume, Goth hilms, ON hjálmr, OE helm, OHG helm id.
- ingreme adj. 'steep, difficult', engremar vb. 'to twitch', gramar vb. 'kneading', esgremio adj. 'sour, rough', maybe from PGmc *gramjanan 'to anger, to provoke', *gremmaz 'grim, stern, sharp, bitter'. Cognates: Italian gramare, Old French engramir, Goth gramjan 'to anger, to provoke', OHG gremmen idem, OE grim 'sharp, bitter, fierce, grim'.
- lapear, galapear vb. 'to lick, slurp' (18th century), from PGmc *lapjanan 'to lick'. or alternatively, from a common onomatopoeic origin. Cognates: French laper, Catalan llepar, Icel. lepjan 'to lick', OHG gilepphen 'to ladle, to scoop', Swed. dialectal glapa 'to gulp down'. Derivatives: lapo 'spittle', lapa-caldos lapón 'glutton', gulapo 'gulp'.
- lata sb.f. 'board, plank; tin' ('deuedes a poer en forca et en latas toda a dita vinna', 1331), either from PGmc *laþþ- 'plank', or from Celtic. Cognates: Fr. latte, Occ. Sp. lata, Italian latta, OHG latta. Derivatives: latizo 'rod', latado 'plank floor',
- látego sb.m. 'whip', from PGmc *laidō 'way' e *teuhanan 'to bring, to guide'. Cognates: Spanish látigo, OE láttéh 'leading-rein'.

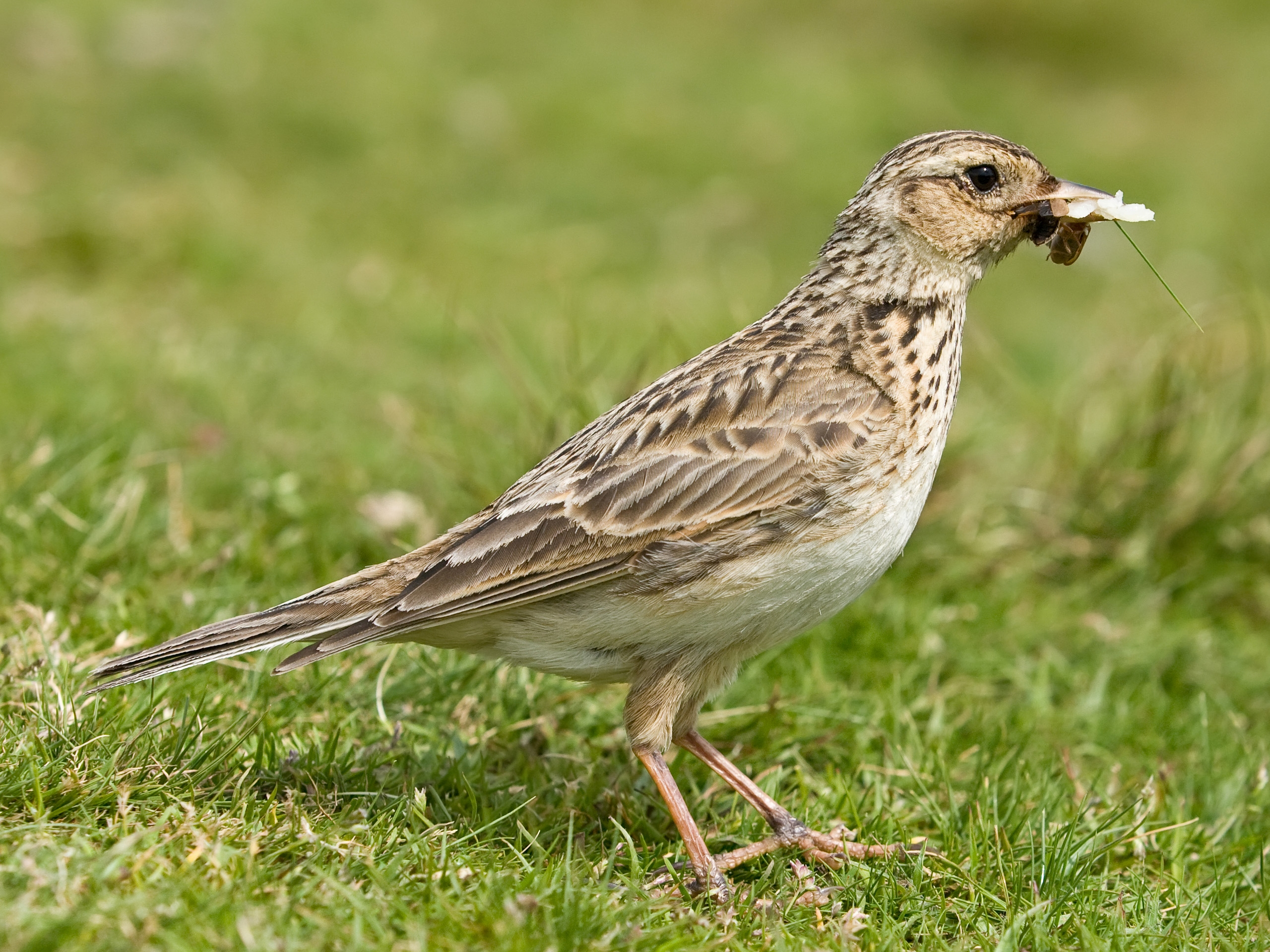
Laverca (skylark)

- laverca sb.f. 'lark > smart; chatty' ('et inde ad uilar que dicent lauercos', 1059), from PGmc *laiwazikōn. Cognates OSwed loerikia, ON lævirki, OE lāwerce, NFris lask, OS lewerka, OHG lerihha 'lark'. This word has no cognates in other Romance languages (except for Portuguese).
- leme sb.m. 'rudder' (18th century), from PGmc *liman 'limb, branch'. Cognates: ON lim 'foliage, branch', OE lim 'member, limb, branch'.
- lista sb.f. 'strip, list' ('hũ pano moy bõo et moy preçado, a listas d'ouro muy fremosas', 14th century), from PGmc *līstōn 'ledge'. Cognates: Ital. listr(r)a, Occitan, Spanish lista, ON lista 'edge', OE líste 'list, hem, border', OHG lìsta 'edge'. Derivatives: listón 'lath', alistar 'to lay out, from put on a list'.

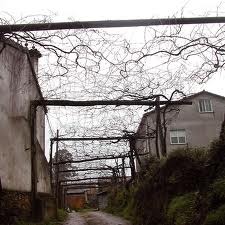
Lobio (vine bower)

- lobio sb.m. 'vine bower' ('in alio loco super casa de Bellendo illo lovio cum sua vinea', 10th century), from PGmc *lauban 'foliage'. Cognates: Lombard lobia, French loge, Occitan laupia, 'bower, pergola'.
- louzán adj. 'fresh, vigorous' ('ego Petrus Lauciano', 1190), maybe from Gothic flauts 'boastful'. Coganates: Spanish lozano, Pt.. loução.

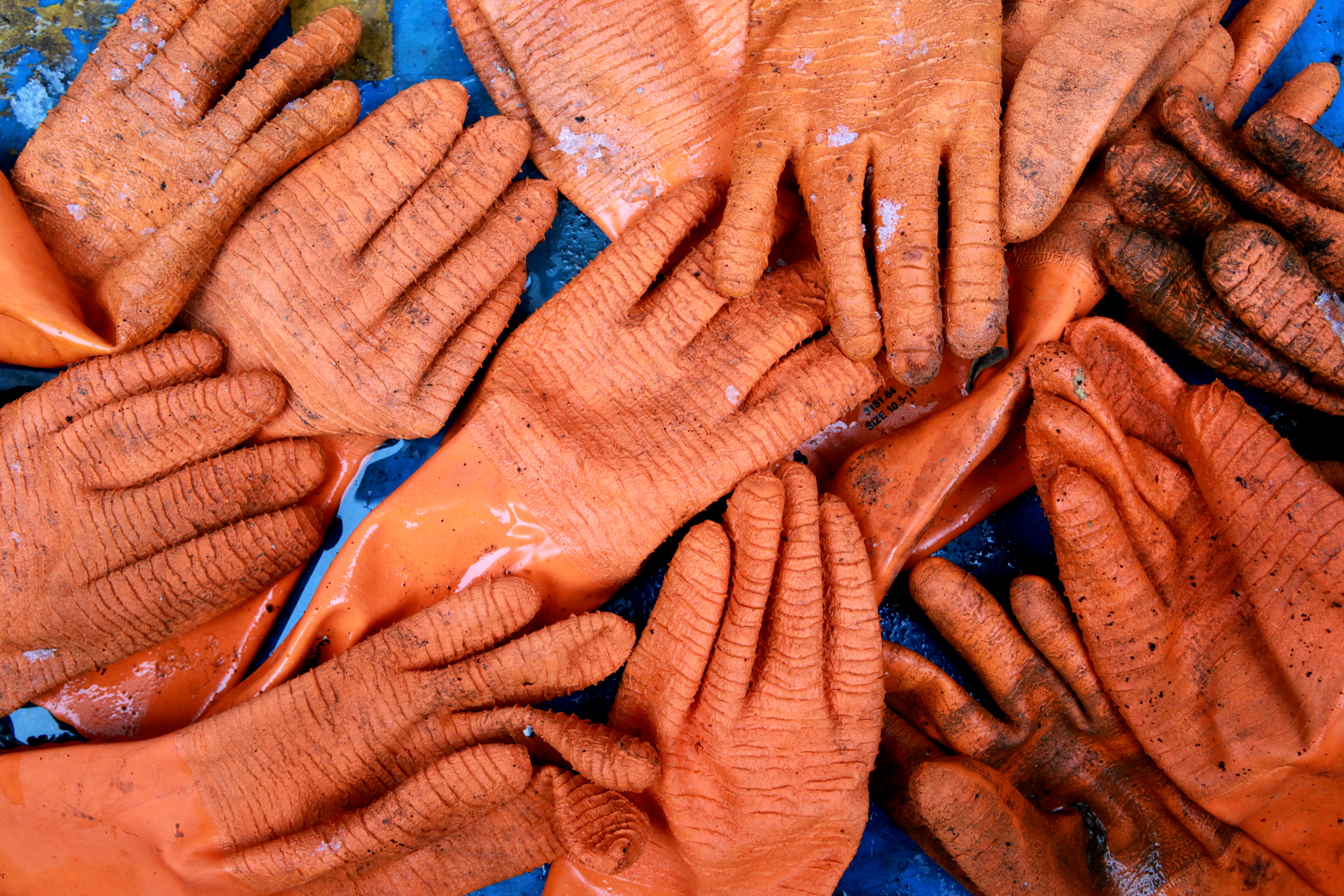
Luvas (gloves)

- luvas sb.f. 'gloves' ('et accepimus pro inde roboracione unas luvas', 1183), from PGmc *glofōn id. Cognates: Spanish lúa, ON glōfi, OE glōf id. Derivatives: deluvar 'to peel, to rub'.
- maga f. 'guts, insides (of fish)' ('non debent facere sagimen nisi de capitibus et de maga sardinarum', 1231), from PGmc *magōn. Cognates: Old Italian magone 'goitre', French mague 'stomach', ON magi, OE maga, OHG mago 'stomach'. Derivatives: magueiro 'press for the production of fish oil' ('magueyro', 1496); esmagar, amagar 'to crush, to squash'.
- Old Galician malado/a sb.m/f. 'servant' ('direxerunt ad regem ad Legionem suo mallato Bera', 934), maybe from PGmc *maþlan 'marker-place, assembly', *maþlōn 'female acquaintance'.
- marca sb.f. 'half-pound of silver' ('et accipio de gazofilatio beate Marie marcas argenti Cm', 1112), from PGmc *markō id. Cognatos:
- marco sb.m. 'mark, landmark, boundary stone' ('per alium carralem antiquum et inde per marcos et signales', 818), from PGmc *markan 'mark, landmark', *markō 'boundary'. Cognates: Italian marco 'character', French marche 'boundary', ON mark 'mark, landmark', OHG marc id. Derivatives: marcar 'to mark out; to mark' ('sicut est marcata per suos terminos', 958), demarcar 'to mark out, demarcate' ('sicuti iam designavimus et demarcavimus', 936), comarca 'region, shire' ('é Patriarcha daquela terra e á en pode-la comarca', 13th century).
- marrar 'to fail, err; to lack' ('Et Rrulan meteu mão an espada, et en coydandoo de matar, marroo, et doulle ẽno caualo et partio por meo', 1390), from PGmc *marzjanan 'to hinder'. Cognates: French marrir 'grieve', Catalan marrar 'to fail, to get lost', Goth. marzjan 'to anger', OE mierran 'to hinder', OHG merren id. Derivatives: marra 'lack, shortage'.
- marta sb.f. 'marten' ('e da pelica da marta, hua branca, et da lontra, dous diñeiros', 1439), from PGmc *marþuz id. Cognates: Occitan mart 'marten', OE meard id., MHG mart id.

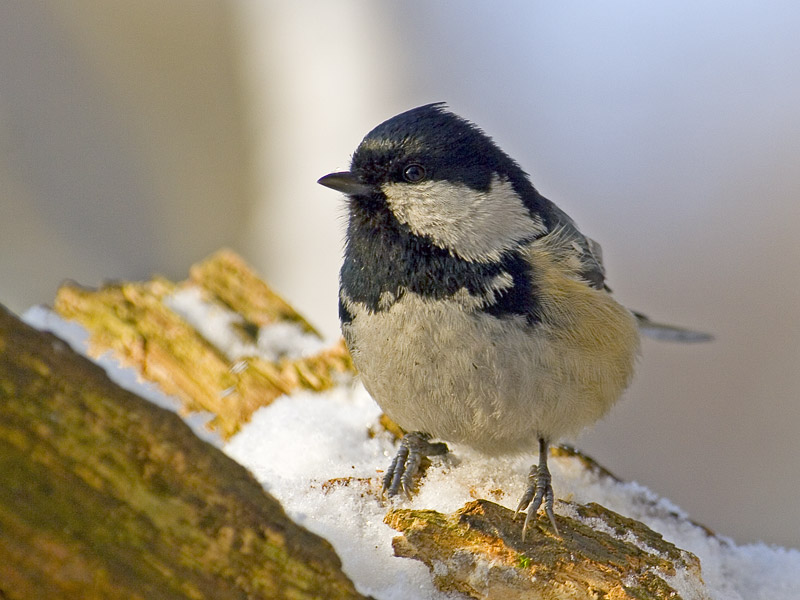
Meixengra (tit)

- meixengra sb.f 'tit' ('casali de meygengos', 1272), from Germanic *maisingaz 'titmouse'. Cognates: French mesange, Old Occitan mezanga, Old Nordic meisingr. Derivatives: meixengro (or meijengro) 'astute, smart'.
- mouta sb.f. 'bushes, haystack', maybe from PGmc *maþwō 'meadow'. Derivatives: mouteira idem.
- nafro sb.m., nafres sb.f.p. 'nose, mouth' (19th century), maybe from PGmc *nabjan 'beac, nose'. Cognates: ON nef, OE nebb idem, Occitan nefa 'beak', French nèfe. Derivatives: nafrado, nafrudo 'having large snout/muzzle', nafrán 'ugly', (es)nafrar vb. 'to hurt one's nose', nifrón 'whiner'.
- ornear vb. 'to bray, neigh' (18th century), from PGmc *hurnjanan 'to blow a horn'. Cognates: Gothic haurnjan idem. Derivatives: orneón 'drone of a bagpipe'.
- Old Galician osa sb.f. 'boot, legwear' ('osas factas de duos solidos', 860), from PGmc *husōn 'trousers'. Cognates: Italian hosa, Old French huese, Occitan oza, Old Spanish huesa, ON, OHG hosa 'hose, gaiter', OE hose id.
- ouva sb.f. 'elf, imp, spirit' (19th century), from PGmc *albaz 'elf'. Cognates: English elf, ON alfr, OHG alb.
- pino sb.m. 'pole; peak, slope', from PGmc *pennō 'pin, nail, tip'. Cognates: ON pinni 'pin', OE pinn id., OHG pfin 'nail'.

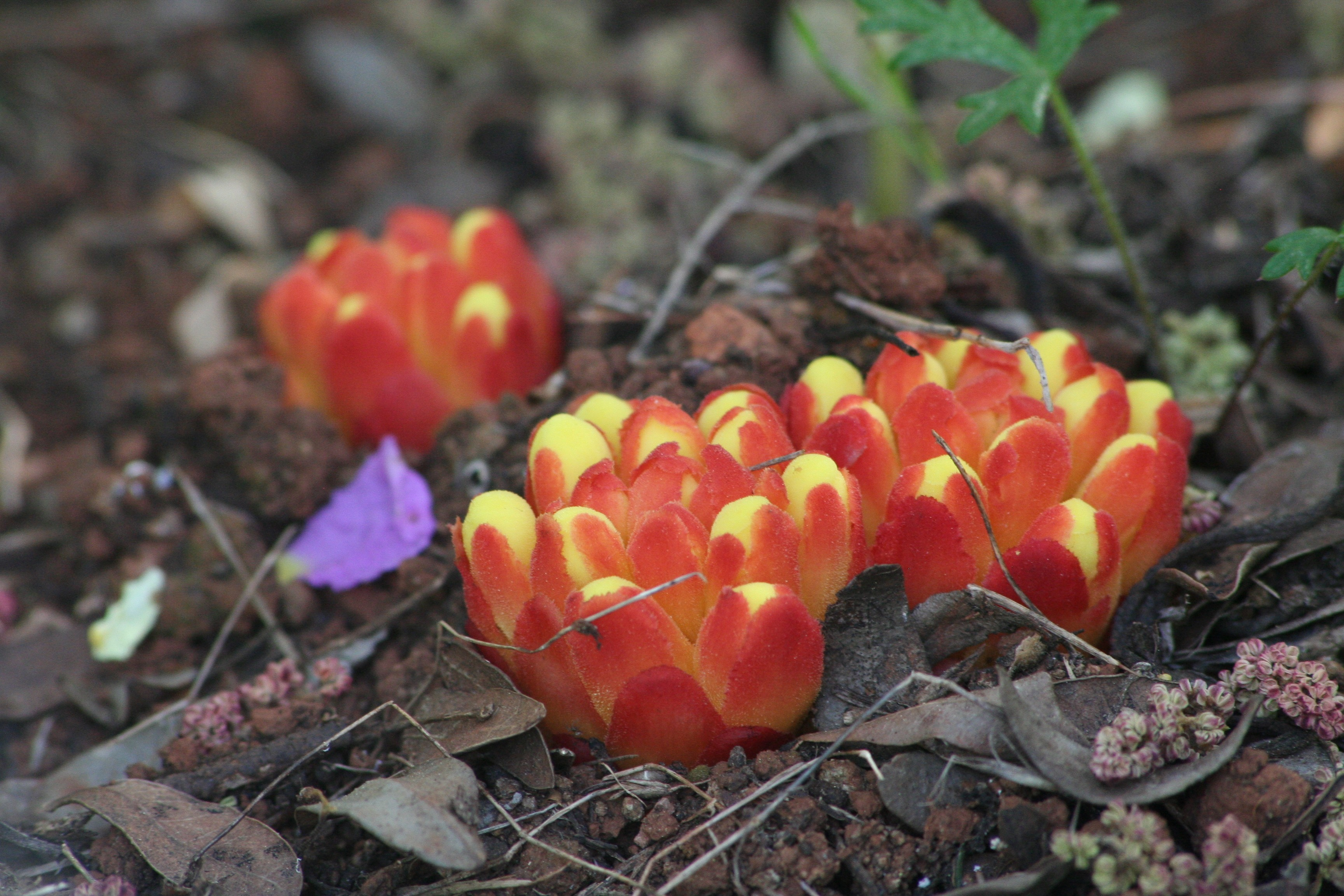
Poutegas (Cytinus hypocistis)

- pouta sb.f. 'paw' (18th century), from a possibly Germanic *pautō 'paw'. Cognates: Catalan pota, French poue, Occitan pauta, M.Dutch poot, German Pfote. Derivatives: poutega (Cytinus hypocistis), poutada, poutas de zorro, pouta loba, poutear
- rafar vb. 'to wear away, to rub', rafa sb.f. ranfón sb.m. 'scrape, crumb, fragment', from PGmc *hrappjanan 'to rip, snatch', maybe through Old French raffer. Cognates: Italian raffare 'to rob', OHG raffen 'to snatch'.
- rampelo/a adj 'thin, small, ugly', rampelada sb.f. 'handful of grass', from PGmc *hrampaz 'thin, contracted'. Cognates: Italian rampa 'claw', Occitan rampa 'cramp', French rampe 'ramp', Norwegian (dial.) ramp 'thin man', MLG ramp 'cramp'.
- rapar vb. 'to rasp, shave, crop' ('et medium de Pedro Rapado', 1144), from PGmc *hrappjanan 'to rip, snatch'. Cognates: Italian arrappare 'to tear', Occitan 'to tear, clamber', ON hreppa 'to catch, from obtain', OE hreppan 'to touch, from treat'. Derivatives: rapada 'handful of grain' ('rapada de trigo', c. 1261), rapa, rapón 'scraper', rapante 'fourspotted megrim', rapote 'cake made of scrapped dough' ('Gonçaluo Rapote', 1334).
- raspar vb. 'to scrape together' ('Pedro Raspallo', 14th century), from a Germanic *hresp- 'to plunder'. Cognates: Italian raspare, French râper, Occitan raspar, OE gehresp 'pillage', OHG giresp 'robbery'. Derivatives: raspa, raspón, raspeta, 'lime, scrapper', raspallo 'rest of something' ('Pedro Raspallo',1340), raspalleiro 'thieve, miserable person', raspiar 'to rub', raspizo 'European plaice'.
- rico adj 'rich, powerful' ('sicut ea ab antiquo percipere consueverunt de ricos et maiordomos', 1200), from PGmc *rīkjaz 'mighty, powerful'. Cognates: Italian ricco, French riche, Occitan ric, Goth reikeis 'noble', ON ríkr 'mighty, powerful'. Derivatives:riqueza 'wealth' ('pola gran requeza que eno logar avia', 13th century), enriquecer 'to enrich, prosper', ricome 'nobleman, count' ('ricus homo', 1192; 'ricome', 1214).
- rima, rimeiro sb.m. 'ordered pile of firewood', and (a)garimar 'to bring next to, lean, join; to caress' ('agarimou o moço a feixes que estavan feitos d'espigas', 13th century), from PGmc *rīman 'row, number, computation', Cognates: OHG rīm 'row, number', girīman 'count, add', OE gerīm id. Derivatives: agarimo 'shelter'.
- ripa sb.f. 'rafter, batten' ('de cabros t de ripa t de tella', 1317), from PGmc *rebjan 'rib': ON rif 'rib', OE ribb, OHG ribbi id. Derivatives: ripar 'to cover with batten a frame'.
- ripar vb. 'to rake, to scratch off, to scrape off, thresh' (19th century), from a Germanic *rippen 'to rub, scrape'. Cognates: French riper 'to scratch', OHG rippeln 'faire passer le lin dans un peigne de fer qui sépare la graine des tiges', Dutch ripf 'scraper'. Derivatives: arripar, arripazar, idem; ripo ripón ripanzo, ripadeira 'comb for scratching the seeds off the flax'; arripio bravo 'common madder'.
- rispar vb. 'to rub, to snatch; to sneak off', from PGmc *hrespan 'to pull, to plunder'. Cognates: OGH hrespan 'to tear, to pull', OE gehrespan 'to plunder, to tear'.
- roán adj. 'roan (horse)' ('raudane', 979), from PGmc *raudōn 'red'. Cognates: Spanish roano 'id', ON rauði 'red metal', OHG rōto 'red trout'.
- roca sb.f. 'distaff', from PGmc *rukkōn id. Cognates: Italian rocca, Spanish rueca, ON rokkr, OHG roc id.
- roubar vb. 'to steal, to rob' ('et raubaui uestras greges', 1133), from PGmc *raubōjanan 'to rob'. Cognates: Italian rubare, Occitan raubar, Spanish robar, Goth biraubon, ON raufa, OE réafian, OHG roubōn id. Derivatives: roubo 'robbery'.
- roupa sb.f. 'clothes' ('et de raupa Ia manto zingave et una pelle', 1074), from PGmc *raupjanan 'to pluck, from spoil'. Cognates: Spanish ropa 'clothes', Goth raupjan 'to pluck', OE rīpan 'to spoil, from plunder'. Derivatives: arroupar, enroupar 'to cover, to dress', desenroupar, desarroupar 'to undress, to uncover', roupeiro 'wardrobe', gardarroupa 'wardrobe' (guardaroupa, 1326), poucarroupa 'miserable man'.
- sa sb.f. 'common generation, common origin' ('aliam villam quam dicunt Sala', 916), maybe from PGmc *salaz 'hall, dwelling'. Cognates: French salle, ON salr, OE sele, OHG sal 'house, hall'.
- Old Galician sayon sb.m. 'official' ('Vicentius, sagio regis, ts.', 844), from Gothic sagio 'official'. Cognates: Spanish sayon.
- sopa sb.f. 'soup, sop, bread soaked in broth, milk or wine; wedge' ('soparia exaurata; copas exauratas cum copertoriis II', 942), from PGmc *suppōn, or *sūpō 'soup'. Cognates: Italian zuppa, Old French soupe, Occitan, Spanish sopa, ON soppa 'sop', supa 'soup', OE 'soppe'. Derivatives: sopeira 'pot', ensopar 'to soak'.
- souria sb.f. 'dry wind', resouro sb.m. 'sun-burnt', chourizo sb.m. 'chorizo, cured sausage' ('faz bon souriç'e lava ben transsido', 13th century), from PGmc *sauzjanan 'to make dry'. Cognates: French harenc saur 'dry herring', Occitan saur 'light brown', OE seár 'dry, barren', Norwegian søyra 'to make dry'.
- tapa, tampa sb.f. 'lid, cap, cover' (c. 1240), from PGmc *tappōn 'tap'. Cognates: Spanish tapa 'lid', tapón 'plug', Italian tappo, French tapon, ON tappi 'tap', OE tæppa, OHG zapfo id. Derivatives: tapón tapo tampo tapullo 'plug, lid' ('Vaamos catar a Cuba e tiremo-ll'o tapon', 1264); tapar atapanar tamponar 'to cover, close, put the lid on; to weave' ('ca che tapo eu d'aquesta minha boca a ta boca, Marinha', c.1240); destapar 'to uncover, open, uncork'; tapada 'fenced property' ('a mina cortina conmo esta chousa et tapada', 1333); tapaxe 'fence'; tapadeira 'cover'; tapume 'warp'.
- targa sb.f. 'wooden ring used as fastener, buckle', from PGmc *targōn 'rim, edge, shield'. Cognates: French targe ( > Galician tarxeta), Occitan targa, ON targa 'target, a small round shield', OE targe 'small shield', OHG zarga 'framing'.
- tasca sb.f. 'hand net', from PGmc *taskōn 'bag'. Cognates: Italian tasca, Old Frech tasche, Occitan tasca, ON taska 'trunk, chest, pouch, pocket', MLG tasche 'bag'.
- tascar vb. 'to beat flax, crack, shatter, rub', from PGmc *taskōn 'to snatch'. Cognates: Spanish tascar idem, OHG zascōn 'to tear'.

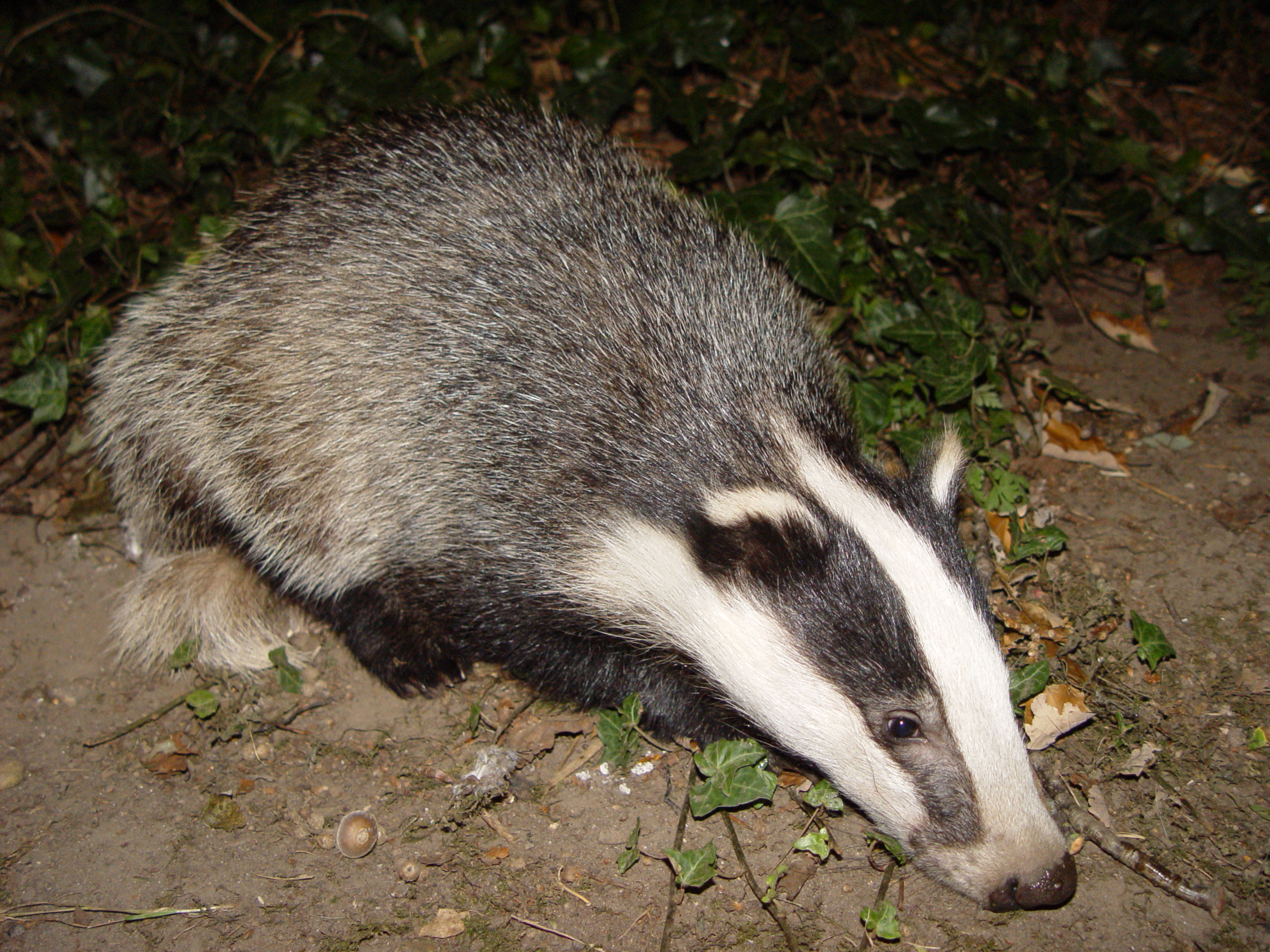
Teixugo (badger)

- teixo, teixón, teixugo, porco-teixo sb.m. 'badger' ('per medium valle de Linare Monte, et inde a Texunarias, et inde ad Alvarina', 1104), to PGmc *þaxsuz 'badger'. Cognates: Italian tasso, Old French taisson, Spanish tejon, tasugo, Norwegian svin-toks 'badger', OHG dahs id. Derivatives: teixugueira 'badger's sett'.
- teta sb.f. 'tit ('e as tetas pendoradas e mui grandes', c. 1240), either an expressive word, or from Germanic *tittō(n) idem. Cognates: Italian tetta, French tette, Spanish, Occitan teta, Norwegian dial. titta, OE titt, MHG zitze. Derivatives: tetelo 'beak'.
- toldo sb.m. 'awning, cloth', from PGmc *teldan, maybe through French taud. Cognates: ON tjald 'tent, hangings', OE teld, OHG zelt id. Derivatives: atoldar 'to shade'.
- tormelo sb.m. 'sty, swelling, lump, heap', either from PGmc *þrumilaz, *þrumōn 'piece', or to another, pre-Latin, IE language. Cognates: French trumeau 'leg, trousers, window pillar', Spanish tormo 'rock', ON þrymill 'hard knot in the flesh', OHG drum 'end-piece, remnant, splinter'.
- tosquiar vb. 'to shave, to shear' ('Vi coteifes orpelados estar mui mal espantados, e genetes trosquiados corrian-nos arredor', 13th century), from a composite of Latin TONDERE and PGmc *skeranan 'to cut, to shear', Cognates: Spanish esquilar, trasquilar, Aragonese esquirar, ON skera 'to cut', OE sceran 'to cut, to shear', OHG skeran.
- trapa, trampa sb.f. 'trap, snare, trapdoor' ('in loco qui dicitur Trapela', 1246), to PGmc *trapp- 'to stomp, tread'. Cognates: French trappe, Occitan trapa, Spanish trampa, Norw dial. trappa 'to stomp', MLG trappen id, OE treppan 'to tread'. Derivatives: trapela, trapicela 'trap, snare, trapdoor, little door'; trapexar, trapiñar 'to stamp, to kick out'; atrapar 'to trap'; trapallada 'trick, fraud, nonsense'; atrapallar trapazar 'to embroil, confuse'; trampulleiro, trapalleiro, trapaceiro, trapazas, trampón 'liar, crook'.
- tregua sb.f. 'truce' ('in presencia episcopi uel uillici et clericorum treugas petierit', 1161; 'cum eis treguas vel pacem habuerit et eis guerram non fecerit', 1183), from PGmc *trewwō 'agreement'. Cognates: Italian, Spanish, Occitan tregua, French trève, Gothic triggwa 'covenant, testament', OE tréow 'truth, faith', OHG triuwa.
- Old Galician trigar vb. 'to hurry, rush, hasten' ('come moller non faças maa que se triga a ffazer mal ssa fazenda', 13th century) to PGmc *þrenxwanan 'to press, to throng'. Cognates: Gothic þreihan 'to press, to throng', OHG dringan 'to press, to drive'. Derivatives trigança 'promptness', trigoso 'swift'.
- tripar, trepar, trepexar vb. 'to tread, stomp; climb', from PGmc *trappjanan idem. Cognates: French treper, Occitan, Spanish trepar, OE treppan 'to tread'. Derivatives: tripadela, tripadura 'step, stamp on the foot'; trepexo 'restless'.
- triscar vb. 'to thresh, thrash, tread, bite' ('ou se me fano, ou se m'en trescar', c. 1240), to PGmc *þreskanan idem. Cognates: Italian trescare, Old French treschier, Occitan trescar 'to dance', Spanish triscar 'trample', Gothic þriskan 'to thresh', OE ðerscan 'to strike', OHG dreskan id. Derivatives: trisca/o 'splinter'.
- Old Galician trocir vb. 'to swallow; to cross' ('ja non podía nen sól trocir tres bocados', c. 1270), from PGmc *þrukkjanan 'to press'. Cognates: OHG drucken 'to press, push'.
- trofa sb.f. 'lintel; raincoat', from a Germanic *traufa 'eaves, gutter', to PGmc *draupjanan 'to drop, dip'. Cognates: German traufe 'eaves'.
- trouso sb.m. 'snowdrift', trousar vb. 'to vomit', from PGmc *drausjanan 'to throw down' and *drauzaz 'gore, blood'. Cognates: Gothic gadrausjan 'to overthrow', OHG trōren 'to rain'.
- varón sb.m. 'man' (filios barones, 870), from PGmc *baraz 'man'. Cognates: OHG bar 'son, man'; Pt. varão, Sp. varón 'man'; Fr. baron, Ital. barone, Occ. Cat. baró 'nobleman'. Derivatives: varudo 'manly, robust',
- xab(r)ón sb.m. 'soap' ('et despois hu[n]tar aquel paao con sabon mourisco, et metello lleuemente dentro', c. 1420), from PGmc *saip(j)ō(n) 'resin, soap'. Cognates: Rumanian sâpun, Italian sapone, French savon, Occitan sabó, Spanish jabon, Portuguese sabão, OE sápe 'soap', sáp 'amber, resin', OHG seifa id. Derivatives: herba xaboeira 'Saponaria officinalis L.', enxaboar 'to soap'.

== Other Germanic words incorporated during the Middle Ages ==
Many other words of Germanic origin were incorporated into the Galician language, most notably from during the 12th and 13th centuries, from French and Occitan, as French and Occitan culture (through the Cluniac reform and Cistercian monks; French noblemen, migrants, pilgrims and stonemasons; and Provençal lyrics) had a massive cultural impact in Galicia during the Middle Ages.

Another large number of words, related to seafaring and navigation, were incorporated also through French, English, Dutch, or Frisian navigators.

- Old Galician abete sb.m. 'cheat' ('Aquel Soldan, sen mentir, cuidou que per abete o querian envayr os seus', 13th century), from French abet 'bait', from PGmc *bītanan 'to bite'.
- adubar vb. 'to dispose, to prepare' ('por quê vus deterrei u ren non adubades?', c. 1240), from Old French adober, aduber 'to equip, to prepare', from an Old Frankish dubban 'to prepare'. Derivatives: adubo, adubeiro, adubío 'garnish, seasoning, dressing', adubiar 'to garnish'.

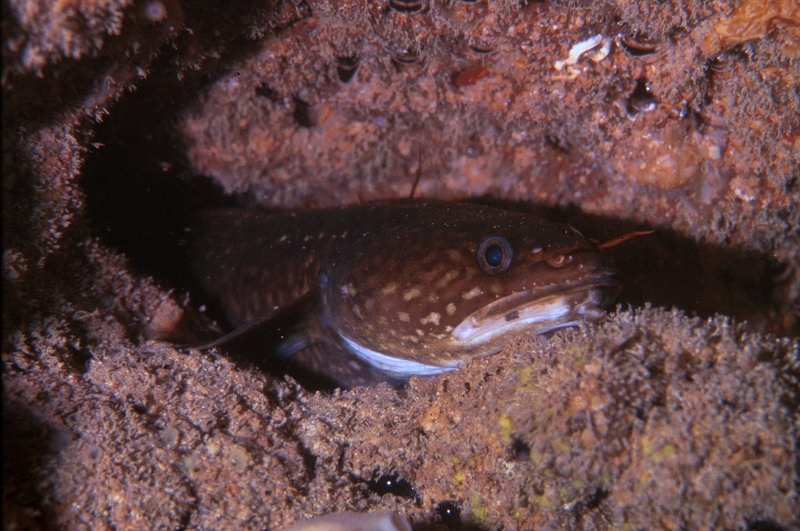
guaita (shore rockling)

- agaitar, agoitar vb. 'to watch, spy', guaita 'Shore rockling', guitón 'curious', from Occitan aguaitar 'to ambush', French guet 'guardian', from PGmc *wahtwō 'watch, guard'.
- ana sb.f. 'unit of length', from Occitan alna, from PGmc *alinō 'cubit'.
- anca sb.f. 'haunch, hip' ('quando o Cauallo naçe con hũa anca mais dereita que a outra', 15th century), from French hanche, from Old Frankish *hanka 'hip'.
- ardido adj. 'bold' ('empero foi ela i tan ardida, que ouve depois a vencer', 13th century), from Occitan ardit, from PGmc *hardjanan 'toughen'.
- arnés sb.m. 'military armour' ('Desque me vi garnesçido de arnes de tal valia', 1355), from Old French herneis, from Old Norse *herrnest. or rather from another Germanic root.
- arranxar vb. 'to arrange', from French arranger, from PGmc *hrengaz 'circle'. Derivatives: arranxo 'order'.
- bigode sb.m. 'moustache' ('María Bigode', 1346), from French bigot.
- bofardo sb.m. 'reed' from Old Galician bafordo 'lance', bafordar 'to duel' ('podedes en bafordar o tavlado britar', 13th century), from Old French behourt, from Old Frankish *bihurdan 'enclose'.

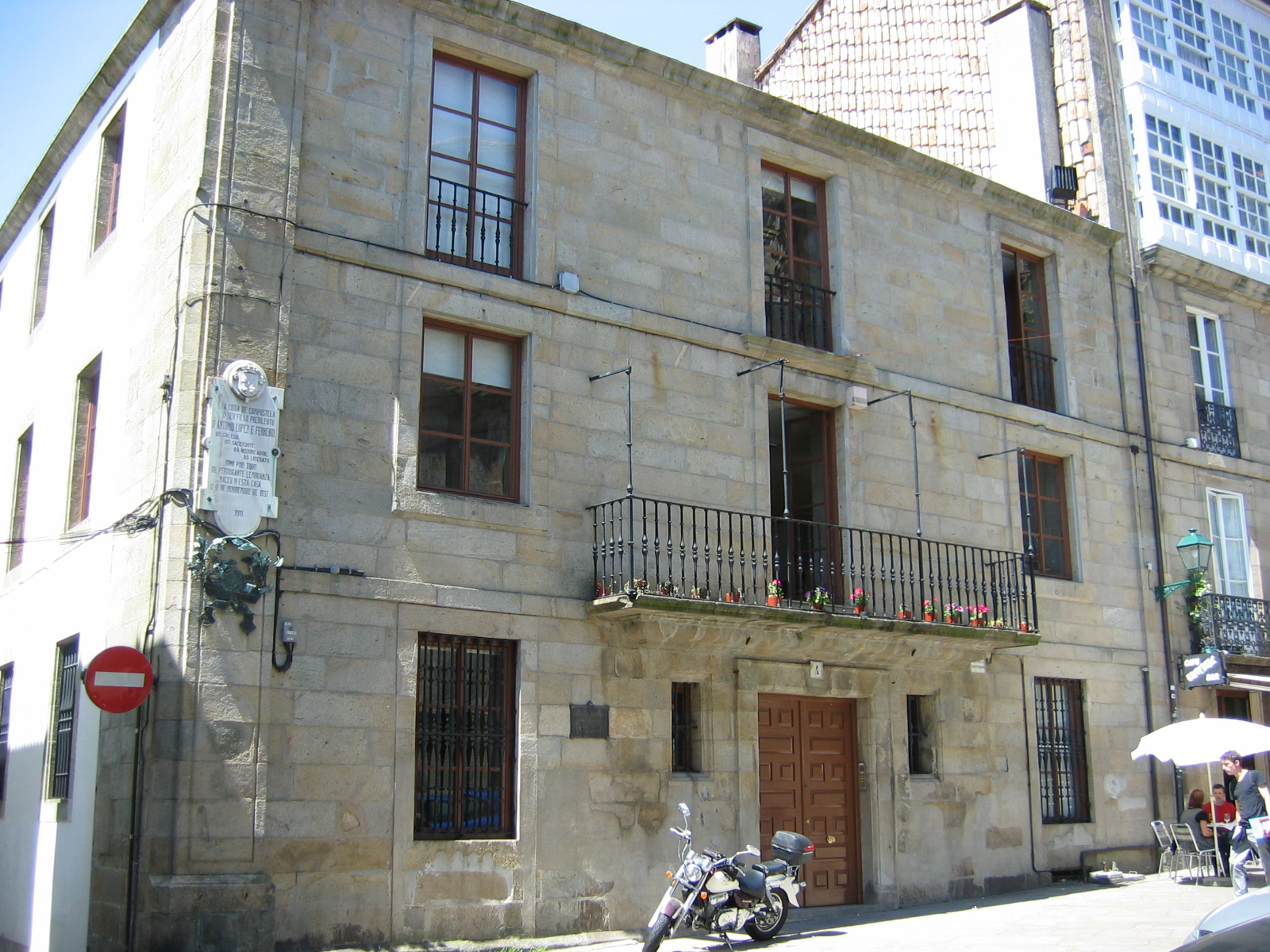
Balcón (balcony)

- balcón sb.m. 'balcony' (que non entargem o viso das feestras do balcon, 1347), from PGmc *balkōn 'beam', probably through Occitan balcon 'balcony'. or Italian balcone Cognates: It. balco 'hayloft', OHG balco 'beam', OE balca 'beam, bank, ridge'.
- baldón sb.m. 'abuse, poke', abaldoar vb. 'to injury', a baldon 'freely; at will' ('que aos que ela ama por ll'errar non abaldõa', 13th century), from Occitan a bandon 'at will'.
- branco adj. 'white' ('et sub illa Nicolas Martinis et Wilelmus Branco', 1177), from Occitan blanc, from PGmc *blankaz 'white, bright'.
- abandonar vb. 'to abandon' (18th century), from Old French abandonner.

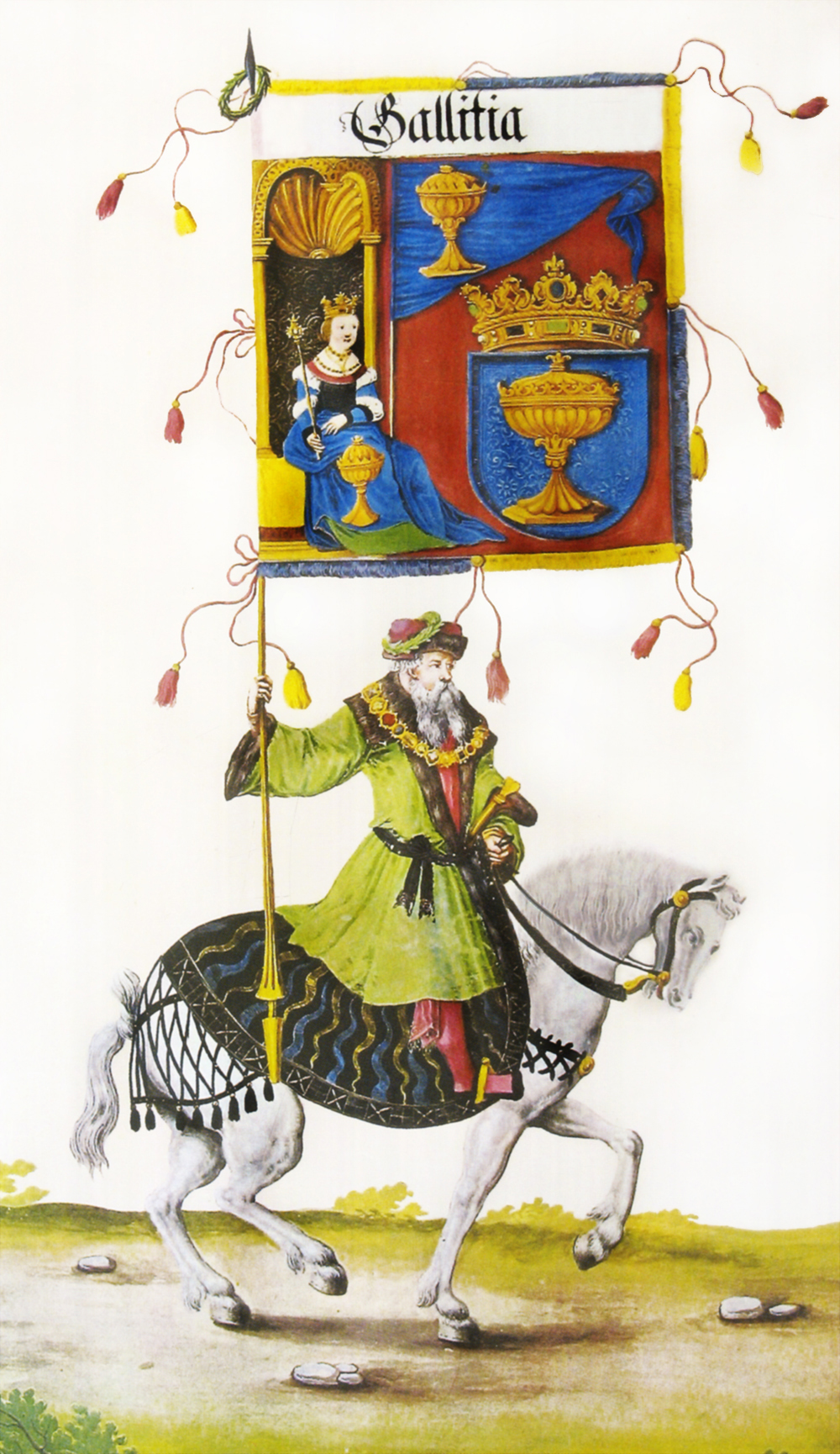
Bandeira (flag)

- bandeira sb.f. 'flag', from Old French bannière, from PGmc *bandwō 'sign'.
- banir vb. 'to banish' ('et banyron dende ao arcibispo', 1371), from PGmc *bannōjanan 'to speak aloud, to announce', through French bannir 'to banish'.
- bastir vb. 'to build; to supply' ('dizendo que esta vila non sse podia bastir d'omes d'armas', 13th century), from Occitan bastir, from PGmc *bastjan 'to build, from sew'. Derivatives: abastar, abastecer 'to provide', abasto 'supply'
- bordel sb.m. 'brothel', from Occitan or Old French bordel, from PGmc *burdan 'board, plank'. Derivatives: bordeleiro 'cabin'.
- bosque, brosque sb.m. 'forest, wood' ('Et diz Dayres que estes dous cõdes eram moy nomeados et moy preçados ẽno bosco de Mõtes Claros.', 14th century), maybe from a Germanic *buskaz, through a Gallo-Romance *boscu, *bosci., Old French bosc, Occitan bosc, Italian bosco
- botar vb. 'to throw' ('atal era outr' amor de meu tio, que se botou á pouca de sazone ', 13th century), from PGmc *bautanan 'to beat', through Occitan botar.
- botón sb.m. 'button' ('Iten xvi botoes que ten Fernan Peres de Meyra por v mor.', 1321), from French bouton, from PGmc *bautanan. Derivatives: abotoar 'to botton up'.
- brida sb.f. 'bridle' ('preçaron hua brida e a metade de huas cardas en satenta maravedis', 1474), from French bride, from a Germanic form *brittil 'to weave'.
- brotar vb.'to sprout' (18th century), from Occitan brot, from a Gothic form *brut- related to PGmc *spreutanan 'to sprout'. Derivatives: brotón, bretón 'bud'.
- brun adj.m bruna adj.f. 'dark' (12th century), from French brun 'brown', from PGmc *brūnaz 'brown'.
- buril sb.m. 'burin' (19th century), from French burin, maybe from PGmc *burōjanan 'to bore'.
- buxeo sb.m. 'butcher', from French boucher idem, from PGmc *bukkaz 'goat, ram'.
- cambás sb.m 'jerkin' ('et vestironllj a carõ hũu cambays de çendal delgado', c. 1295), from Old French gambais, from PGmc *wambō 'belly'.
- cota sb.f. 'coat; hilt' ('et in alia vice vna cota vnum equm et duas marcas', 1198), from Old French cote, from a Germanic *kotta 'coat'.
- Old Galician cousir vb. 'to advise, discern, sample' ('anbas eran-nas melhores que omem pode cousir', 1220), from Occitan causir, from PGmc *kausjanan 'to sample, to choose'.
- dardo m. 'dart, lance, from French dard ('dando et rreçebendo grãdes golpes d'azcuas et de dardos et de seetas', 1295), from PGmc *darraþaz 'dart, spear'.
- Old Galician drudo sb.m. druda sb.f. 'lover' ('vossa molher á bon drudo, baroncinho mui velido', 13th century), from Occitan druda, from PGmc *drūþaz 'friend, beloved'. Derivatives: drudaria 'gallantry'.
- embaixada 'embassy', from Occitan ambaissada, from PGmc *andbahtjan 'service'.
- Old Galician esbaldir vb. 'to be bold or wanton' ("e, pois que s'esbaldir, se [alguen] s'en queixar, busque-me liça", 13th century), from Occitan esbaudir, from PGmc *balþaz 'bold'.
- a escote adv. 'at (shared) expenses' (18th century), from Old French escot 'bill, tax', from a Germanic verb meaning 'tax, payment' (English scot-free, German Schoß).
- esgrima sb.f. 'fight, debate, fencing' ('aqueles que sabíã de esgrima et que erã moy bõos caualeyros', 1370), esgrimir 'to wield' ('em aquel lugar vio Dauid hu angeo esgrimyr hua espada', 14th century), from Occitan esgremir, from a Germanic *skirmjan 'to protect'.

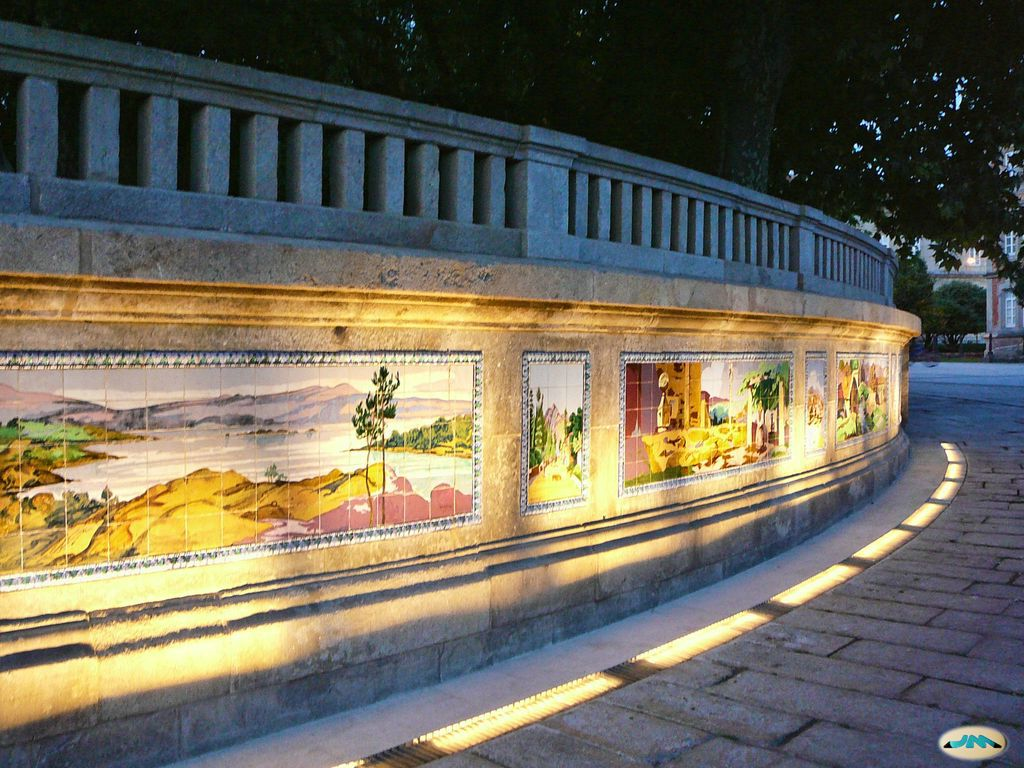
Esmaltes (glazed tiles) in Pontevedra

- esmalte sb.m. 'enamel, enamel-work' ('todo cheo de esmaltes et de pedras preçiosas', c. 1350), from Olf French smalt, from PGmc *smaltan 'melted fat, lard'. Derivatives: esmaltar 'to enamel > to carve' ('et os esmaltes et o meu Reliquario esmaltado', 1395).
- Old Galician esmarrido adj. 'sad, unhappy, astray' ('se viu pobre, foi end'esmarrido', 13th century), from French esmarrit id, from PGmc *marzjanan 'to hinder'.
- espingarda sb.m. 'gun' (1481), from Old French espingarde, from PGmc *sprenganan 'to burst, spring, jump'.
- esquila sb.m. 'bell' ('et ajuntarõ outras esquilas que sonauã muy bẽ', 1295), probably from Old Occitan esquila, from PGmc *skellaz 'loud, sonorous'. Derivative: esquilón ('esquilós', 1862) 'cowbell'.
- Old Galician estanforte sb.m. 'kind of cloth' ('meum pallium de estanfort', 1208), to French stanfort, from Stanford, England.
- faraute sb.m. 'herald', from French héraut, form PGmc *hariwaldaz, Cognates: Spanish heraldo, Italian araldo, English herald. Derivatives: farauteiro 'scandalmonger'.
- felón adj. 'evil, traitor' ('Assi que do demo felon non entremos en sa prijon', 13th century), from Occitan felon, from a Germanic *fillons 'butcher, executioner', from PGmc *fellan 'skin'. Derivatives: felonía 'evil deed'.
- fornecer vb. 'to provide, make strong', derived from Old Galician fornir id. ('et [cresçeo] logo et fezose fornydo', 14th century), from French fournir, 'to deliver'. Derivatives: fornido 'strong, big'.
- forrar 'to line, pad' ('com manto forrado com hũa solja cardea e fforrado de çendal', 14th century), from Old French forrer, from PGmc *fōdran 'lining'.
- frecha sb.f.'arrow' ('mays tragiã todos frechas et seetas de moytas maneyras', 14th century), from French flèche, maybe from a Germanic *fleuk-.

Galopando (galloping)

- galopar vb. 'to gallop' ('Et fazíao yr ao galope cõtra troyãos', 1370), from French galoper, from PGmc *wela-hlaupanan 'to run well'. Derivatives: galope 'gallop'.
- guarantee vb. 'guarantor, surety' ('Pedro Perez Guarante', 1289), to French garant. Derivatives: garantía 'guarantee', garantizar 'to warrant'.
- garañón sb.m. 'stallion', from French garagnon, from PGmc *wrain(j)ōn 'stallion'.
- Old Galician garçon sb.m. 'young man' ('Teu fillo, mui mal garçon', 13th century), from French garçon, from PGmc *warzaz 'wart'. or rather from *wrakjo-
- garupa sb.f. 'crupper' ('gurupeiras', 16th century), from French croupe, from PGmc *kruppaz 'bunch'. Derivatives: gurupeira 'pillion', gurupela 'hillock'.
- gastón sb.m. 'hilt, grip', engastoar vb. 'to inlay, to insert' ('a sortella, en ouro engastõada', 1264), from Old French caston, from a Germanic *kasto 'box'. Derivatives: gastallo 'carving, notch', engastallar 'to carve; to immobilize something'.
- gaxe sb.m. 'emolument, pledge, hostage' ('meu senhor, seede sage que prendades dele gage', c. 1240), to Occitan gatge, to PGmc *wadjan 'pledge, guarantee. Derivatives: andar de gaxe ' to carouse'.
- Old Galician giga sb.f. 'fiddle' ('Et este donzel tyña toda las maneyras de estormētos: giga et arpa et çimfonya', 14th century), from Occitan giga, from a Germanic *gīga, id.
- grator sb.m. 'scraper, for tin' (16th century), from Occitan gratar, from a Germanic *kratten 'to scratch'.
- grinalda sb.f. 'wreath, garland' ('un cavaleiro fazia a guirlanda das rosas a Santa Maria', c. 1264), to Old French garlande, from PGmc *warnōjanan 'to equip'.
- gris adj. 'grey', from Occitan gris 'grey; squirrel' ('quarteiros II de pane et saiam vel ceramem de griseni', 1154), from PGmc *grīsaz 'grey'. Derivatives: grisallo griseu 'greyish'
- guante sb.f. 'glove' (18th century), from Old French guant, from PGmc *wantuz. Derivatives: aguantar 'to hold up, to endure'.
- hucha sb.f. 'bin, chest' ('logo da ucha tirou o sartal e en sa mão', 1264), from French huche, of probable Germanic origin.
- laido adj. 'ugly' ('que seu açor lle daria viv'e são sen laidura', 1264), from Occitan lait, from PGmc *laiþaz 'loathed, disliked'.
- liza sb.f. 'fight, arena' ('se alguen s'en queixar, busque-me liça', 13th century), from French lice id, from PGmc *līstōn 'ledge'.
- lote sb.m. 'lot, share' ('vendo lotum quinionem meum de hereditate', 1257), from French lot, from PGmc *hlautaz 'lot'.
- mala sb.f. 'suitcase', from French malle, from PGmc *malhaz 'knapsack'.
- mariscal sb.m. 'Marshall' ('leyra de vina mandou Gonçalvo Mariscal', 1423), from Old French mareschal, marescal (> French maréchal), from PGmc *marha-skalkaz 'horse-groom'.
- marqués sb.m marquesa sb.f. 'marquis, marchioness' ('non avia no reino duc nen conde nen marques que fosse de mayor guisa', 13th century), from Occitan marques id, from PGmc *markō 'region, boundary'.
- Old Galician onta sb.f. 'humiliation' ('ante que sofrer tal torto et tal onta', 1370), from Old French honte, from PGmc *hauniþō 'shame, humiliation'.
- orgullo sb.m. 'pride' ('mellor pobreza con omildade ca requeza mal gãada con orgullo', c. 1264), from Catalan orgull, from a Germanic form *urgōli 'proud'. Derivatives: orgulloso (c. 1264) 'proud, arrogant'.
- randa sb.f. 'lace ending (dress)', from Occitan randa 'end'; de randon adv. 'violently', from Occitan de randon id., from PGmc *randiz 'rim, edge'.

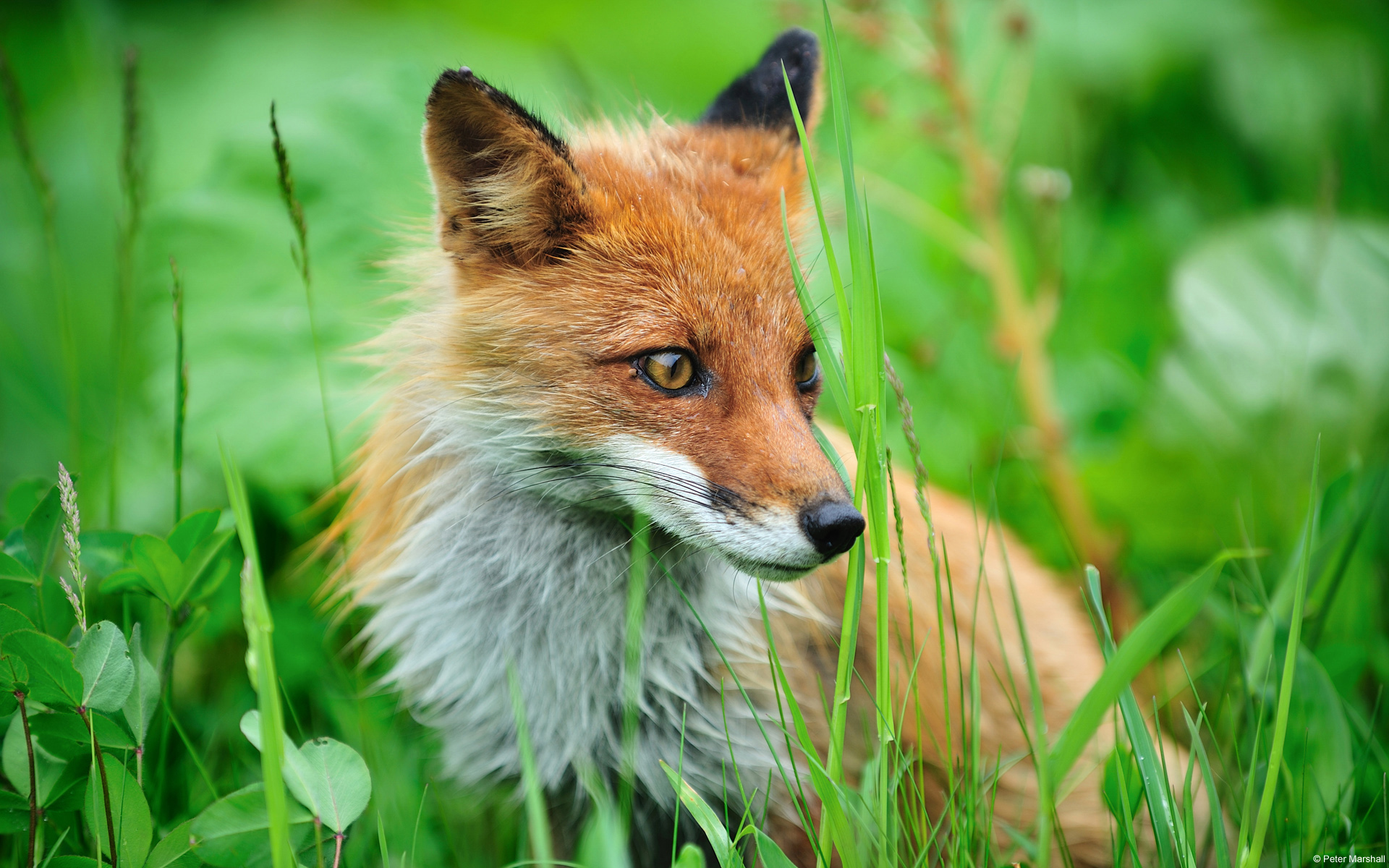
renarte (fox), also known as raposo or golpe

- renarte adj. 'astute', sb.m. 'fox', from Occitan renart, itself from Old French Renart, from the Germanic personal name Reginhart.
- renco sb.m. 'lame (due from paralysis)', from Catalan (?) ranc, from PGmc *rankaz 'straight'. or *wrankjan 'twisted'. Cognates: Spanish renquear 'to drag one's leg, to limp', Italian rancare 'to limp'.
- renque, rengue sb.m. 'row, series', from Occitan renc, from PGmc *hrengaz 'circle'. Derivatives: ringleira id.
- Old Galician ribaldo sb.m. 'libertine man' ('mui maas conpannas se foron tan tost' y meter, ribaldos e jogadores de dados', 13th century), from Old French ribaud, from a Germanic *hrīban 'whore'.
- Old Galician rota sb.f. 'string instrument' ('tódaslas maneyras de estormētos: giga, arpa, cinfonja, rrota', 1370), from Occitan rota, from a Germanic *hrotta.
- rustrir vb. 'to roast, fry' (18th century), from Old French rostir, from PGmc *raustjan 'to roast'. Derivatives: rustrido 'stir-fry'.
- sala sb.f. 'room, hall' ('en a sala dos paaços nouos do dito sennor arçobispo', 1446), from French salle, from PGmc *salaz 'hall, dwelling'. Derivatives: salón 'hall'.
- Old Galician sen sb.m. 'mind, judgement, reason' ('Cuidand'en ela ja ei perdudo o sen, amigo', 13th century), from Occitan sen, from a Germanic sin idem.
- senescal 'steward', from Occitan senescal, from PGmc *siniscalkaz 'Old-Servant'.
- tarxa sb.f. 'fee; coin; an oyster (Anomia ephippium)' (16th century), from French targe 'shield', from PGmc *targōn 'rim'.
- toalla sb.m. 'towel; tablecloth (old)' ('et sauana. et coopertorio. et unas toalias ad refectorium', 1204), to Occitan toalha, to PGmc *þwahlan 'washing, bath'.
- tope, topo sb.m. 'summit, top' ('topou comigu'e sobraçou o manto e quis en mi achantar o caralho', 13th century), from PGmc *tuppaz 'crest, top'. Derivatives: atopar 'to find', topar 'to limit, bump' ('por los marcos asi como topa no regueiro', 1274); topete 'crest, pinnacle' ('cinta ancha e mui gran topete', c. 1240); topetar 'to bump'.
- tropel sb.m. 'troop, group, flock' ('Sobr'aquest'hua vegada chegou y un gran tropel de mancebos por jogaren à pelota', 1264), from Occitan tropel, from a Germanic form *tropp- 'herd'. Derivatives: atropelar ('grande era alí o puxar et o atropellar et o ferir', 1370) 'to knock down, trample'.
- trotar vb. 'to trot' ('deuenno cauallgar et fazerlle trotar porllas margẽs', 1409), from Occitan trotar, from OHG trottōn idem, from PGmc *tredanan 'to tread'. Derivatives: trote 'trot'.
- xolda, xoldra sb.f. 'crowd, spree' (19th century), from Old French jaude, from PGmc *geldōn 'guild member'.

=== Seafaring ===
- abita sb.f. 'bar (for the anchor)' (19th century), from French bitte, itself from Old Norse biti 'girder, cross-beam in a house or a boat', from PGmc *bitōn 'bar'.
- afalar 'to lead the cattle' (19th century), from French affaler, itself from Dutch afhalen 'to haul down'.
- agarrafín sb.m. 'Haddock (Gadus aeglefinus)', from French églefin, itself from Dutch schelvish.
- alar vb. 'to pull, tighten a rope' (19th century), from French haler, itself from an Old Norse hala idem or rather from Old Low Franconian / Old Saxon *halôn
- amarrar vb. 'to tie' ('e o que lavrar con huun boy nove medidas et o que lavrar con amarra tres medidas', 1412), from French amarrer, from Dutch anmarren. Derivatives: amarra 'rope', amarradeiro 'bollard'.
- arenque 'herring' sb.m. arenga sb.f. 'dried sardine' ('viinte et huu millares de sardiña arenquada', 1433), from Occitan arenc, itself from French hareng 'herring', from a Germanic *haring- 'herring'. Derivatives: arencar 'to dry fish'.
- arrumar vb. 'ordering, organizing a room', from Old French arruner / *arrumer idem (derived of dial. Old French rum, reum, run, rem 'room in a boat'), itself from Old Norse rúm 'space in a boat', from PGmc *rūman 'room'.
- batel sb.m. 'boat' ('Os do batel a remar se fillaron sen tardar por sse da nav'alongar', 13th century), from Old French batel (bateau), from Old English bāt.
- boia sb.f. ' buoy' ('er dizede que sabedes boiar, ca beno podedes dizer assi', 13th century), from French bouée, from PGmc *bauknan 'beacon'. Derivatives: aboiar 'to float'.
- bordo sb.m. 'board, side, rim' borde sb.m. 'plank' borda sb.f. 'rim' ('E o mercader eno bordo da nave estava enton encima dũa trave', 13th century), from PGmc *burdan 'board, plank' / *burdōn 'border'. Derivatives: abordar 'to board', abordaxe 'boarding', bordar 'to overflow', bordear 'to skirt'.
- canivete sb.m. 'penknife' (19th century), from Old French canivet (cf. French canif) 'knife', from PGmc *knībaz 'knife'.
- dala sb.f. 'drain', from French dalle, itself from Dutch daal or rather from Old Norse dæla.
- escora sb.f. 'prop' (18th century), from Old French escore, from PGmc *skeranan 'to cut'. Derivatives: escorar 'to prop, shore'.
- escota sb.f. 'sheet (naut.)', from Old French escote (Modern French écoute), itself from Old Norse skaut (cf. Icelandic skaut, Danish skøde), PGmc *skautan 'sheet, edge'.
- Old Galician esquipar vb. 'to fit out a ship' ('Este RRey Nastor tragia oytẽta naues bẽ esquipadas.', 1370), from Old French esquiper (related to Old French eschipre 'sailor', French équipe 'team'), itself from Old Norse skipa 'arrange, organize (on board)', from PGmc *skipan 'ship'.
- estrinque sb.m. 'hawser, string, chain' ('huu estrenque d'esparto novo et huu estrenque vello d'esparto', 1433), from Old French estren[c] 'moor', itself from Old Norse strengr 'moor, anchor rope', from PGmc *strangiz 'string'. Derivatives: estrincar', trincar 'to fasten, to tie' ('et os denunçien et manden denunçiar por malditos et publicos escomulgados en suas iglesias et moesteiros et capelas et manden denunçiar et estrincar a seus subditos', 1426), ballestrinque 'nautical knot'.
- frete sb.m. 'freight' ('assi foi que el ssa nav'ouve fretada pera yr a Frandes', 1264), from French fret, itself from Dutch vrecht, vracht, from PGmc *fra-aihtiz. Derivatives: fretar.

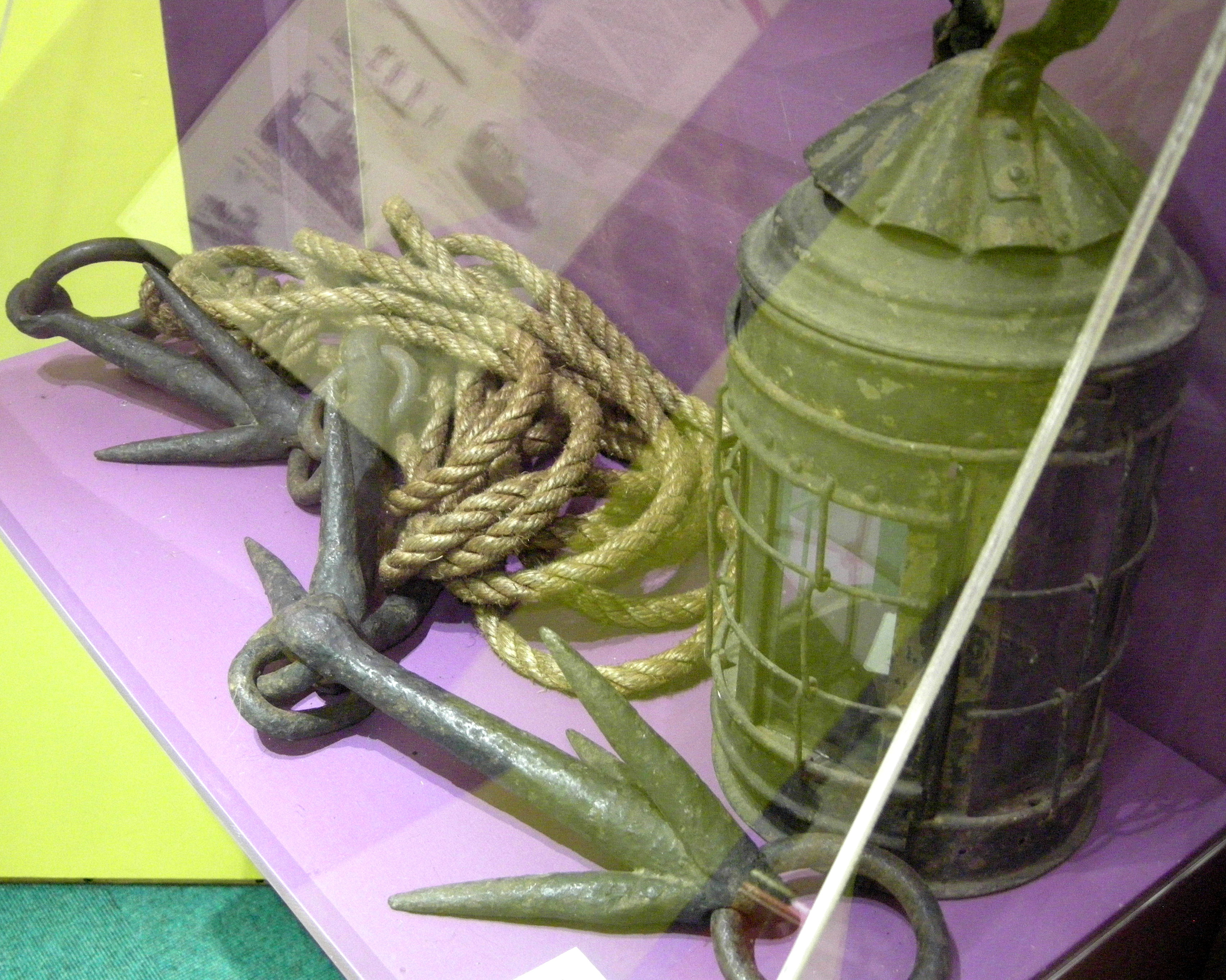
Grampín (grapnel)

- grampín sb.m. 'grapnel', from French grapin, influenced by Galician grampa 'cramp', from a Gothic *krampa 'iron hook'.
- guindaresa sb.f. 'string' ('hua gindaresa de fio de canavo', 1433), from French guinderesse, from Dutch windreep.
- guindastre sb.m. 'crane, windlass' ('duas palmelas et dous golfoos et cravos para o gindastes', 1418), from Old French guindas (NF guindeau), itself from Old Norse vindáss, from PGmc *wend-ansaz 'wind-pole'. Derivatives: guindaxe ('por todas avarias salvo gindajen', 1433), guindau, guindal, idem; guindar 'to throw, take down'.
- lastro sb.m. 'ballast', from French last, from Dutch last 'burden'.
- leste sb.m. 'East', from English East (maybe through French l'est) from PGmc *austaz
- macareu sb.m. 'Atlantic bonito', from French maquereau, maybe from Dutch makelaar 'negotiator'.
- mast(r)o sb.m. 'mast' ('Esta é como Santa Maria pareceu no maste da nave', 1264), from French mast, from PGmc *mastaz 'mast'.
- norte sb.m. 'North', from Old English North 'northwards', from PGmc *nurþaz 'North'.
- oeste sb.m. 'west', from OE west through French ouest, from PGmc *westan.
- quilla sb.f. 'keel', from French quille, from a Germanic *kiel 'keel'. or rather from Old Norse kilir, plural of kjölr 'keel' cf. Icelandic kjölur, Danish køl, Swedish köl 'keel'.
- rum(b)o sb.m. 'bearing', from English rumb 'run of the ship'. Derivatives: arrumbar 'bearing'.
- sul sb.m. 'South', from OE suð, from PGmc *sunþiz 'South'.
- tilla sb.f. 'wedge; plank, board, plank floor; deck' ('et garafetar o tillado', 1433), related to French tillac and dial. til(l)e, from PGmc *þeljōn. Derivatives: tillar 'to plank, to board', tillado 'plank floor'.
- tolete sb.m. 'wooden peg (rowlock)' (c. 1750), from French tolet, from Old Norse þollr 'wooden peg in the side of a boat for maintaining the oar in place', PGmc *þullaz idem.
- treu sb.m. 'kind of sail, sail cloth' ('Con que movian de rrijo aos treus alçados', 1264), from Old French tref 'sail, tent', maybe from a Germanic form *trap.
- vaga f. 'wave; small valley, hillock' (c. 1750), from French vague 'wave', itself from Old Norse vágr 'sea, wave' (cf. Swedish våg 'wave'), from PGmc *wēgaz 'wave'. Derivatives: vaguío 'sea swell'.
- varenga sb.f. 'frame of a ship', from French varangue, itself from Old Norse *vrang (cf. Swedish dial. vrang), from PGmc *wrangō 'hold of a ship'.

== Recent Germanic loanwords ==
Some other Germanic words have been incorporated recently, from English, Dutch, French, or Italian, but frequently with the intermediation of Spanish. Among them:

- airón 'heron'.
- alabarda (16th century) 'halberd'
- alodio 'full property'.
- alto 'halt'.
- arcabuz 'type of gun'.
- berbiquí 'carpenter's brace'.
- bloque 'block'
- brea 'tar, pitch'
- brecha 'breach, gap'
- campión 'champion'
- carlinga 'part of a ship' cf. French carlingue 'kelson, keelson', from Old Norse kerling 'woman, kelson, keelson' (> Icelandic kerling, idem)
- chalupa 'boar, launch'
- charpa, echarpe 'baldric'
- chorlo 'ferruginous rocks' < German schorl.
- colza 'oilseed rape'
- dique 'dike'
- equipo, equipar 'equip'
- escaparate 'showcase'
- escarpa 'slope'
- eslinga 'sling' cf. Old French eslinge 'slingshot', 'sling' (> French élingue), from Frankish *slinga
- esquife 'boat' cf. Italian schifo 'little boat' (> French esquif) of Germanic origin. Compare German Schiff 'ship'
- estacha 'string'
- estafeta, from Italian staffetta 'messenger'
- estai 'stay' cf. Old French estai > French étai, from Old English stæġ.
- estampar 'to stamp'
- estofar 'to stew' cf. Old French estofer > French étouffer, from Old High German stopfôn
- estoque 'sword' cf. French estoc 'long and thin sword', from Old Provençal estoc, borrowed in turn from Old French
- esturiom 'sturgeon'
- flanco 'flank'
- forraxe 'fodder, forage' cf. French fourrage, from Old Low Franconian *fodar 'fodder' > Old French fuerre 'straw' + suffix -age
- fútbol 'football'
- garbo 'dignity' < Italian
- grabar 'to carve'
- manequín 'mannequin' cf. French mannequin, from Dutch manneken 'small man'
- marchar 'to go away, to march'
- metralla 'shrapnel'
- mofo, mofa 'rust, mold'
- orinque 'string'
- pífaro 'flute'
- placa 'plate'
- rada 'bay' cf. French rade 'part of the sea that sinks into the land and offers ships anchorages sheltered from the winds and the waves' 'harbour', from Middle English rade, in the meaning of 'roadstead'
- tarxeta 'target'
- trampolín 'springboard'
- tufo 'stink'
- ulla 'soft coal'
- ustaga 'string'
- xardín 'garden' cf. French jardin from Old Low Franconian *gardin-, oblique case of *gardō (related to English yard)

A few words have been taken directly from English navigators during the last centuries:

- brus, English brush.
- piche, English pitch (itself from Latin pix 'tar').

== See also ==
- List of Portuguese words of Germanic origin
- List of Spanish words of Germanic origin
- List of French words of Germanic origin
- Proto-Germanic
- Gothic Language
- List of Galician words of Celtic origin
