= Tron (disambiguation) =

Tron is a 1982 science fiction film produced by Walt Disney Productions.

Tron may also refer to:

== Arts and entertainment ==
=== Tron franchise ===
- Tron (franchise), an American science fiction media franchise begun with the 1982 film Tron
- Tron (character), the titular character of the Tron franchise
- Tron (soundtrack), the soundtrack album for the 1982 film
- Tron (video game), an arcade game based on the 1982 film

=== Other arts ===
- Studio TRON, a comic book and animation studio created by manga artist Kia Asamiya
- The Trons, a self-playing robotic musical group from Hamilton, New Zealand

== Computing ==
- TRON (encoding), a multi-byte character encoding
- TRON command (trace on), a debugging command in the BASIC programming language
- TRON project, a real-time operating system kernel project by Ken Sakamura
- Tron, a block cellular automaton rule
- Tron (blockchain), a cryptocurrency and proof-of-stake blockchain founded in 2017

== Places ==
=== Scotland ===
- Tron (Scotland), a public weighing balance and hence standard weights and measures in the Burghs of medieval Scotland
  - Tron Kirk, a church built at the tron in Edinburgh, Scotland
  - Trongate, a street in Glasgow, Scotland
  - Tron Theatre, a theatre, formerly kirk, in the Glasgow Trongate
  - St George's Tron Church, a Church of Scotland church in Glasgow
  - The Tron Church at Kelvingrove, an evangelical Presbyterian church in Glasgow

=== Elsewhere ===
- Hamilton, New Zealand (nickname: "The Tron")
- Tron district, Uttaradit, Thailand

== Other uses ==
- Tron (hacker) (Boris Floricic; 1972–1998), German computer hacker
- Antonin Tron (born 1984), French fashion designer
- Tron family, a Venetian noble family

== See also ==
- Electron (disambiguation)
- Elektron (disambiguation)
- Etron (disambiguation), including e-tron
- Thon (disambiguation)
- Throne (disambiguation)
- Ton (disambiguation)
- Toon (disambiguation)
- Tron-men, an organization of chimney-sweeps in Edinburgh, Scotland
