= Etron =

Etron or e-tron may refer to:

- étron, see List of French words of Germanic origin (C-G)
- Audi e-tron (brand), "e-tron", a sub-brand of Audi automobiles for all-electric cars
- Audi e-tron (concept car), a series of electric concept cars from Audi
- Audi e-tron (2018), a battery-electric SUV introduced by Audi in 2018
- eTron 3T, a disposable e-cigarette

== See also ==
- Etron Fou Leloublan, a French rock band
- Remington EtronX, an electronic primer ignition system for the Remington Model 700
- "Les hologénies de l’Etron", an exhibition of works by Saülo Mercader
- prince Croqu'étron, a fictional character created by Marguerite de Lubert
- Tron (disambiguation)
- E (disambiguation)
