= Unigray =

- Unigray's location in Gauteng
- Coordinates: 26°14′30″S 28°02′27″E
- Country: South Africa
- Province: Gauteng
- City: Johannesburg
- Established: 1956

Area
  - Total: 0.32 km^{2} (0.12 sq mi)

Population (2011)
  - Total: 1,319
  - Density: 4,122/km^{2} (10,680/sq mi)

Races
  - White: 28.9%
  - Asian: 2.6%
  - Cape Coloured: 10.9%
  - Black: 57.5%
  - Other: 0.2%

Languages
  - Afrikaans: 32.4%
  - Zulu: 18.8%
  - English: 14.3%
  - Other: 34.6%

Unigray is a suburb of Johannesburg, South Africa, around 6 km southeast of City Hall. It lies north of Queenshaven, east of Elladoone, and west of Electron.

== History ==
Unigray is on the western border of Klipriviersberg and Elandsfontein, both once owned by field cornet Jan Meyer). Founded in 1956, it was the last township to emerge on this farm, where Regents Park was the first back in 1904. The name comes from the Union Greyhound Racing Association, though why "grey" was misspelled "gray" is unclear.

== Sources ==
- Potgieter, D.J. (ed.) (1972). Standard Encyclopaedia of Southern Africa. Cape Town: Nasionale Opvoedkundige Uitgewery (Nasou).
- Raper, Peter Edmund (2004). New Dictionary of South African Place Names. Johannesburg/Cape Town: Jonathan Ball Publishers.
- Stals, Prof. Dr. E.L.P (ed.) (1978). Afrikaners in die Goudstad, vol. 1: 1886 - 1924. Cape Town/Pretoria: HAUM.
