= Electron (disambiguation) =

An electron is a subatomic particle.

Electron may also refer to:

== Science ==
- Elementary charge or electron
- Electron (bird), a small genus of motmots

== Places ==
- Electron, Gauteng, a community in Gauteng province, South Africa
- Electron, Washington, a community in Washington, US

== People ==
- Electron (computer hacker) or Richard Jones (born 1969), member of an Australian hacking group
- Lou Fine or E Lectron (1914–1971), American comic book artist

== Organisations ==
- Tokyo Electron, an electronics and semiconductor company
- Electron, a tram builder based in Lviv, Ukraine

== Other uses ==
- Electron (comics), a fictional Marvel Comics character
- Rocket Lab Electron, a small orbital rocket in use by Rocket Lab
- Teignmouth Electron, a trimaran entered in the 1968 Sunday Times Golden Globe Race
- Electron (software framework), an open-source framework for writing desktop apps with web technologies, originally authored by GitHub
- AMC Electron, a re-branding of AMC Amitron, the electric urban vehicle concept by AMC
- Acorn Electron, an 8-bit computer by Acorn Computers
- BlackBerry Electron, a line of smartphones
- Visa Electron, a brand of credit or debit cards
- Electron engine, a video game engine by Obsidian Entertainment
- L-188W "Electron", an Argentine Navy version of the Lockheed L-188 Electra
- Electron Lahar, a mudflow that came from Mount Rainier 500 years ago

== See also ==
- Elektron (resin), an ancient Greek name for Amber, a fossilized resin
- Elektron (disambiguation)
- Electro (disambiguation)
- Electrum, an alloy of gold and silver
- Tron (disambiguation)
