= Electro =

Electro or Elektro or Electros may refer to:

== Music ==
- Electro (music), a genre of electronic music that originated in the early 1980s
- Electronic music in general or its other subgenres such as electro house and electropop

== Fiction ==
- Electro (Marvel Comics), two supervillains featured in Spider-Man comics
  - Electro (Max Dillon)
  - Electro (Francine Frye)
  - Elektro (comics), a fictional robot that appears in comic books published by Timely Comics
- Electro (Transformers), a cartoon character in the Transformers series
- "Electro" (The Mighty Boosh), a 2004 episode of The Mighty Boosh
- "Electro Boy", the first episode of Super Crooks

== Wrestlers ==
- Electroshock (wrestler), veteran luchador, also known as Electro
- Electro (wrestler), holder of the IWA World Heavyweight Championship

== Other ==
- Elektro, the nickname of several robots built by Westinghouse
- Elektro, the currency of the board game Power Grid
- Abbreviation that was used in the printing industry to refer to the electrotyped copy of a forme.
- A Yashica series of cameras (Electro 35, TL Electro, etc.)
- Alisport Silent 2 Electro, an Italian electric motorglider

== See also ==
- Electron (disambiguation)
- Electro Beatbox, a hip hop compilation album released by Decadance Recordings in 2002
- Electro Brain, a video game company
- Electro Glide in Blue, a 1997 album by the British band Apollo 440
- Electro Quarterstaff, an instrumental heavy metal band from Winnipeg, Canada
- Electro Tone Corporation, a company that produced add-ons for Hammond organs in the 1960s and 1970s
- Electrostar, a series of trains used by railroad companies of Great Britain and South Africa.
