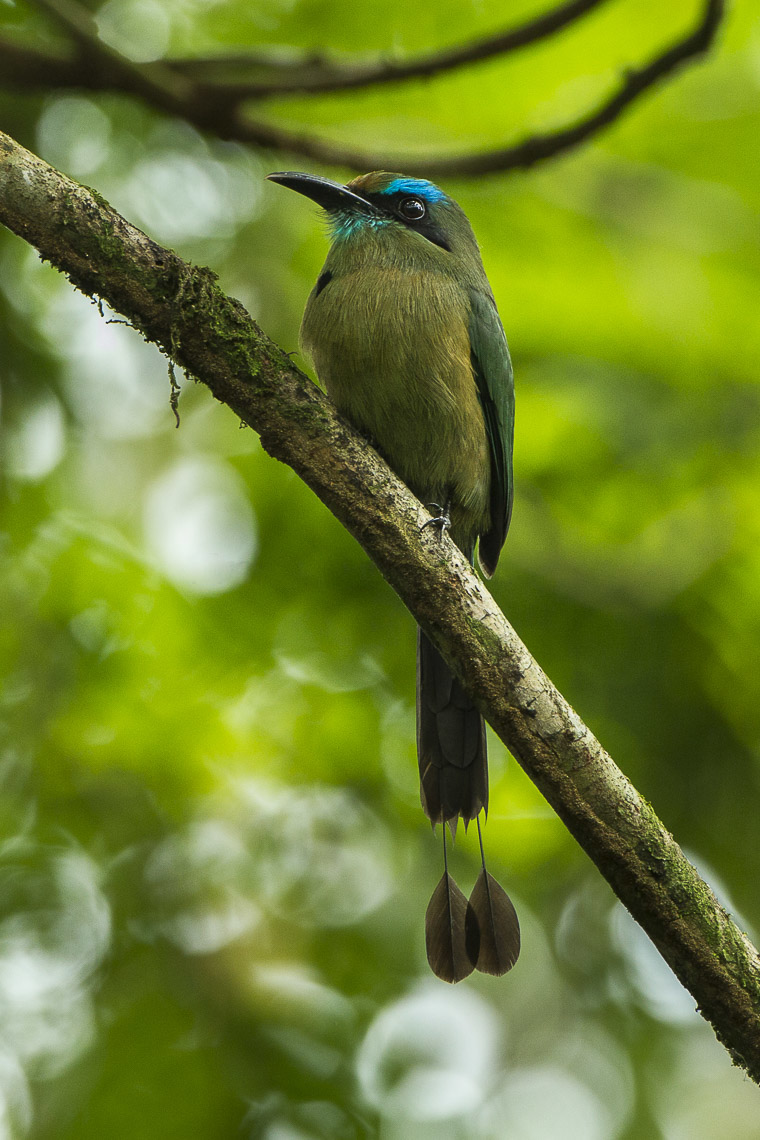

Conservation status
- Vulnerable (IUCN 3.1)

Scientific classification
- Kingdom: Animalia
- Phylum: Chordata
- Class: Aves
- Order: Coraciiformes
- Family: Momotidae
- Genus: Electron
- Species: E. carinatum

Binomial name
- Electron carinatum (Du Bus de Gisignies, 1847)
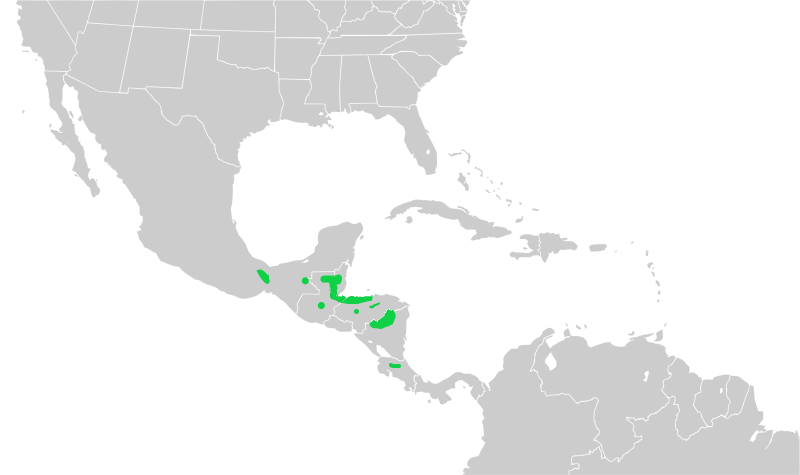

Synonyms
- Pionites carinatus; Prionirhynchus carinatus

= Keel-billed motmot =

Species of bird

The keel-billed motmot (Electron carinatum) is a vulnerable species of bird in the motmot family Momotidae. It is found in Belize, Costa Rica, Guatemala, Honduras, Mexico, and Nicaragua.

== Taxonomy and systematics ==
The keel-billed motmot was formally described as Pionites carinatus. It was later referred to as Prionirhynchus carinatus but eventually was renamed Electron carinatum.

The keel-billed motmot is thought to be closely related to the broad-billed motmot (E. platyrhynchum); they are the only members of the genus Electron. The two may be conspecific. Their plumage is very different but their structure and vocalizations are very similar.

The keel-billed motmot is monotypic.

== Description ==
The keel-billed motmot is 30.5 to 38 cm (12 to 15 in) long; one male weighed 65 g (2.3 oz). It is a smallish member of the motmot family. The sexes have the same plumage. Adults have a rufus forehead and a black "mask" with a turquoise-blue arc above it on an otherwise green face. Their upper parts are also green. Their chin is pale turquoise. Their underparts are mostly rufous in the northern part of their range becoming greenish to greenish cinnamon in the south. Their chest has a black spot. Their tail is green; its central pair of feathers are elongated and end in racquets. Their bill is black with a horn-colored tip, long, very broad, and flattened side-to-side with a significant ridge on the culmen and serrated edges.

== Distribution and habitat ==
The keel-billed motmot has a disjunct distribution along the Caribbean side of Central America. It ranges intermittently from Veracruz and Oaxaca in southern Mexico south through Guatemala, Belize, Honduras, and Nicaragua into northern Costa Rica as far as southern Alajuela Province. The keel-billed motmot inhabits humid evergreen forest, and favors steep-sided gullies with streams. In elevation it reaches 1,600 m (5,200 ft) in northern Central America but ranges only between 300 and 900 m (1,000 and 3,000 ft) in Costa Rica.

== Behavior ==
=== Movement ===
The keel-billed motmot has no recorded migratory behavior.

=== Feeding ===
The keel-billed motmot forages mostly in the forest's mid-story. It captures prey in mid-air ("hawking") or from vegetation or the ground with sallies from a perch. Details of its diet and other foraging behavior are not known, but are assumed to be similar to those of the broad-billed motmot. That species feeds mostly on insects but includes other arthropods and small frogs, lizards, and snakes in its diet; fruit makes a very small percentage of its diet.

=== Breeding ===
Very little is known about the keel-billed motmot's breeding biology. Its breeding season appears to include January to March. It is known to nest in burrows, in some areas in steep earthen stream banks and at one location in Belize in unexcavated Mayan structures.

=== Vocalization ===
The keel-billed motmot's vocalizations are very similar to those of the broad-billed motmot. It makes "a loud, far-carrying, low-pitched, nasal 'cuaet cuaet cadack' or 'ohhng' ".

== Status ==
The IUCN originally in 1988 assessed the keel-billed motmot as Threatened but since 2000 as Vulnerable. It has a relatively large but fragmented range. Its estimated population of between 1500 and 7000 mature individuals is believed to be decreasing. In most areas it is threatened by continuing habitat loss due to logging, conversion to banana plantations, other agriculture, and ranching, and to human settlement. It does not appear to be under serious threat in Belize. As of 2020 there were very few recent records in Mexico. It is considered rare to uncommon in northern Central America and rare in Costa Rica. It occurs in some protected areas in Belize and Costa Rica. It "[r]emains poorly known and inexplicably absent from what appear to be suitable areas; there is a need to clarify its current range, more precisely estimate its population, determine its true conservation status and better understand its ecological requirements."
