= Mercader =

Mercader is a Catalan family name. It may refer to:

- Caridad Mercader (1892–1975), Spanish communist militant and Soviet agent
- Maria Mercader (1965–2020), American journalist and news producer
- María Mercader (1918–2011), Spanish film actress and wife of film director Vittorio De Sica
- Ramón Mercader (1913–1978), Spanish Communist, known for assassinating Leon Trotsky
- Saülo Mercader (born 1944), Spanish artist
