= Dona Lluna =

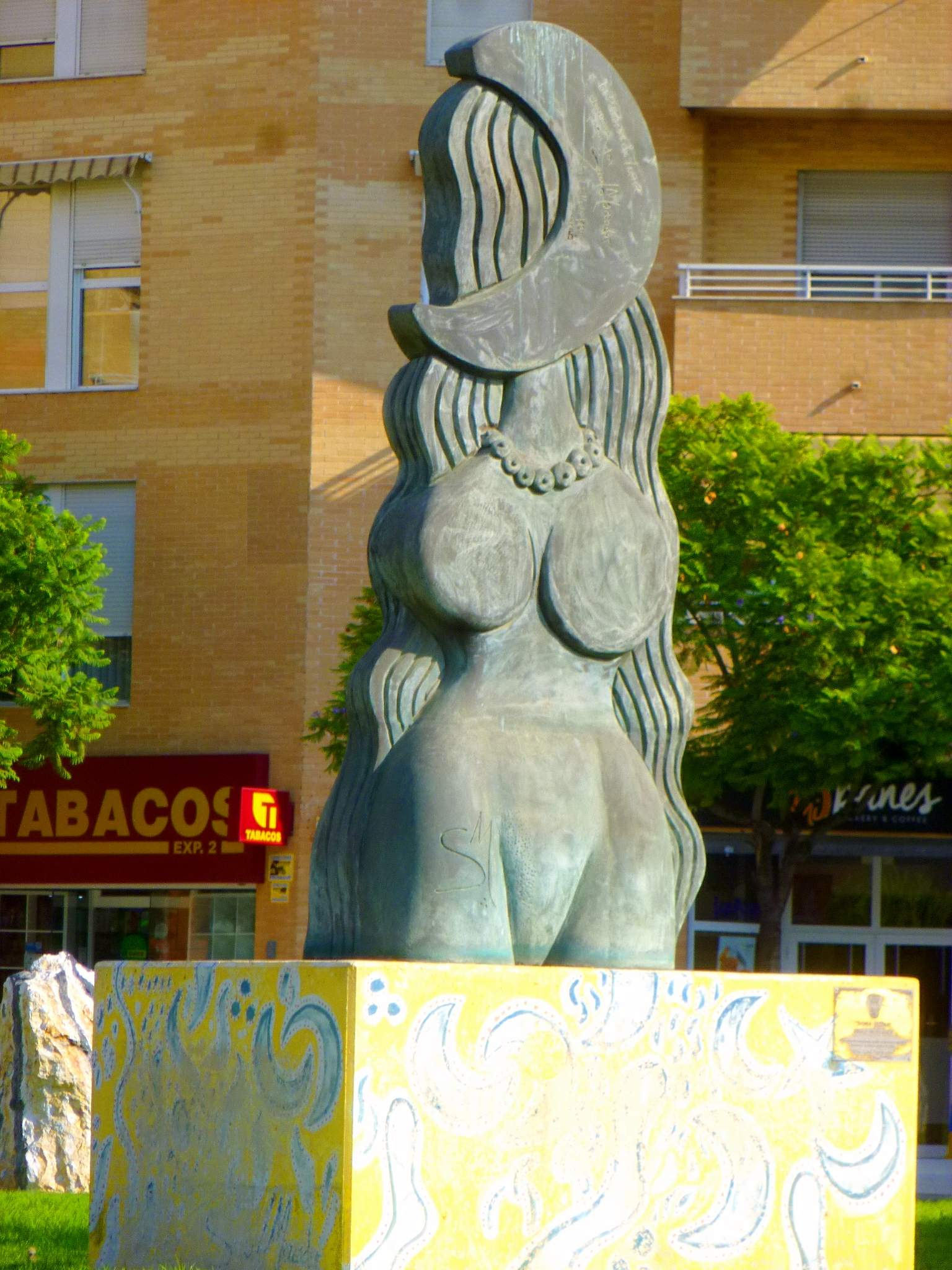
- Artist: Saülo Mercader
- Medium: Bronze
- Location: San Vicente del Raspeig, Spain
- 38.394177°N 0.51485°W

Dona Lluna: A Tribute to Womankind is a sculpture by Saülo Mercader, standing in the middle of a rotunda, in the heart of the City of Sant Vicent del Raspeig, the home of Alicante University, in Southeastern Spain. It was unveiled on March 11, 2007 by local dignitaries and a symphony orchestra from Madrid.

The sculpture, representing the shape of a powerful and massive female body, weighs 2 tons and is 4 metres high. The sculpture is surrounded by twelve painted stones ( 2 metres high) forming a lunar calendar.

It is inspired by Saülo Mercader's birth in 1944, in a mansion called Los Molinos in the city of San Vicente del Raspeig where he lived for the first five years of his childhood. Dona Lluna is a Valencian name which means Moon Lady. It is engraved with the statement, "Aquí nací, aquí doy" ("I was born here, I give–her this work of art–here").
