= Elektron =

Elektron may refer to:

- Elektron (alloy), a magnesium alloy
- Elektron (company), a musical instrument company
- Elektron (ISS), a Russian oxygen generator
- Elektron (resin) or amber, a fossilised resin
- Elektron (satellite), a series of four Soviet particle physics satellites

== See also ==
- Electron, a subatomic particle
- Electron (disambiguation)
- Tron (disambiguation)
