= Throne (disambiguation) =

A throne is a seat of state for a potentate or dignitary.

Throne, Thrones or The Throne may also refer to:

== Arts and entertainment ==
- Thrones (band), a solo project of bassist Joe Preston
- The Throne, a collaboration pseudonym for rappers Jay-Z and Kanye West (as on Drake's "Pop Style")
- "Throne" (song), a single from the 2015 album That's the Spirit by Bring Me the Horizon
- "The Throne", a song by Blind Guardian on their 2015 album Beyond the Red Mirror
- The Throne (film), a 2015 South Korean film
- Sinhasan or The Throne, a 1979 Indian Marathi-language political drama film
- "The Throne", a poem by Carol Ann Duffy that was written for the 60th anniversary of Queen Elizabeth II's coronation

== Other uses ==
- Throne.com, a website designed for online content creators to receive gifts from fans
- Throne (surname)
- Throne (angel), a rank of angels in Christianity
- Throne, Alberta, Canada, an unincorporated community
