= Tron-men =

Organization of chimney-sweepers in Edinburgh

The tron-men (or tronmen) of Edinburgh were an organization of chimney-sweepers named after the Tron, a weighing-beam which was also used as a pillory, that stood outside the Tron Kirk.

They effectively acted as a trade guild or trade union for chimney-sweeping in Edinburgh. Their activities are described in Volume II of Kay's Edinburgh Portraits. They are also depicted in a drawing by David Allen, and mentioned in an 1811 regulation made by Edinburgh Town Council.

The authors of Kay's Edinburgh Portraits describe the tron-men's appearance thus: "They wore flat bonnets—a coat peculiarly formed—and knee-breeches and buckles—with a short apron, A ladder—a besom—with a coil of ropes and a ball, completed their equipment."

The name "trone-men" was in use as early as 1705, in the work Observator; or, A dialogue between a country-man, & a landwart school-master. The tron-men are also referred to in Maitland's The History of Edinburgh, published in 1753.

In 1795, one of their members was expelled for assisting in a hanging. They were effectively disbanded by 1811.
