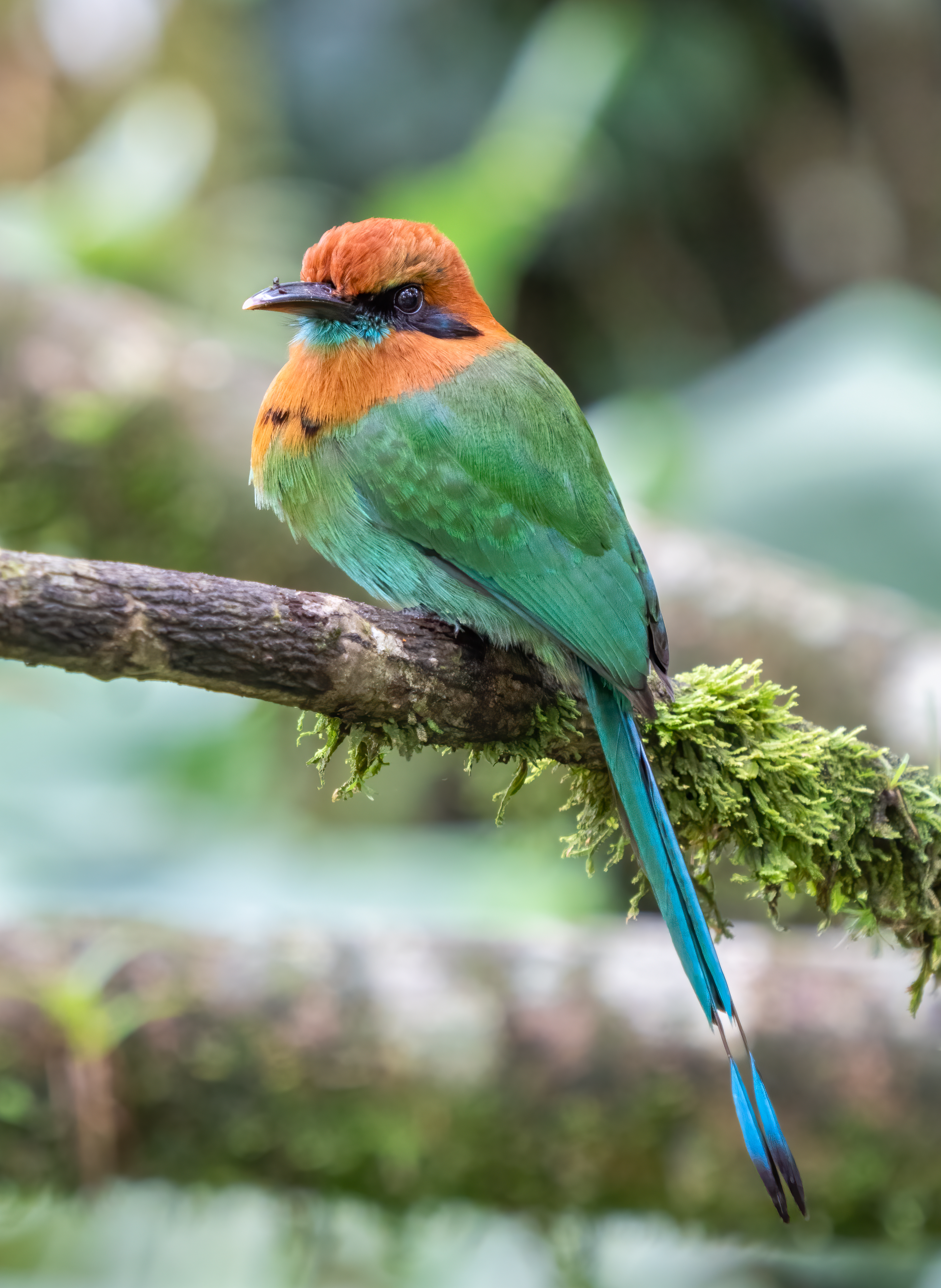

Conservation status
- Least Concern (IUCN 3.1)

Scientific classification
- Kingdom: Animalia
- Phylum: Chordata
- Class: Aves
- Order: Coraciiformes
- Family: Momotidae
- Genus: Electron
- Species: E. platyrhynchum

Binomial name
- Electron platyrhynchum (Leadbeater, 1829)
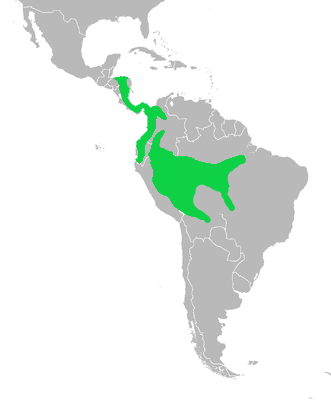

= Broad-billed motmot =

Species of bird

The broad-billed motmot (Electron platyrhynchum) is a fairly common Central and South American bird of the Momotidae family. They are nonmigratory, sedentary birds that are most frequently seen in singles or pairs. There exist six subspecies of the broad-billed motmot.

== Description ==
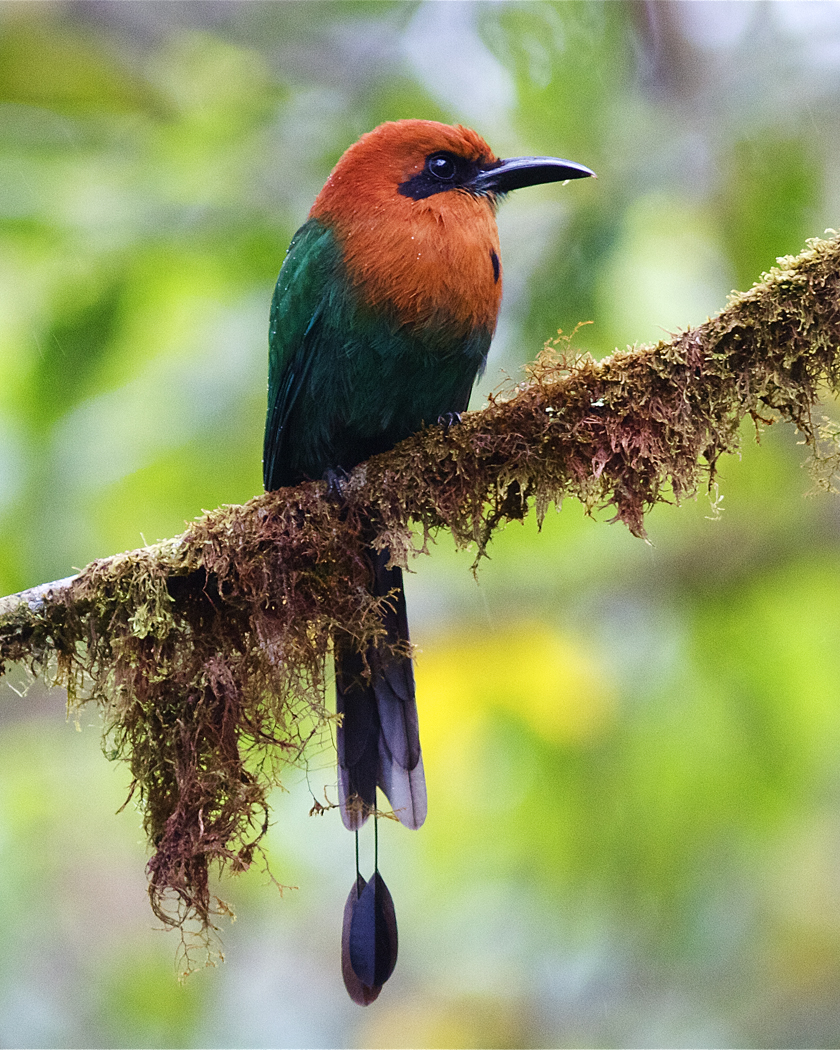
showing racquet-shaped central tail feathers

At about 12 inches long, the broad-billed motmot is one of the smallest members of the family Momotidae. These birds weigh 60 grams on average. They have dark eyes and feet. Most of its upper body, including its head, neck and chest, is a cinnamon-rufous colour. There is a black patch on either side of its head that covers the cheeks and auricular area, as well as one on the centre of its chest. The lower half of its body is more greenish above and becomes more blueish below. The broad-billed motmot has a long tail that gradually changes from blue to black. It also has two racquet-shaped central feathers are much longer than the rest. As its name suggests, the broad-billed motmot has a broad, flattened bill. Its bill is black, has serrated edges, and has a keel on the upper mandible. This species does not demonstrate sexual dimorphism, which means that both the male and female look alike.

Juveniles of this species are duller and darker than the adults. They also have white on their bill and a blue-green streak over their eye.

The broad-billed motmot looks nearly identical to the rufous motmot (Baryphthengus martii) but it has a few discerning characteristics. It is smaller and has a larger black patch compared to the rufous motmot, as well as a blue-green chin.

== Taxonomy ==
The broad-billed motmot is a part of the family Momotidae, in the order Coraciiformes.

This species has six subspecies, three of which make up a distinctive group that some consider to be their own species. They are called the "plain-tailed motmots" and this is because they lack tail racquets.

	Subspecies name	Distribution
Broad-billed motmot (broad-billed) platyhynchum Group	Electron platyrhynchum minus	Eastern Honduras to Eastern Panama.
Broad-billed motmot (broad-billed) platyhynchum Group	Electron platyrhynchum platyrhynchum	West of the Andes from Northwest Colombia to Southwest Ecuador.
Broad-billed motmot (broad-billed) platyhynchum Group	Electron platyrhynchum colombianum	Northern Colombia lowlands to Boyacá following the Magdalena River.
Broad-billed motmot (plain-tailed) pyrrholaemum Group	Electron platyrhynchum pyrrholaemum	East of the Andes from South-Central Colombia to Eastern Ecuador, as well as Peru and Bolivia.
Broad-billed motmot (plain-tailed) pyrrholaemum Group	Electron platyrhynchum orienticola	Upper Amazonian Brazil.
Broad-billed motmot (plain-tailed) pyrrholaemum Group	Electron platyrhynchum chlorophrys	Central Brazil, South of the Amazon.

== Habitat and distribution ==
Its range encompasses the eastern side of Central America from Honduras to Panama, and it extends into many countries in north-western South America, including Colombia, Ecuador, Peru, Bolivia, and Brazil.

This bird resides in humid forests, warm lowlands and foothills, and is found at elevations below 3,000 ft (910 m).

== Behaviour ==
=== Vocalizations ===
The family Momotidae is small, but they have a wide variety of sounds. The broad-billed motmot's most utilized vocalization is its song, which they most often give at dawn. It is described as a nasal "cwaah" sound and it is generally repeated at long intervals, but it is sometimes done as a shorter and faster sequence, or as a duet. Their call, which is heard less commonly, is a quiet string of "tuk" sounds that occasionally develops into a rattle.

=== Diet ===
The broad-billed motmot is considered to be primarily insectivorous. Their diet is made up in large part by insects and their larvae. However, they also feed on spiders, centipedes, scorpions, as well as some small vertebrates such as snakes, frogs, and lizards. When they are in season and abundant, this bird will predominantly eat cicadas. Unlike other species of the Momotidae family, broad-billed motmots do not consume fruits.

This bird species hunts in a way that saves energy, by examining their surroundings until they spot a prey of interest. They then perform a hunting method called a "sally-strike" to snatch their prey, before returning to their perch to feed.

=== Reproduction ===
In Costa Rica, the broad-billed motmot lays its eggs between February and May. On average, this species has a clutch size of 2 or 3 eggs. These socially monogamous birds nest in an earth-bank burrow and both parents take turns incubating the eggs, though the females often have longer shifts. It is not known exactly for how long broad-billed motmot eggs are incubated. The birds hatch both naked and blind, and parents also share the responsibility of feeding their young.

== Conservation status ==
The broad-billed motmot is considered to be a species of least concern by the IUCN Red List of 2016. It is common within its range, but populations are being negatively affected by deforestation.
