= Throne (surname) =

Throne is a surname. Notable people with the surname include:

- Malachi Throne (1928–2013), American actor
- Mary Throne (born 1960), American politician
