= List of French words of Germanic origin (C-G) =

This list of French words of Germanic origin consists of Standard Modern French words and phrases deriving from any Germanic language of any period.

== Scope ==
The following list details words, affixes and phrases that contain Germanic etymons.

Words where only an affix is Germanic (e.g. méfait, bouillard, carnavalesque) are excluded, as are words borrowed from a Germanic language where the origin is other than Germanic, (for instance, cabaret is from Dutch, but the Dutch word is ultimately from Latin/Greek, so it is omitted).

Likewise, words which have been calqued from a Germanic tongue (e.g. pardonner, bienvenue, entreprendre, toujours, compagnon, plupart, manuscrit, manoeuvre), or which received their usage or sense (i.e. were created, modified or influenced) due to Germanic speakers or Germanic linguistic habits (e.g. comté, avec, commun, on, panne, avoir, ça) are not included.

Many other Germanic words found in older versions of French, such as Old French and Anglo-French are no longer extant in Standard Modern French. Many of these words do, however, continue to survive dialectally and in English. See: List of English Latinates of Germanic origin.

== C ==
- cabot "dog" ( alt. of clabaud "loud barking dog" < claber < Gmc, cf Dut kabbard "chatterer")
- cafignon ( < Frk *kaf "thimble" < Gmc, cf Germ Kaff "ball, lump of dough", Fr eschafillon "nutshell")
- cagot "bigot" (Uncertain origin, two hypotheses posit: < cagot "hypocrite" < Prov câ "dog" + Gothi "Goths"; or < Prov cagot "infidel" < Prov cap "head" + "Germ Gott "God")
  cagote
  cagoterie
  cagotisme
- cague ( < Dut kaghe, kaag < Gmc)
- cahot
  cahoteux
- cahoter "to jolt" ( < Frk *hottōn, hottisōn "to shake" < Gmc, cf Dut hotten "to shake")
  cahot
  cahotage
  cahotant
  cahoté
  cahotement
- cahute "hut, ship's cabin" ( < Du kajuit)
- caille "quail" ( < OFr quaille < ML quaquila, quaccula < Frk *kwakkula < Gmc, cf MDu kwackele, OHG quahtala "quail")
- caillebotter (also cailleboter) ( < caille + botter < Gmc)
  cailleboté (also cailleboté)
  caillebotis (also caillebotis)
  caillebotte
- caillou "flint, stone, pebble" ( < Dut kai, kei "stone" < Gmc, cf Germ kiesel "stone, pebble")
  caillouteux
  cailloutage
  caillouter
  cailloutis
- caillouter
  caillouté
- cajute
- cake
  cake-walk
- cale "wedge, support" ( < Germ Keil < Gmc)
  cale-pied
  caler "to support, steady, fix"
  décaler
- caler
  calé
  calée
  calance (also calence)
  calage
- calfeutrer
  calfeutrage
  calfeutrement
- caliborgne
  caliborgnon
- calot "nut" ( < écale < Frk *skala < Gmc)
- cambrousse (also cambrouse)
  cambrousard
  cambrousarde
  cambrousier
- cambuse "(naut.) cook's room" ( < Eng caboose < Gmc)
  cambusier
- came ( < Germ Kamm "comb" < Gmc)
- camembert
- camerlingue
  camerlinguat
- camion-stop
- camisard
- camoufler "to camouflage" ( < Ital camuffare "to disguise" + MFr camoufflet "puff of smoke" < MFr moufflet < Germ Muffel < Gmc)
  camouflage
  camoufle
  camouflet
  camoufleur
  camoufleuse
- canamelle
- canard "drake, male duck" ( < OFr quanart < quane "little boat" < Gmc + -art, -ard < Gmc, cf Germ kahn "floater, little boat")
  canarder
  canardière
  canardeau
  canardier
  cane
- canarder
  canardement
- canasson
- cancan
  cancanage
  cancaner
  cancanier
  cancanière
- cane "duck" ( < OFr quane "little boat" < Gmc, cf Germ kahn "floater, little boat")
  caner
  canette
  caneton
  cannot
- canesou (also canezou)
- canette ( < cane < OFr quane < Gmc)
- canette "beer-jug" ( < Fr cane < Germ kanne "a can" < Gmc *kanna)
  canon
- canif "penknife" ( < OFr < Frk *knīf and ON knífr < Gmc *knībaz "knife")
- cannot "canoe, little boat"
  canotage
  canoter
  canotier
  canotière
- cap-hornier
- capre
- caquer "to cure (fish)" ( < OFr quaquer < MDu kaaken)
  caque
  caquage
  caqueur
  caqûre
  encaquer
- caquelon
- caqueter "to cackle" ( < Gmc, cf ME cakelen, Du kakelen, MLG kākeln, Swed kackla)
  caquet
  caquetage
  caquetant
  caquète
  caqueterie
  caqueteur
  caqueteuse
  caquetoire
  caquette
- carapater
  carapate (also carapata)
  carapatin
- carcan "pillory" ( < OFr quercant < Gmc, cf OHG querca "throat")
- cargo-boat
- cargo-stop
- carle
- carlin "a pug, pug dog" ( < Carolinus < Gmc)
- carlingue
  carlingage
- carlisme
  carliste
- carolus
  carolin
  caroline
  carolingien
  carolingienne
  carolingisme
- carpe "carp"
  carpé
  carpeau (also carpiau)
  carpillon
- casse "crucible" ( < LL caza < OHG kezi "stove")
  casseau
- casse-pattes
  casserole
- casserole "saucepan"
  casserolée
- Catalan
  catalane
- catgut
- cauchemar "nightmare" ( < cauche- "to press" + mar "demon, mare" < Gmc, cf Germ Nachtmar "nightmare")
  cauchemarder
  cauchemaresque
- cauchemarder
  cauchemardant
  cauchemardante
  cauchemardesque (also cauchemaresque)
- cent-garde
- cep "stock" ( < Lat cippus "stake, beam" < Gmc, cf OE cipp "beam, chip of wood", Dut kip "strip of wood")
  cepage
  cèpe
  cépée
  receper
- chabraque "cloths laid on a cavalry horse"
- chadburn
- chagrin "sorrow, affliction"
  chagriner
- chagriner
  chagrinant
  chagriné
- chainse
- chairman
- chalon
- chaloupe "shallop"
  chalouper
  chaloupier
- chalouper
  chaloupé
- chambellan "chamberlain"
  chambellage
- chambranler
  chambranle
- chambrelan
- chamois "chamois"
  chamoiser
  chamoisine
- chamoiser
  chamoisage
  chamoisé
  chamoiserie
  chamoiseur
- chanlatte
- charlemagne
  charlemagne faire
- charleston
- charlot
  charlotte
- charlotte
- charlottine
- charolais (also charollais)
  charolaise (also charollaise)
- chasse-bosses
- chasse-marée
- chat "trade ship"
  chatte
- chat-huant "screech owl"
- chatiron (ceramics) ( < Germ Schattierung "nuance" < Gmc)
  chatironner
- chatironner
  chatironné
- chatterton
- chaton "bezel"
- chatouiller "to tickle" ( < ML *catilare, cattuliare "to tickle" < Gmc, cf OHG kizzilōn "to tickle", Dut katelen, kietelen "to tickle", ON kitla, OE citelan "to kittle, tickle")
- chausse-trappe "caltrop"
- chelem
- chemise "chemise, shirt" ( < OFr chamisae < Lat camisia < Gmc *khamiþi-, cf OHG hamidi, hemidi "shirt", OE hemeþe "shirt"; cf OIr caimis & Welsh camse from the same Gmc source)
  chemiser
  chemiserie
  chemisette
  chemisier
  chemisière
- chemiser
  chemisage
- chenapan "scamp"
- chewing-gum
- chic "chic, elegant, stylish" ( < Fr < Germ schick "skill" < Gmc)
  chiquement
- chicaner
  chicane
  chicanerie
  chicaneur
  chicaneuse
  chicanier
- chicard
- chiche
- chicoter
  chicot
  chicote
  chicotte
- chiffe "rag" ( < chiffre "worthless thing" < OFr chipe < ME chippe "chip, shard, small piece" < OE cipp < Gmc, cf MLG & MDu kippen "to chip eggs, hatch")
  chiffon
- chiffon
  chiffonner
  chiffonnier
  chiffonnière
- chiffonner
  chiffonnable
  chiffonnade
  chiffonnage
  chiffonnant
  chiffonné
  chiffonnerie
- chigner
- chiner
  chine
  chiné
  chinée
- chipe
  chiper
  chipette
  chipoter
- chiper
  chiperie
  chipeur
  chipeuse
- chipie
- chipoter
  chipotage
  chipoterie
  chipoteur
  chipoteuse
  chipotier
  chipotière
- chips
- chiquage
- chique "ball, game ball" ( < Germ dial Schick "ball" from schicken "to send" < Gmc)
  chiquenaude
- chiquenaude
  chiquenauder
- chiquer "to chew" ( < Germ schicken "to deliver blows", lit "to send" < Gmc)
  chique
  chiqué
  chiquet
- chiquer ( < chic < Gmc)
  chiquement
- chiquet
  chiqueter
- choc "shock, jolt"
- chocotte
- choisir "to choose"
  choisi
  choisie
  choix
  choisisseuse
  choisisseur
- chope "beer glass"
  chopine
- choper
- chopine
  chopiner
- chopper "to stumble"
  chopin
- choquer "to shock, jolt"
  choc
  choquable
  choquant
  choqué
  choquement
- chouan
  chouanner
  chouannerie
- chouc
- choucas "daw, jackdaw"
- choucroute "sauerkraut"
- chouette "owl, owlet"
- chouque
  chouquet
- cible "target"
- cingler "to sail"
  cinglage
  cinglant
  cinglante
  cinglé
- cippe
- ciron
  cironné
  cironnée
- clabaud "liar"
  clabauder
- clabauder
  clabaudage
  clabauderie
  clabaudeur
  clabaudeuse
- clabot (also crabot)
  clabotage
- claboter
- clac
- clam
- clamecer (also clamser)
- clamp
  clampage
  clamper
- clampin
- clamser (also cramser, crampser)
- clan (also clamp)
- clapet "valve"
- clapir
  clapier
- clapoter "to clap, chop, splash"
  clapot
  clapotage
  clapotant
  clapotement
  clapotis
- clapper "to clap"
  clappement
- claque "smack, slap"
  claque-bois
  claque-bosse
  claque-dent
  claque-des-genoux
  claque-faim
  claque-merde
  claque-oreille
  claque-patin (also claque-patins)
  claque-soif
  claquedent
  claquemurer
  claquer
  claquage
- claquemurer
  claquemuré
- claquer
  claquant
  claqué
  claquement
  claqueur
  claquet
  claquette
  claquoir
- claquet
  claqueter
- clatir
- clenche
- clic
- cliche
  clichage
- clicher "to stereotype"
  cliche
  cliché
  clichement
  clicherie
  clicheur
- client-relais
- clifoire
- clin
- clinfoc
- clinquant "tinsel"
- clip
  clipper
- cliquart
- clique
- cliquer (doublet of clicher) "to stereotype"
  cliques
  cliquet
  cliquette
- cliqueter "to click, clack"
  cliquètement
  cliquettement
  cliquetis
- clisse
  clissage
  clisser
- cliver "to cleave" ( < Eng "cleave" < Gmc)
  clivable
  clivage
  cliveur
- cloche "bell"
  cloche-pied
  clochard
  clocher
  clochement
  clocher-porche
  clochette
  clocheter
- clochard
  clocharde
  clochardiser
- clochardiser
  clochardisation
- clocher
  clochant
- clocheter
  clocheton
  clochetonné
  clocheteur
- cobalt "cobalt"
- cocagne "cockayne"
- cocarde "cockade"
- clopée
- clopiner
  clopin-clopant
  clopinement
- cloque
  cloquage
  cloquer
- cloquer
  cloqué
- clown
  clownerie
  clownesque
- club
  clubiste
  clubman
- coachman
- cob
- cobalt
- cobourgeois
- cocagne
- cocard (also coquard)
  cocarde
  cocardeau (also coquardeau)
  cocarder
  cocarderie
  cocardier
  cocardière
  cocardisme
  cocasse
- cocasse
  cocassement
  cocasserie
  cocassier
- cocâtre
- coche ("bad lesson")
- cochet
- cochevis
- cocker
- cockney
- cockpit
- cocktail
- coiffe "cap, headdress" ( < OFr < LL cofia, cofea "helmet" < Frk *kufja, kuffja < Gmc, cf MHG kupfe "cap")
  coiffage
  coiffer
  coiffette
  coiffière
  coiffis
  décoiffer
- coiffer
  coiffant
  coiffé
  coiffeur
  coiffeuse
  coiffure
- coke "coke, coal by-product"
- coke
  cokerie
  cokier
- colbertisme
- colbertiste
- cold-cream
- colimaçon
- colin
- colin-tampon
- colistier
- colt
- coltis
- colza "rapeseed"
- combuger
- condom ( < Eng < Ital < Gmc)
- contre-attaque
  contre-attaquer
- contre-bouter
- contre-choc
- contre-danse
- contre-digue
- contre-espion
  contre-espionnage
- contre-garde
- contre-guet
- contre-hacher
- contre-haut (also contre-haut en)
- contre-hermine
- contre-heurtoir
- contre-latte
- contre-tirer
- contrebande
  contrebandier
  contrebandière
- contrebord (also contrebord à)
- contrebuche
- contrebuter
- contrechoc
- contredanse
  contredanser
- contreguérilla
- contremarche
- contremarque
  contremarquer
- contreplaqué
- contrescarpe
- contresens
- coq "cock"
  coq-à-l'âne
  coquard
  coquarde (also cocarde)
  coquardeau
  coquart
  coquassier
  coquâtre
  coquelicot
  coqueret (watchmaking term)
  coquet (also cochet)
  coqueter
  coquetier
  coquette
  coqueleur
  coquebin
  coquebine
  coqueleux
  coquelicot
  coqueliner
  coquelourde
- coquelle
- coqueron ("cook-room")
- coquet "cockerel"
  coquetage
  coqueter
  coquettement
  coquetterie
- coquet "coquettish"
  coquetage
  coqueter
  coquettement
  coquetterie
- coquin "scoundrel"
  coquine
  coquinement
  coquinerie
  coquinet
  coquinette
- corned-beef
- cornemuser
  cornemuse
  cornemuseur
  cornemuseux
- corroyer "to curry (leather)"
  corroi
  corroierie
  corroyage
  corroyeur
- cosse "shell, husk, pod" ( < Gmc, cf Germ Schote "pod", Dut schosse)
  cossette
  cossu
  cossue
  écosser
- cosy
  cosy-corner
- cotereaux
- coterie "coterie"
- cotidal
- cotillon "petticoat"
  cotillonner
- cotillonner
  cotillonneur
  cotillonneuse
- cotre
- cottage
- cotte "coat"
  cotte-hardie
  cottereaux (also cotereaux)
  cotteron
  cottille
  cottillon
- couque ("cake")
- courte-botte
- couvre-guidon
- couvre-képi
- couvre-poche
- cover-coat (also covercoat)
- cover-girl
- cow-boy
- cow-pox
- crabe "crab"
  crabier
  crevette
- crabot
  crabotage
- crac "crack"
  craquer
- cracher "to spit"
  crachement
  crachat
  craché
  cracheur
  cracheuse
  crachin
  crachis
  crachoir
  crachoter
  crachouiller
- crachoter
  crachotement
- crack
  cracking
- crailler
  craillement
- cramique
- crampe "cramp"
  crampser (also cramser)
- crampon "cramp-iron"
  cramponner
  cramponnet
- cramponner
  cramponnement
- cran
  créner
  cranter
- cranequin
  cranequinier
- cranter
  crantage
- crapahut
  crapahuter
- crapaud "toad"
  crapauderie
  crapaudière
  crapaudine
  crapoussin
- craper "to creep"
- crapette
- crapouiller
  crapouillage
  crapouilleur
  crapouillot
- crapouillot
  crapouillotage
  crapouilloter
  crapouilloteur
- craquer "to crack"
  craquant
  craque
  craqué
  craqueler
  craquelin
  craquement
  craquerie
  craqueter
  craqueur
  craqueuse
- craqueler
  craquelage
  craquelé
  craquelée
  craquèlement
  craquellement
  craquelure
- craquelin
  craquelot
- craqueter
  craquètement
- crawl
  crawler
- crawler
  crawlé
  crawleur
  crawleuse
- crayon-feutre
- crayon-marqueur
- crèche "crib"
  crécher
- crémaillère "pothook"
  crémaillon
- créner
  créneau
  crénelé
  créneler
- creps ("craps")
- créquier
- créseau
- cresson "watercress"
  cressonnière
- creton "indent" ( < MDu kerte)
- crevette "shrimp"
- criailler
  criaillement
  criaillerie
  criailleur
  criailleuse
- cric "screw-jack"
- cric-crac
- cricket
- cricri (also cri-cri)
- crier ( < ML crīdāre < Frk *krītan "to proclaim, cry out" < Gmc *krītanan, cf MDu krīten, MHG krīzen, Dut krijten "to cry")
  cri
  criage
  criailler
  criant
  criard
  criarde
  criée
  crierie
  crieur
  crieuse
- crique "creek"
- criquer
- criquet "cricket"
- crisser
  crissant
  crissement
- croasser "to croak"
  croassant
  croassement
  croasseur
- croc "hook"
  croc-en-jambe
  croche
  croche-pied
  crochet
  crochu
  croché
  accrocher
  décrocher
- crochet "small hook"
  crochetage
  crocheter
  crocheteur
- crochu "hooked"
- cromorne
- croquer "to crunch"
  croquant
  croquante
  croque-au-sel (also croque-au-sel à la)
  croque-mitaine (also croquemitaine)
  croque-monsieur
  croque-mort (also croquemort)
  croque-note (also croquenote)
  croquenot
  croquet
  croquette
  croqueur
  croqueuse
  croquis
  croquignole
  croquignolet
- croquis "sketch"
- crosse
  crosser
  crossette
- crosser
  crossé
  crosses
  crosseur
- crotte "mud"
  crotter
  décrotter
  crottin
- crotter
  crotté
- crouler (sound) ( < MDu grollen < Gmc)
  croulant
  croulante
  croule
  croulement
  croulier
- croup "croup" ( < Eng croup < Gmc)
  croupal
- croupe "rump"
  croupetons (also croupetons à)
  croupière
  croupion
  croupier
  croupir
  croupon
- croupier "croupier"
- croupion "rump"
  croupionner
- croupir "to stagnate"
  croupi
  croupissant
  croupissement
  croupissoir
  croupissure
- crown-glass
- cruchade
- cruche
  cruchon
- cryptopetit-bourgeois
- cuffat
- cul-blanc
- culbuter
  culbute
  culbuté
  culbuteur
  culbutis
- culotte-short
- cupro-nickel (also cupronickel)
- cupro-potassique (also cupropotassique)
- cutter "cutter"

== D ==
- dahlia "dahlia"
- dail
- dailler
- dalle
  dallage
  daller
  dalot
- daller
  dallé
- daltonien
- daltonisme
- dame "dam"
  damer
  damage
  dameret
  damier
- dancing
- dandin
  dandine
  dandiner
- dandiner
  dandinement
  dandinette
- dandy "dandy"
  dandysme
- danois ( < Frk *danisk < Gmc)
  danoise
- danser "to dance" ( < OFr dancer, dancier < Frk *dansjan, dansōn < Gmc *þen- to stretch, cf OHG dansōn to stretch out, stretch out the arms as if motioning)
  dansable
  dansant
  danse
  danseur
  danseuse
  dansoter (also dansotter)
  contredans
- dard "dart"
  darder
  dare-dare (also dare dare)
- darne ("stunned") ( < Frk *darn "dumbfounded" < Gmc)
- daron
  daronne
- darwinien
  darwinienne
- darwinisme
- darwiniste
- daube
  dauber
  daubière
- dauber "to cuff"
  daubeur
- dead-heat
- débâcher
- débâcler ( < dé- + bâcler < Du bakkelen < MDu bakken "to adhere" < Gmc)
  débâcle
- déballer "to unpack"
  déballage
  déballé
  déballement
  déballeur
- débander "to disband"
  débandade
  débandement
- débanquer
- débarder "to unload"
  débardage
  débardeur "unloader, lighterman"
- débâtir
- débaucher ("to debauch")
  débauchage
  débauché
  débauchée
  débaucheur
  débaucheuse
- déblayer "to clear, grow corn"
  déblai
  déblaiement
  déblayage
  déblayé
  déblayeur
- débleuir
- débloquer ("to erect a blockade")
  déblocage
- déboiser
  déboisage
  déboisé
  déboisement
- débonder
  débondage
  débondement
  débondonner
- déborder "to overflow, overreach"
  débord
  débordant
  débordé
  débordement
- débosseler
- débotter
  débotté
- débotteler
- déboucher
  débouchage
  débouché
  débouchement
  débouchoir
- debout "on end"
- débouter "to nonsuit"
- déboutonner
  déboutonnage
  déboutonné
- débrayer
- débredouiller
- débrider
  débridé
  débridement
- débringuer
  débringué
- débris "debris"
- débrouiller
  débrouillage
  débrouillard
  débrouillardise
  débrouille
  débrouilleur
  débrouilleuse
- débrousser
  débroussaillement
  débroussailler
  débroussailleur
  débroussailleuse
- débucher "to break cover"
  débuché
- débusquer "to expel, drive out"
- débuter "to debut" ( dé- + but "goal, target" < OFr but, butte < Frk *but "end" < Gmc, cf ON bútr "end, goal, target")
  début
  débutant
  débutante
- débutaniser
- décaler "to bring forward"
  décalage
  décalé
- décalotter
- déchirer "to tear up"
  déchirant
  déchiré
  déchirée
  déchirant
  déchirement
  déchireur
  déchirure
- déclencher ( also déclancher)
  déclenchement ( also déclanchement)
  déclenche
  déclencheur
- déclic
- décliquer
  déclic
  décliqueter
- décocher
  décochage
  décochement
- décoiffer "to remove the headdress of"
  décoiffé
- décramponner
- décrier
  décri
  décrié
- décrocher "to unhook"
  décrochage
  décroché
  décrochement
  décrocheur
  décrochez-moi-çà
- décrotter "to clean, brush off"
  décrotteur
  décrotteuse
  décrottoir
- défalquer "to subtract, deduct"
  défalcation
- défarder
  défardé
- déforestation
- défraîchir
  défraîchi
- défrayer "to defray"
  défraiement ( also défraîment, défrayement)
- défricher
  défrichage
  défriché
  défrichement
  défricheur
- défriper
- défriser
  défrisé
  défrisement
- défroncer
  défroncement
- défroquer "to unfrock"
  défroque
  défroqué
- dégager "to redeem a pledge"
  dégagé
  dégagement
- dégalonner
- déganter
  déganté
- dégarnir "to strip"
  dégarni
  dégarnissement
- dégât "damage"
  dégâter
- dégauchir
  dégauchi
  dégauchissage
  dégauchissement
  dégauchisseuse
- dégazer
  dégazage
- dégingandé
  dégingandée
- dégivrer
  dégivrage
  dégivreur
- déglinguer
  déglingué
- dégrafer "to unhook"
  dégrafé
- dégréer "to rig"
  dégréement
- dégriffer
- dégrimer
- dégringoler
  dégringolade
  dégringolant
- dégriser "to sober up"
  dégrisé
  dégrisement
- dégrossir
  dégrossi
  dégrossissage
  dégrossissement
- dégrouper
  dégroupement
- déguerpir "to quit"
  déguerpissement
- déguignonner
- déguiser "to disguise"
  déguisé
  déguisement
- déhaler
- déhâler
- déhancher
  déhanché
  déhanchement
- déharnacher
  déharnachement
- déhonté "shameless"
- déjauger
- déjuc
- déjucher
- délabrer
  délabré
  délabrement
- délaisser
  délaissé
  délaissement
- délatter
- délayer
  délai "time" ( < OFr de- + laier "to leave" < Lat latare < Gmc, cf Goth lātan)
  délaiement
  délayage
  délayant
  délayé
  délayement
  délayure
- délester
  délestage
- déloger "to dislodge"
  délogement
- déloqueté
- déluré "disenchanted"
- démaquiller
  démaquillage
  démaquillant
- démarcation "demarcation"
- démarchage
- démarche "gait"
- démarcheur
- démarcheuse
- démarquer "to unmark"
  démarquage
  démarqueur
- démarrer "to unmoor"
  démarrage
  démarreur
- démasquer
  démasqué
- démâter
  démâtage
  démâté
- demi-aune
- demi-bague
- demi-bande
- demi-bosse
- demi-botte
- demi-drap
- demi-feutre
- demi-gros
- demi-haut
- demi-hauteur
- demi-hauteur à
- demi-louis
- demi-penny
- demi-watt
- démuseler
  démuselé
- dénantir
- dépaqueter
  dépaquetage
- dépatouiller
- dépiquer
  dépiquage
- dépocher
- dépoter
  dépotage
  dépotement
  dépoteyer
  dépotoir
- dérader ( < Eng road)
  dérade
- déralinguer
- déranger "to displace, derange"
  dérangé
  dérangement
  dérangeur
  dérangeuse
- déraper
  dérapage
- dérober "to rob, steal"
- désarroi "disarray"
- dessaisir "to dispossess, relinquish"
  dessaissement
- détacher "to detach"
  détachement
- détaler "to clear, pack up"
- développer "to develop"
  développable
  développant
  développante
  développé
  développée
  développement
- digue "an embankment"
  endiguer
- dock "dock"
- dogue "dog"
- dollar "dollar"
- donjon
- douelle "archivolt" ( < MFr douvelle, cf Germ döbel "peg, plug, dowel", Dut douwen "to push in")
- douve "stave of casks" ( < MFr douvelle, cf Germ döbel "peg, plug, dowel", Dut douwen "to push in")
- drageon (Bot.) "sucker"
- drague "dredge" ( < Eng drag < ON draga < Gmc)
  draguer
  dragueur
- drainer "to drain" ( < Eng drain < OE drēahnian < Gmc)
  drainage
- drap "cloth" ( < OFr < LL drappum < Gmc)
  draper
  drapier
  draperie
- drapeau "ensign" ( < drapeau "stuff, rag" < drap < Gmc)
- drèche "malt"
- drille "rag; drill; soldier"
- drogue "drug"
  droguiste
  droguer
- drogue "drogue"
- drôle "droll; knave"
  drôlerie
  drôlesse
  drôlatique
- dune "dune, a down" ( < OFr < MDu dūna, dūne "dune, down" < Gmc, cf OE dūn "hill, down")
- duvet

== E ==
- ébaucher "to sketch"
  ébauche
  ébauchoir
- ébaudir "to frolic; make gay" ( < MFr baud "jolly" < *Frk bald "quick, bold" < Gmc, cf OE beald "bold")
- éblouir "to dazzle" ( < LL *exblaudire < Frk blaudi < Gmc, cf OHG blōdi "weak, feeble" (Germ blöde))
- éblouissement
- ébranler "to shake" ( < branler < Gmc)
  ébranlement
- ébrécher "to impair, make a breach in"
- ébrouer "to wash" ( < Gmc, cf Germ brühen)
- écaille "scale, shell"
  écailler
  écaillère
- écale "shell, hull"
  écaler
- écang (also écangue ) "scutching blade"
  écanguer
- écanguer "to scutch"
  écangueur
  écanguage
  écangueuse
- échafaud "scaffold"
- échafaudage
- échafauder
- échanson "cupbearer"
- écharpe "scarp"
- échasse "tressel"
  échassier
- échevin "alderman, judge"
  échevinage
  échevinal
- échine "spine"
- échoppe "engraver"
- échoppe "stall, shop"
- éclat "fragment"
- éclater "to fragment, splinter"
  éclatant
- éclisse "split wood"
- écope "bailer"
- écosser "to shell, husk"
- écot "treebranch"
- écot "share, scot"
- écoute "sheet"
- écran "screen"
- écraser "to crush"
  écrasement
- écrevisse "crayfish"
- écrou "scroll"
- écume "foam"
  écumer
  écumeux
  écumeur
  écumoire
- écurie "a stable"
- efflanquer "to render lean"
- effrayer "to frighten"
- effroi "fright"
- effroyable "frightful"
- égard "regard"
- égarer "to mislead"
  égarement
  égaré
- égayer "to enliven"
- égratigner "to scratch"
  égratignure
- éhonté "shameless"
- élaguer "to prune"
  élagage
- élan "elan"
- elfe
- émail "enamel"
  émailler
  émailleur
- embaucher "to seduce"
  embauchage
  embaucheur
- emblaver "to sow corn" ( < ML imbladare < Frk < Gmc, cf OE blǣd "produce, crop, yield")
  emblavure
- embosser (Naut.) "to bring alongside of"
- embraser "to set on fire" ( < MFr embraser < em- + braser "to set on fire" < ON < Gmc, cf Swed brasa "fire, pyre", Swed brasa "to roast", Dan brase)
  embrasement
  embrasure
- embrasure "embrasure"
- embrayer
- embringuer
- embrouiller "to confuse, embroil"
- embuscade "ambuscade"
- embusquée "ambuscade"
- embusquer "to ambush"
- emerillon "merlin"
- émoi "anxiety"
- émousser "to dull, make blunt"
- empan "span"
- empoter "to pot"
- encaquer "to pack in barrels"
- engageant "engaging"
- engagement "engagement"
- engager "to engage"
- engraver "to embed in the sand"
  engravement
- enhardir "to embolden"
- enjoliver "to adorn"
  enjolivement
  enjolivure
  enjoliveur
- enrichir "enrich"
- entacher "to infect"
- entasser "to heap up"
  entassement
- enticher "to spoil, defile"
- entonner "to tun"
- envelopper "to envelop"
  enveloppant
  enveloppe
  enveloppé
  enveloppement
  enveloppeur
- épar "beam" ( < Frk *sparro; OHG sparro)
- épargner "to spare"
  épargne
- épater "to de-foot"
- épeautre
- épeler "to spell"
  épellation
- éperlan "smelt"
- éperon "spur"
  éperonner
- épervier "sparrow-hawk"
- épier "to spy"
- épisser "to splice"
  épissoire
  épissure
- épois "branches of an antler"
- équiper "to equip"
  équipe
  équipage
  équipée
  équipement
- érafler "to graze"
  éraflure
- escale (Nav.) "putting in"
- escarcelle "purse"
- escarmouche "skirmish"
- escarpe "scarp"
  escarper
  escarpment
  contrescarpe
- escarpin "sock, slipper"
- escarpolette "a swing"
- escogriffe "bean-pole"
- escrimer "to fence"
  escrime
- escroc "swindler"
  escroquer
  escroqueur
  escroquerie
- espiègle "frolicsome"
  espièglerie
- espion "a spy"
  espionner
  espionnage
- -esque adjective suffix ( < It -esco < LL -iscus < Gmc, cf OE -isc)
- esquif "skiff"
- esquiver "to dodge, avoid"
- est "east"
- estacade "stockade"
- estafier "foot-soldier; to bully"
- estafilade "a gash, slash, cut"
- estaminet "bistro, cafe"
- estampe "stamp, print"
  étampe
  estampille "a stamp"
  estamper "to stamp, print"
  étamper
  estampiller
- estoc "a stick; sword"
- estocade "stockade"
- estompe "stump"
- estrapade "strappado"
- esturgeon "sturgeon"
- étai "a stay, support"
  étayer
- étal "stall"
  étaler
  détaler
- étaler "to present for sale"
  étalage
  étalagiste
- étalon "stallion"
- étalon "a standard measure"
- étape "staples"
- étau "vice"
- étayer "to shore up"
  étayement
- étendard "standard, flag"
- éteuf
- étiquette "label"
  étiqueter
- étoffe "stuff"
  étoffer
- étrave
- étrier "stirrup"
- étrique "scanty"
- étrivière "leather strap"
- étron
- étui "case"
- étuve "stove"
  étuver
  étuvée
  étuviste

== F ==
- faille ″fabric, veil″ ( < Dut falie)
- falaise "cliff"
- falbala "furbelow" ( < Prov farbella "fringe" < Ital faldella "pleat" < falda "flap, fold" < Gmc, cf OHG faltan "to fold")
- fange
- fanon "flag"
- faquin "puppy, rascal"
  faquinerie
- farandole "farandole"
- fard "paint"
  farder
- faubourg "suburb"
- faucon "falcon"
  fauconneau
  fauconnerie
  fauconnier
- fauteuil "arm-chair"
- fauve "tawny, fallow"
  fauvette
- félon "felon" ( < OFr felun, obl. case of fel "traitor, wretch" < Frk *fillo, cf OS fillian "to whip, punish", OHG fillen "to whip, beat")
  félonie
- fer-blanc "tin plate"
  ferblantier
- ferme "farm" ( < OFr, < ML ferma, firma < OE feorm < Gmc)
  fermage
  fermette
  fermier
  fermière
- feudataire "feudatory"
- feudiste "feudist"
- feurre "straw"
- feutre "felt"
  feutrer
  feutrage
- fi (interject.) "fie" ( < OFr fi < ON fy < Gmc)
- fief "fief"
  fieffé
- fifre "fife"
- filtre "filter"
  filtrer
  filtration
  infiltre
- firme "company, business firm" ( < ML firma < OE feorm < Gmc)
- flacon "flagon, bottle"
- flagorner ″to fawn on″
- flammant "flamingo" ( < ML Flamingus "fleming" < Gmc *Flam-, cf OE Flæming, a native of Flanders)
- flanc "flank, side" ( < OFr < Frk *hlanca < Gmc, cf OHG hlanca "loin")
  flanquer
  efflanqué
- flandrin "lad"
- flanelle "flannel"
- flâner "to stroll" ( < Norm flanner < ON flana "to wander, go about" < Gmc)
  flâneur
- flaque "pool, puddle"
- flatter "to flatter"
  flatterie
  flatteur
- flèche "arrow"
- flèche "a flitch of bacon"
- fleuve "river" ( < OFr. Assumed to be a borrowing from < Lat fluvius, however, the form and meaning suggest a derivation from an earlier *floue, flouwe linking it to Frk *flōda "river, waterway to the sea, tidal flow" < Gmc *flōda, flōþuz "river, watercourse, ocean", cf OHG flōda, flōdu "river", ON flōð "river, waterway", Goth flōdus "river", OHG flouwan "to flow with water". Latin fluvius would have yielded *fluge in French (cf Lat leviarius > légère; Lat nivea, nivia > neige, etc.))
- flint-glass "flintglass"
- frichti 'snack, light meal' (< Alsacian fristick, standard German Frühstück)
- flocon "flake" ( < Frk *flako < Gmc *flak-, cf MDu vlak "flat, level", Germ Flocke "flake", ON flak)
  floconneux
- flot "wave" ( < Frk *flot- < Gmc *fluto-, cf ON flota, OE flotian, MDu vloten "to float")
  flotter
  flottage
  flottaison
- flotter "to float"
  flotte
  flottille
  flotteur
- flou "gentleness of touch"
  fluet
- fluet "thin, lanky"
- foc "jib-sail"
- folklore
  folklo
  folklorique
  folkloriste
- forban "pirate" ( < forbannir < Frk *firbannjan < for- "for-" + bannjan "to ban" < Gmc, cf Dut verbannen)
- forcené "lunatic, madman" ( < forsené < for + OFr sen "sense, judgement, reason" < Frk *sin < Gmc, cf OHG sin)
- forêt "forest" ( < Frk *forhist, forhista < Gmc, cf OHG forhist, foreht, forst "forest", OE fyrhþ "forest, game reserve")
  foresterie
  forestier
  forestièrement
- foudre "a tun (for liquids)" ( < Germ fuder < Gmc)
- foule "crowd" ( < OFr folc, fouc, fulc, foulc "people, crowd, multitude" < Frk *folc < Gmc, cf OE folc "folk". Influenced in form by unrelated verb fouler "to squeeze")
- fourbe "cheating"
- fourbir "to furbish" ( < OFr < Frk *furbjan < Gmc, cf OHG furban "to polish")
  fourbissage
  fourbissure
  fourbisseur
- fournir "to furnish"
  fourniment
  fournisseur
  fourniture
- fourrage "forage"
  fourrager
  fourragère
  fourrageur
- fourreau "case, frock"
- fourrer "to stuff, poke"
- fourrier "royal officer in charge of food"
- fourrure "fur"
- frac "frock"
- frais "fresh"
  fraîcheur
  fraîchir
  rafraîchir
- frais "expense, cost"
  défrayer
- fraise "ruffle, curl" ( < fraiser "to frizzle, curl" < Prov frezar "to curl" < Gmc, cf OE frīs "curled", OFris frēsle "lock of hair")
  fraiser
- framboise "raspberry"
  framboisier
  framboiser
- franc "a franc"
- franc "free"
  franchir
  franchise
  affranchir
- français "a Frenchman"
  franciser
  francisation
- franchir "to leap over"
- franchise "franchise, permission, freedom"
- francique "Frankish"
- frapper "to hit, strike"
  frappe
  frappement
  frappeur
- frayeur "fright"
- fredaine "frolic" ( < Prov fradin < Goth fraaiþeis < fra- "for-" + aiþeis, cf OHG freidic)
- fredonner "to hum"
  fredonnement
- frelater "to adulterate" ( < Flem verlaten < Gmc)
  frelateur
  frelatage
- frelon "hornet" ( < OFr frelun < Frk *hurslo, hruslo < Gmc, cf Dut horsel "hornet")
- fresque "fresco"
- fressure "plucking"
- fret "freight"
  fréter
  fréteur
  affréter
- freux "rook"
- friche "wasteland" ( < Frk *frisch < Gmc, cf Dut versch, virsch "fresh [expose of land]")
  défricher
- frimas "hoarfrost"
  frimaire
- fringale "hunger pang" ( < Norm frainvale < Gmc)
- fringant "brisk, dapper" ( < fringuer "to get dressed, clean up" < Frk *hreinjan "to clean, tidy up" < Gmc, cf OHG hreinjan "to purify, clean up")
  fringuer
- fripe "rag"
  fripier
  friperie
- friper "to rumple"
  fripe ( also frippe)
  fripon
- frise "[cheval de frise], a military term"
- friser "to frizz"
  frisure
  frison
  frisotter
  défriser
- froc "frock"
  frocard
  défroque
  défroquer
- fronce
  froncer "frown" (< Frk *hrunkja "wrinkle", cf Dut fronse, ronse "wrinkle", Ger Runzel "wrinkle")
- froncer
  défroncer
  froncement

== G ==
- gabelle "gabel"
  gabeleur
  gabelou
  gabeler
  gabelage
- gaber "to mock"
- gâche "staple"
  gâchette
- gâcher "to bungle"
  gâche
  gâcheur
  gâcheux
  gâchis
- gâchette "tumbler"
- gaffe "boat-hook" ( < OFr < Prov gaf < Goth *gafa "hook" < Gmc *gafa, cf OE gaf)
  gaffer
- gage "pledge"
  gagiste
- gager "to wager, hire"
  gage
  gagerie
  gageur
  gageure
  engager
  dégager
- gagnage "pasture"
- gagner "to earn"
  gain
- gai "gay, blissful, blithe"
  gaieté
  égayer
- gaieté "gaiety"
- gaillard "strapping man, guy (gars)+hard"
  gaillarde
  gaillardise
  ragaillardir
- gain "earnings, profits"
- gala "gala"
- galant "gallant"
  galanterie
  galantin
  galantiser
- galbe "entour"
- Gallois "Welsh"
- galonner "to lace"
  galon
- galoper "to gallop"
  galop
  galopin
  galopade
- galoubet "flute" ( < galouber < *galauber "to play an instrument, play well" < Prov galaubeiar "to act well" < Goth galaubei "great value" < Gmc, cf Goth galaufs "invaluable")
- galvauder "to throw into disorder"
- gamin "street urchin"
  gaminer
  gaminerie
- gangue "gangue"
- gant "glove"
  gantier
  ganter
  ganterie
  ganteler
- garance "madder" ( < Frk *wratja "madder" < Gmc, cf OHG rezza)
- garancer
- garant "guarantee, voucher"
  garantir
  garantie
- garçon "boy, waiter" ( < OFr garçun "servant", oblique case of gars "boy, soldier" < Frk *warkiōn, wrakjōn, oblique case of warkiō, wrakjō < Gmc *wrakja, wrakjan-, cf OHG wrecheo "an exile", OE wrecca "stranger, exile", ON rekkr "man")
- garder "to guard, keep, take care of" ( < OFr garder, guarder < Frk *wardōn < Gmc *wardo-, cf OHG wartēn "to watch over", OE weardian "to ward, guard")
  gardeur
- gardien "guardian" ( < OFr gardien, guarden < Frk *warding- < Gmc *wardo-)
- gardon "roach" (fish)
- gare "river basin"
- garenne "warren"
  garennier
- garer "to dock"
  gare
  égarer
- garnement "worthless fellow"
- garnir "to garnish"
  garniture
  garnement
  garnison
  garnisaire
  garni
- garnison "garrison"
- garniture "garnishing, furniture"
- garou(loup) "werewolf"
- garrot "club, big stick" ( < OFr guaroc < garokier "to obstruct" < Frk *wrokkōn "to twist, contort" & *wrok "knotty part of a tree" < Gmc, cf Dut wroegen "to torture, torment")
  garrotter
- gars "boy, guy" ( < OFr gars "boy, soldier" < Frk *warkiō, wrakjō < Gmc *wrakjan-, cf OHG wrecheo "an exile", OE wrecca "stranger, exile", ON rekkr "man")
- gaspiller "to waste, throw into confusion, squander"
  gaspilleur
  gaspillage
- gâteau "cake"
- gâter "to ruin, spoil" ( < OFr gaster, guaster < Frk *wōstjan (infl by Lat 'vastare') < Gmc, cf OHG wuostan "to waste", OE wēstan "to waste")
  dégât
- gâtine "wasteland, moor"
- gauche "left; left hand"
  gaucher
  gaucherie
  gauchir
- gauchir "to warp"
  gauchissement
- gaude "mignonette"
- gaufre "wafer, waffle"
  gaufrer
  gaufrier
  gaufrure
- gaule "long pole" ( < MFr gaulle < OFr gaule < Frk *walu < Gmc, cf ON volr, Goth walus, OE walu)
  gauler
- Gaule "Gaul" ( < Frk *walha "outlanders, Romans, Celts" < Gmc *walhos, cf OE wealh "Welsh")
  Gaulois
- gaupe "slattern"
- gaz "gas"
- gazon "turf"
  gazonner
  gazonnement
- gerbe "sheaf"
  gerbée
  gerber
- gerfaut "gerfalcon"
- gibelet "gimlet" ( < Ofr guimbelet < Frk < Gmc, cf MDu wimmelkijn)
- gibet "gibbet" ( < OFr gibe "staff, club" < Frk *gibb "forked stick" < Gmc, cf Eng gib)
- gibier (hunting) "game" ( < Frk *gabaiti < Gmc, cf OHG gebeize)
- giboyer "to hunt"
  giboyeur
  giboyeux
- gigot "leg of mutton"
- gigue "leg"
- gigue "jig"
- giron "lap"
- givre "frost"
- glapir "to yelp"
  glapissement
- glette "litharge"
- glisser "to slip"
  glissoire
  glissade
  glisseur
  glissement
- glouteron (Bot.) "burdock"
- goal "goal"
- godailler "to tipple"
  godaille
- godet "drinking cup"
- godron "godroon"
  godronner
- goguenard "banter"
  goguenarder
  goguenarderie
- goguette "merry creature"
- gonfalon "gonfalon"
  gonfalonnier
- gothique "Gothic"
- gourgandine "street-walker" ( < Dial Fr gore, goure "quean" + gandire < Goth wandjan "to go, walk"
- gourmade "punch, blow"
- gourmand "gourmand"
  gourmandise
- gourmander "to scold"
- gourmandise "gluttony"
- gourme "mumps" ( < Frk *wurm, worm < Gmc, cf OHG wurm)
- gourmé "curbed"
- gourmer "to beat"
  gourmette
  gourmade
- gourmet "gourmet"
- gourmette "curb-chain"
- grappe "bunch, hook"
  grappiller
  grappilleur
  grappillon
  grappin
  égrapper
- grappiller "to glean"
- grappillon "cluster of grapes"
- grappin "grapnel"
- grateron (Bot.) "scratchweed"
- gratin "burnt part of food"
- gratter "to scratch"
  grattelle
  grateron
  grattoir
  gratin
  égratigner
  égratignure
- graver "to engrave"
  graveur
  gravure
- gravure "engraving"
- gredin "scoundrel"
  gredinerie
- gréement "rigging"
- gréer "to rig"
  agrès
  gréement
  gréeur
- grêle "hail" ( < OFr gresler < Frk *grisilōn "to hail" < Gmc)
  grêlon
  grêler
- grelin "wallfish"
- grêlon "hailstorm"
- grelot "a bell"
- grelotter "to shiver"
- grès "sandstone"
  grésil
  gresserie
- grésil "sleet"
  grésiller
  grésillement
- griblette "hash of meat"
- gribouiller "to scrawl, daub"
  gribouillage
  gribouillette
- griffe "claw"
  griffer
  griffade
  griffonner
  griffonneur
  griffonnage
- grigner "to pucker"
  grignoter
- grignoter "to nibble"
- grimace "grimace"
  grimacer
  grimacier
- grimaud "urchin"
- grime (Theat.) "dotard"
  grimer
  grimaud
- grimper "to climb"
- grincer "to gnash"
  grincement
- gripper "to seize, grip"
  grippe
- gris "grey"
  grisâtre
  grisaille
  griser
  grison
- grisonner "to turn grey"
- grommeler "to grumble"
- groom "groom"
- groseille "gooseberry"
  groseillier
- grouiller "to stir" ( < MFr grouller < MDu grollen < Gmc)
  grouillement
- group "bag of money"
- groupe "group, cluster" ( < It gruppo "group, knot" < Germ kruppa < Gmc *kruppaz, cf OE cropp "bunch")
  grouper
  groupement
- gruau "oatmeal"
- gruger "to crunch"
- gruyer (Feud.) "someone permitted to forest wood"
  gruerie
- gué "a ford" ( < Frk *wad < Gmc *wada-, cf OE wæd, OE wadan "to wade")
  guéer
  guéable
  guéage
- guéau
- guède "wood"
- guelte "pay, payment" ( < Germ Geld < Gmc)
- guenipe
- guenon
- guenuche
- guêpe "wasp" ( < MFr guespe < OFr wespe < Frk *waspa, wespa < Gmc, cf Dut wesp, Germ Wespe, OE wæsp)
  guêper
  guêpier
  guêpière
- guerdon "guerdon" ( < OFr gueredun < ML widerdonum "recompense" < Frk *widarlōn "reward" < Gmc)
  guerdonner
- guère "hardly" ( < Ofr guaires < Frk *waigaro "much" < Gmc, OHG weigiro "not very")
  naguère
- guérir "to heal"
  guérison
  guérissable
- guérite "sentry box"
- guerre "war" ( < OFr guerre < Frk *werra < Gmc *werso, cf OHG werra "strife, quarrel")
  guerrier
  guerroyer
  aguerrir
- guerroyer "to fight"
  guerroyant
  guerroyeur
- guet "watch, wait, guard"
- guet-apens
- guêtre "a gaiter"
- guetter "to watch, look out, lurk"
  guet
  guetteur
  aguets
- gueuse "cast-iron"
- gueux "beggar" ( < MDu guit "rascal" < Gmc)
- gui "mistletoe" ( < Frk *wihsila "mistletoe < Gmc)
- guichet "wicket"
  guichetier
- guide "a guide"
  guider
  guidon
- guider "to guide"
- guigne (Bot.) "cherry"
- guigner "to glance at"
  guignon
- guignon "bad luck"
- Guillaume "William"
- guilledou "place of ill repute"
- guilleret "lively"
- guimauve (Bot.) "mallow"
- guimbarde "old crock"
- guimpe "wimple"
- guinder "to hoist oneself, exert"
- guinguette "villa"
- guipure "guipure"
- guirlande "garland"
  enguirlander
- guise "manner, way"
  déguiser

== See also ==
- History of French
- Old Frankish
- Franks
- List of Spanish words of Germanic origin
- List of Portuguese words of Germanic origin
- List of Galician words of Germanic origin
- List of French words of Gaulish origin
