= Elladoone =

- Location within Gauteng Location within South Africa
- Coordinates: 26°14′21″S 28°5′24″E
- Country: South Africa
- Province: Gauteng
- Municipality: City of Johannesburg
- Established: 1955
- Time zone: UTC+2 (SAST)
- Postal code (street): 2197

Elladoone is a suburb of Johannesburg, South Africa. It is located in Region F of the City of Johannesburg Metropolitan Municipality.

== History ==
Prior to the discovery of gold on the Witwatersrand in 1886, the suburb lay on land on one of the original farms called Klipriviersberg. It is named after the developer Arny Hohne's wife, Ella Hohne and became a suburb in 1955.
