= Tron (Scotland) =

Weighing beam in medieval Scotland

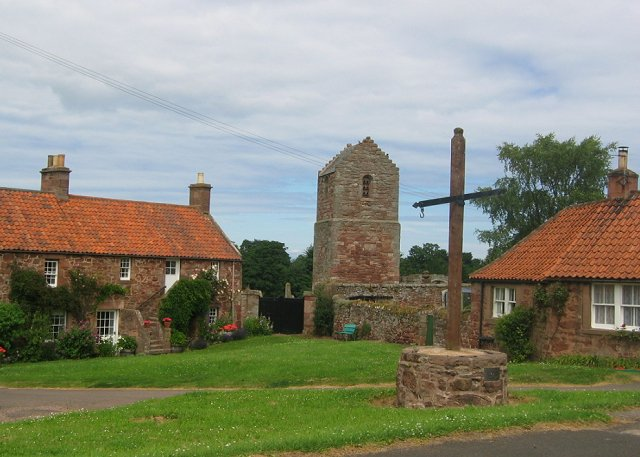
Reconstructed tron in the village of Stenton, East Lothian

A tron was a weighing beam in medieval Scotland, usually located in the marketplaces of burghs. There are various roads and buildings in several Scottish towns that are named after the tron. For example, Trongate in Glasgow and Tron Kirk in Edinburgh. Etymologically the word is derived from the Old French tronel or troneau, meaning "balance".

== Measurement of weight in medieval Scotland ==
From the 12th century the city fathers of Scottish burghs needed to standardise weights and measures, partly to collect the correct taxation on goods, and partly to stop unscrupulous merchants shortchanging citizens. Trons were set up in marketplaces throughout Scotland. Each burgh had its own set of weights, which sometimes differed from those of other burghs. Some burghs had more than one tron; in Edinburgh a butter tron was located at the head of the West Bow, while a salt tron was located further down the Royal Mile.

== See also ==
- Scottish units
- Tolbooth
- Tron-men
