= Electro Beatbox =

2002 compilation album

Electro Beatbox is an early Electro/Old school hip hop compilation album released by Decadance Recordings in 2002.

== Track listing ==
- West Street Mob - "Break Dance - Electric Boogie" (5:08)
- The 45 King - "The 900 Number" (2:54)
- J.V.C. F.O.R.C.E. - "Strong Island" (5:49)
- Young MC - "Know How" (Instrumental) (4:34)
- Ultramagnetic MC's - "Travelling at the Speed of Thought" (1:50)
- Twin Hype - "For Those Who Like to Groove" (6:22)
- Grandmaster Flash & Melle Mel - "White Lines (Don't Do It)" (7:26)
- The Funkmaster - "All Funked Up" (3:52)
- Vinyl Media - "The Bomb" (3:50)
- Intrigue Featuring Jenny Bean - "Curiosity" (3:46)
- Funky Four Plus One More - "That's the Joint" (9:18)
- Grandmaster Flash - "The Adventures of Grandmaster Flash on the Wheels of Steel" (7:00)
- Whodini - "Magic's Wand" (5:33)
- Newcleus - "Jam on It" (8:33)
- Herbie Hancock - "Rockit" (5:20)
- Hashim - "Al-Naafiysh (The Soul)" (7:42)
- Sugarhill Gang - "Rapper's Delight" (Ben Liebrand DMC Remix) (7:01)
- Egyptian Lover - "Egypt Egypt" (5:24)
- Nick Stansby - "Year of the Tiger" (4:33)
- Code Red - "Natural Law" (3:57)
- T La Rock - "Breaking Bells" (3:23)
- Davy DMX - "One for the Treble" (6:27)
- Spoonie Gee - "The Godfather" (2:55)
- Crash Crew - "Breaking Bells (Take Me to the Mardi Gras)" (7:20)
- Cryme - "Question Why?" (3:40)
- MC Mowgli - "Addict" (4:04)
- Solo - "Main Train" (4:07)
- Tyrant - "Trigonometry" (3:39)
- MC Science - "Armageddon" (3:54)
- MC Scott - "Suzie" (4:22)
