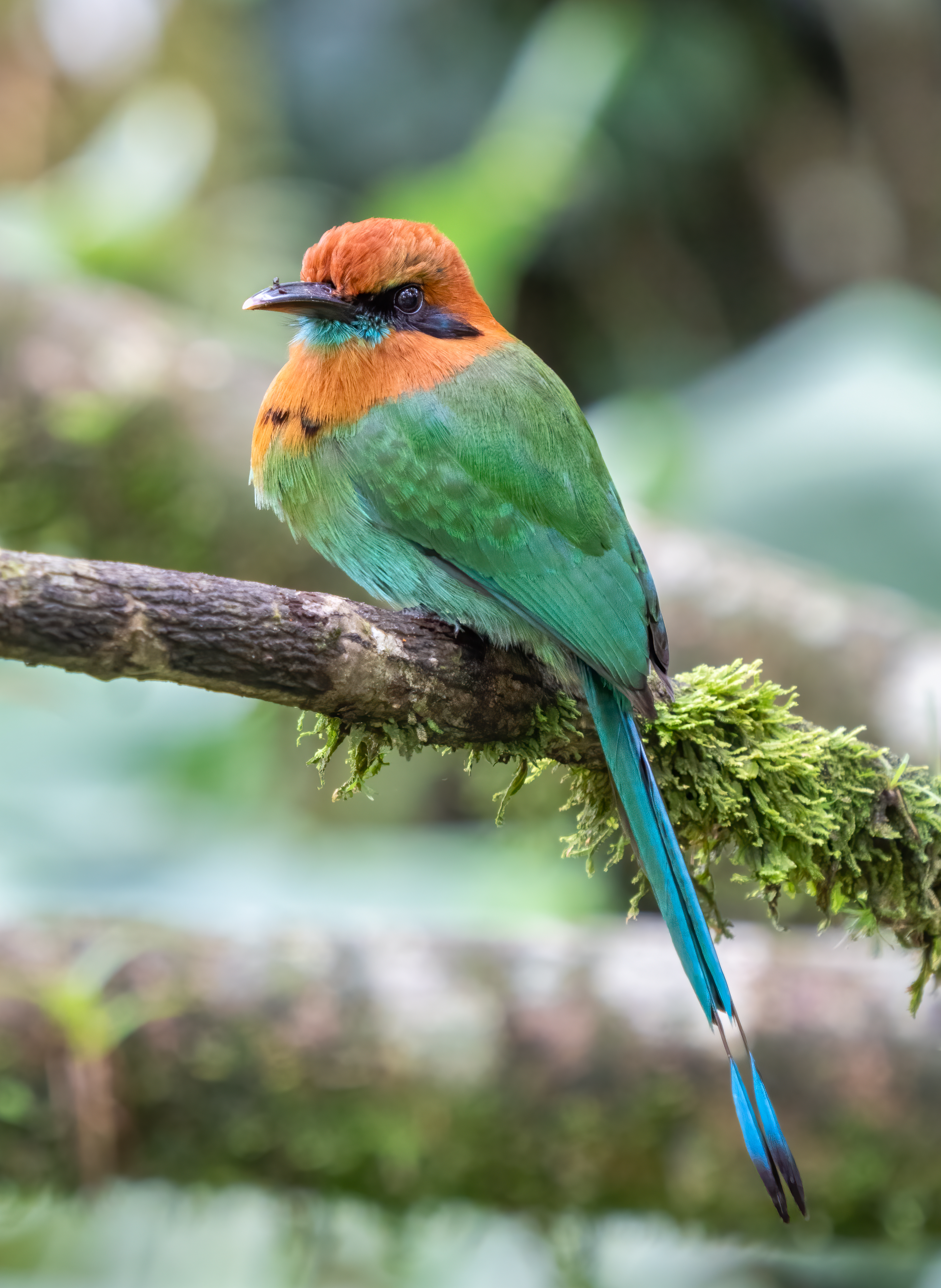
- Broad-billed motmot (Electron platyrhynchum)

Scientific classification
- Kingdom: Animalia
- Phylum: Chordata
- Class: Aves
- Order: Coraciiformes
- Family: Momotidae
- Genus: Electron; Gistel, 1848

Type species
- Momotus platyrhynchus Leadbeater, 1829

Species
- E. carinatum E. platyrhynchum

= Electron (bird) =

Genus of birds

Electron is a genus of the motmots, a family of Neotropical birds. The genus has two species:

| Image | Scientific name | Common name | Distribution |
|---|---|---|---|
| | Electron carinatum | Keel-billed motmot | Belize, Costa Rica, Guatemala, Honduras, Nicaragua, and Mexico |
| | Electron platyrhynchum | Broad-billed motmot | Bolivia, Brazil, Colombia, Costa Rica, Ecuador, Honduras, Nicaragua, Panama, and Peru. |

Both inhabit humid evergreen tropical forest. Both occur in Central America, and the broad-billed motmot occurs in a large region of South America as well.

They are distinguished from other motmots by their much wider bills. The rackets on their tails are less dramatic than those of many other motmot species and may be absent. The species are very similar except in adult plumage (but the adult keel-billed resembles the juvenile broad-billed). A mixed pair apparently courting has been observed (Howell and Webb 1995).

The name Electron is a Latinization of the Ancient Greek word for amber, and can mean "bright" in scientific names (Jaeger 1978). The name was given 46 years before an elementary particle was named electron.
