= Electron, Gauteng =

Electron
- Location within Gauteng Location within South Africa
- Coordinates: 26°14′28″S 28°5′46″E
- Country: South Africa
- Province: Gauteng
- Municipality: City of Johannesburg
- Main Place: Johannesburg
- Established: 1949

Area
  - Total: 0.38 km^{2} (0.15 sq mi)

Population (2011)
  - Total: 38
  - Density: 100/km^{2} (260/sq mi)

Racial makeup (2011)
  - Black African: 100.0%

First languages (2011)
  - Zulu: 15.8%
  - Sotho: 7.9%
  - Southern Ndebele: 5.3%
  - Tsonga: 5.3%
  - Other: 65.8%
- Time zone: UTC+2 (SAST)
- Postal code (street): 2197

Electron is a suburb of Johannesburg, South Africa. It is located in Region F of the City of Johannesburg Metropolitan Municipality.

== History ==
Prior to the discovery of gold on the Witwatersrand in 1886, the suburb lay on land on one of the original farms called Elandsfontein. It became a suburb on 27 July 1949.
