= Saülo Mercader =

Spanish painter

- Born: 1944 (age 81–82); San Vicente del Raspeig, Spain
- Occupations: Sculptor, painter

Saülo Mercader is a Spanish painter, sculptor and essayist. He was born on September 13, 1944, in San Vicente del Raspeig (Alicante, Spain). He has lived in Paris since 1975.

He has created art in a variety of different mediums, such as ceramics, high-warp tapestries, engravings, drawings, terracotta and lithographies.

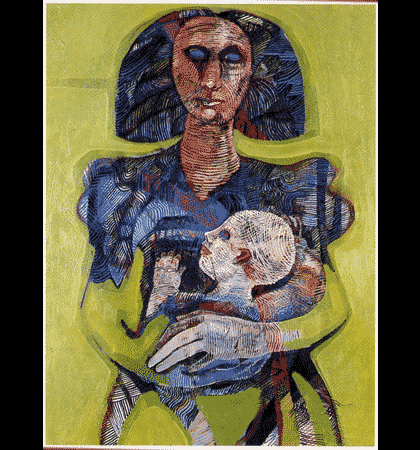
A mother holding her baby, from Saülo Mercader's Maternités painting series.

His works are not linked with current trends in visual arts, but are inspired by the events that take place in society and in his life.

== Biography ==
Saülo Mercader started modelling and drawing when he was six years old. He learnt the different techniques of modelling in the « Fallas » workshops in Alicante. He was an apprentice in the sculptor Serrano's workshops, which allowed him to learn the different steps in the making of bronze sculptures, from moulding to different processes of casting.

In 1964 he arrived in Bilbao (the Basque country where his professional career started. He made himself known through a series of collective and individual exhibitions. As a disciple of the sculptor Lucarini, he carved stone and worked on bronze, completing a series of remarkable busts as well as painted portraits, such as that of the Marquis de Lozoya in Segovia. One of his paintings : Peras en Primavera was acquired by the Fine Arts Museum in Madrid. Mercader received the Spanish Vocation Fund Prize 1972. He went to Rome through a scholarship given by the Castellblanch Catalan company. In Italy, he studied great masters, mainly Raphaël and Leonardo da Vinci, for whom he described feeling a connection.

Because of deadly floods in Bilbao that destroyed his studio, he lost a large part of his works, as well as personal effects like books, letters, and photos.

In 1974, he received a grant from the French government, which allowed him to stay in Paris and develop his art. He lived at the Cité internationale des arts for five years and met artists from around the world, like: painters, sculptors, comedians, musicians, ballet-dancers, writers. These encounters enlarged his vision of art. He participated in elite art shows in the capital : Salon de Mai, Salon d’Automne, Grands et Jeunes d’Aujourd’hui, Jeune Sculpture, Salon des Artistes Français, Contradiction, and Outre-Couleur. In the Cité Internationale des Arts’ workshops, he started weaving high-warp tapestries, guided by Jagoda Buic and Nora Music, and met weaver Marin Varbanov. Mercader followed S. W Hayter's courses in carving, as well as Matthey's courses in painting at the École nationale supérieure des Beaux-Arts in Paris.

Through his 1978 exhibition at the International Contemporary Art Fair (FIAC) in Paris, Mercader gained more recognition.

In 1981, he received an American Fulbright grant and went to New York City, where he worked for a couple of years. He lived on the Columbia University campus, and followed Professors Mahoney's and Maxwell's courses on lithography and Professor Schorr's courses on painting at Teachers' College, where he realized a series of ceramics with Panay Reyes. He isolated himself for a while to paint a few large paintings on the theme of American football whose exhibitions called the attention of some New York media. At the same time, he painted five extra-large paintings on the theme of "the tree," later exhibited at the Biennial of Alexandria.

He received a Master of Arts and Education degree at Teachers' College, Columbia University. Later, he met Andy Warhol, Roy Lichtenstein and Niki de Saint Phalle, which Saülo Mercader described in numerous illustrated notebooks and graphic works. By 1986 he had returned to Paris to earn a doctoral degree in visual arts Cum laude at Paris VIII University in 1986. He meets Tapies, Semprun and Camilo José Cela. He exhibited regularly in the capital and travelled mainly to Spain, where he became acquainted with Irish figurative painter Francis Bacon in Madrid.

Greece, particularly the mythology of Crete, inspired a large fresco (720 × 420 cm) entitled L’Attente du Minotaure, which belongs to the Tzovaridis's art collection in Athens. During trips to the Naxos island in the Cyclads, he drew a series of works inspired by the Cycladic art. In Turkey and Cyprus, Saülo Mercader interacted with Eastern cultures, architecture, and art. He exhibits a few paintings in the Istanbul Biennial; then in Bodrum, in Nicosia where the encounters with Turkish and Cypriot artists such as Aylin Örek, Habib Gerez, Feti Arda nourish and inspire his creations. In Germany, his palette of colours get brighter and his subjects get more daring; he manages to secure exhibits in Düsseldorf and Köln. In Brussels and Ostende, he paints misty landscapes. He also exhibits in Utrecht, and was inspired by its romantic canals.

The city of Figeac (in the Lot region, South of France) welcomes two exhibitions in 1995 and 2000 on the Minotaur theme : Les Hurlements du Taureau. In 2000, he paints one of his major works : la Bachannale des Minotaures. This very large painting is shown along with a series of minotaurs at the Palacio del Infantado in Guadalajara and in Alicante (Spain).

Saülo Mercader has always been interested in transmitting his knowledge. He was often invited to animate classes among young pupils. He participates in a program : L’Art à l’Ecole with exhibitions and conferences sponsored by The Ministry of Youth and Sports. Saülo Mercader often travels to his native country. His exhibition : El Euro y Los Minotauros (2002–2003) at the Lonja del Pescado in Alicante is sponsored by Alicante Townhall, the consortium of museums and the Generalitat of Valencia. He regularly exhibits in the French provinces. His exhibition : Les hologénies de l’Etron at the Cervantes Cultural Institute in Toulouse (South of France) surprises by the originality of its theme.

A few years later, he has the honour to represent the Spanish artists living in Paris during a reception given at the Spanish Embassy where he met former King of Spain Juan Carlos I.

In 2012, he was officially invited by the French Embassy in Astana (Kazakhstan) where he exhibited his paintings on the occasion of the French National Feast (July 14).

During his stay in Kazakhstan and Ouzbekistan, he visited places such as the Tangaly Petroglyphs, ancient monuments on the Silk Road, Mongol and Asian architecture, Edouard Kazarian's workshop in Almaty, and historic museums.

He often goes to Spain to do public works, stone or bronze busts, painted portraits and to exhibit. He participated at the Fallas in Alicante in 2007 by making a bull with diverse materials in the pure tradition of the Ninots.

== Distinctions ==
Saülo Mercader received the Prize of the Vocation Fund (Barcelone – Spain), and received a grant from the French government. In 1981, he was awarded the Fulbright Grant.

He is Commander in the Order of the Arts and Letters (French Ministry of Culture). He was awarded the Vermeil Medal of the City of Paris.

== Works ==
=== Paintings ===
There are different periods in his creations according to the places he has lived. The Catalan period inspired him tormented landscapes and subjects with symbolic elements : keys, candlesticks, twilights, the moon, portraits and self-portraits. In Paris he paints what he calls « the Green series » featuring unique characters and urban landscapes. Later on, the tauromachia scenes and a series of minotaurs include themes that denounce censure, injustices, solitude, wars. He painted a very large painting entitled : La Bacchanale des Minotaures, exhibited in Figeac, an exhibition sponsored by the Direction Régionale d’Art Contemporain (DRAC), by the Conseil Régional du Lot, and by the Spanish Embassy.

In New York, he is influenced by the American football, the American way of life, Native Americans and urban landscapes : towers, skyscrapers. The themes of the couple and mothers with child are recurrent.

He painted around 70 canvasses inspired by the Australian Aborigenes’ culture and traditions.

=== Sculptures ===
In 2007, he created a monument for the City of San Vicente del Raspeig (Alicante, Spain) titled Dona Lluna. The bronze sculpture is five-and-a-half metres high and stands in the middle of a rotunda. It is surrounded with 12 painted pieces of raw marble that represent a lunar calendar. It represents a heathen temple dedicated to "Womankind unique in Europe."

=== Tapestries ===
In the late 70s, Saülo Mercader weaves some high-warp tapestries called « sacred ». Among them, let us note : Anamnèse, la Fatijah and Rotor III, a large three-dimensional tapestry inspired by the volumes in sculpture and by Sheila Hicks’s textile creations. He mixes up diverse fabrics such as plastic tubes, corks, cloth that are woven and inserted into the cotton and woollen threads.

=== Main exhibitions and collections ===
Saülo Mercader's works were exhibited at the FIAC (International Contemporary Art Fair in Paris – 1978 as well as in all the main French Salons in the capital : Salon d’Automne / Salon de Mai / Salon de la Jeune Sculpture / Salon des Artistes Français / Figuration Critique/ Comparaisons/ Outre-Couleur/ École Française/ Festival d’Art Sacré de Tournus/ Bordeaux, Mérignac/ Clermond-Ferrand), Versailles.

His works are regularly exhibited in Spain (including the two remarkable ones in Guadalajara and Alicante (50)(51), in France; they represent France and Spain at international Biennials : Genève, Alexandria, Valparaiso, Istanbul Festival, in Kazakhstan and in more than a hundred one-man shows round the world.

Saülo Mercader's works are present in numerous private and public collections in the world : The Museum of Contemporary Art in Madrid (Peras en Primavera), the French National Library (engravings at Richelieu site « The poet »), Teachers’ College, Columbia University in New-York City (« The Eight Profiles »), a few works at the Bodrum Art and Archeology Museum (Turkey), State Turkish Museum (« Equilibrium of the Mind »), City of Tarragone and City of Guadalajara (Spain), Tzovaridis's collection in Athens (« L’Attente du Minotaure ») and more others.

== Publications ==
=== Books ===
- 1993: « Art, Matière, Énergie » aux éditions Imago-PUF- France

commentaire biblio|It is a book about the theory of Art and an analytical approach of the different components in the artistic creation.

- 2000: Les Chants de l'Ombre aux éditions Imago-PUF-France

China ink drawings by the author and prefaced by Yves Coppens. Mercader comments on his years as a child and young man in Spain under the Francoist regime.

- 2010: Extrate-Art, Vision de lo invisible. written in Castilian. He writes his belief in an osmosis between the Universe and Humankind and makes us travel in boundless worlds with invisible frontiers where the artist himself claims to become a shaman. The French version of this book is published later on, prefaced by the historian Bartolomé Bennassar. The book is printed in limited numbers with two different covers illustrated by the author.ISBN 978-84-614-0908-2
- His testimonies on the Franquist period in Spain have been published in French and Spanish books : » Traumas-ninos de la Guerra y del exilio and « Enfants de la Mémoire » (Edition of the Association Memoria Historica y democratica del Baix Llobregat, Spain).

=== Bibliographies ===
Numerous exhibition catalogues and monographies have been printed on Saülo Mercader's works.

- (Spanish) La Gran Enciclopedia Basca, 1975 (Painting and Sculpture chapters) (Painting and Sculpture chapters)
- (Spanish) Saülo Mercader, Madrid, Colección Arte Contemporáneo n° 65, Fernando Ponce, 1989
- (French, English, Spanish) Saülo Mercader, Moi le Roi, Madrid, Fernando Ponce, 1992 (ISBN 8440494491) including 280 colour reproductions
- (Spanish, Basque language) poems by Marrodan, El Viaje de las Musas, 1993. Boxes limited to 20 specimens with 10 engravings by Saülo Mercader.
- (French, English, Spanish) text by J. Rivais, Saülo Mercader, Guadalajara Townhall, 1999 (ISBN 8487874258) – 250 colour reproductions (paintings).
- (French, English, Spanish) El Euro y los Minotauros, Alicante Townhall and the Consortium of Museums – Generalitat Valenciana – Spain, 2002 (ISBN 8448233212). These monographies contain respectively 150 and 75 colour reproductions of his art.

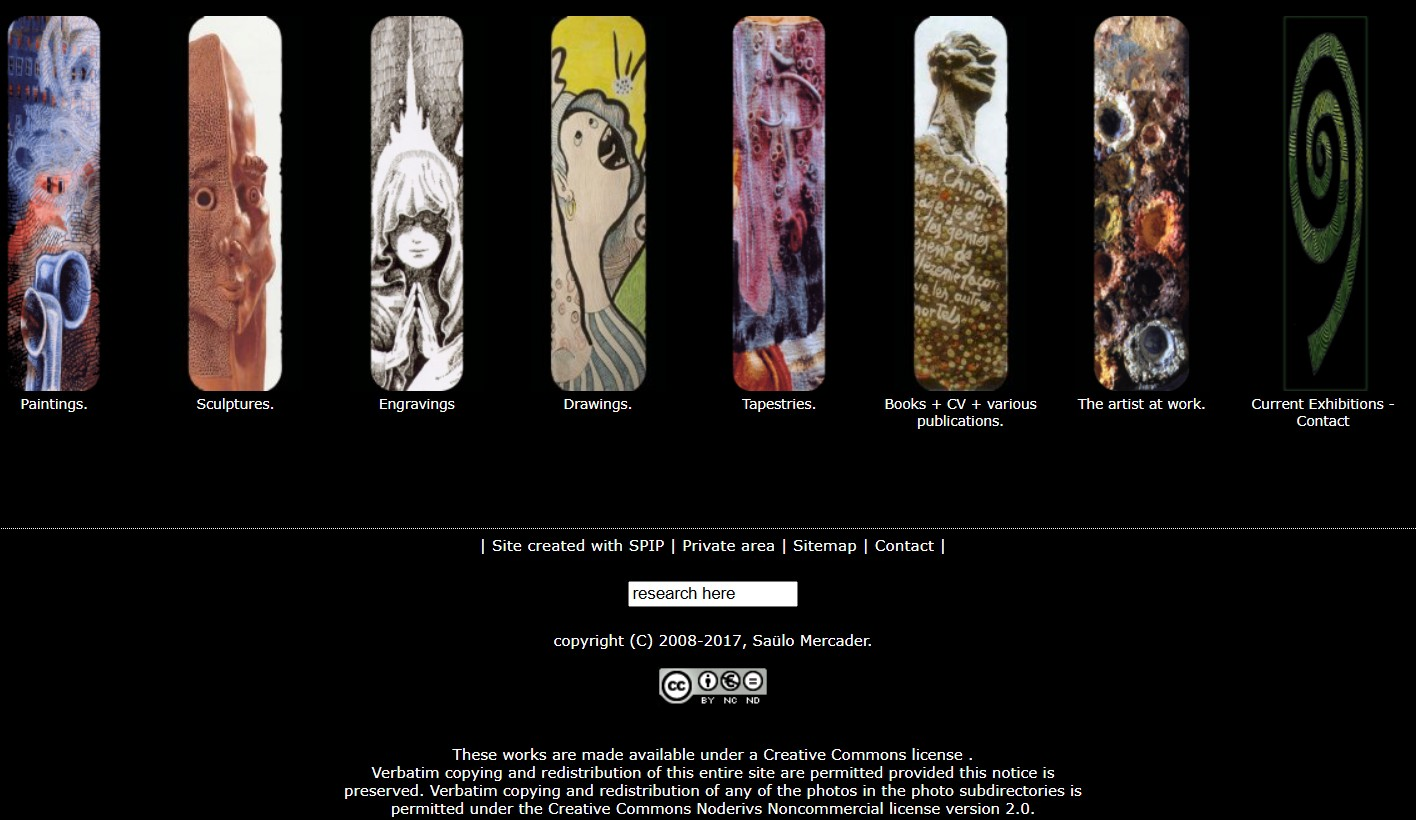
Screenshot of Mercader's official website, displaying his self-chosen categories for his art.

=== Website ===
Mercader's official website can be found at https://www.saulomercader.org/?lang=fr
