= List of English words of French origin =

The percentage of modern English words derived from each language group: Anglo-Norman French, then French: ~29% Latin, including words used only in scientific, medical or legal contexts: ~29% Germanic: ~26% Others: ~16%

The prevalence of words of French origin that have been borrowed into English is comparable to that of borrowings from Latin. Estimates vary, but the general belief is that 35%, 40%, or possibly as many as 45% of the English dictionary have words of French origin. This suggests that up to 80,000 words should appear in this list. The list, however, only includes words directly borrowed from French, so it includes both joy and joyous but does not include derivatives with English suffixes such as joyful, joyfulness, partisanship, and parenthood.

Estimates suggest that at least a third of English vocabulary is of French origin, with some specialists, like scholars, indicating that the proportion may be two-thirds in some registers. After the Norman Conquest led by William the Conqueror in 1066, the ruling elite introduced their Old French [Norman] lexicon into England, where it gradually blended with Old English, which the Germanic language had already shaped. Of the 15,000 words in William Shakespeare's works, 40% are of French origin.

Furthermore, the list excludes compound words in which only one of the elements is from French, e.g. ice cream, sunray, jellyfish, killjoy, lifeguard, and passageway, and English-made combinations of words of French origin, e.g. grapefruit (grape + fruit), layperson (lay + person), magpie, marketplace, petticoat, and straitjacket. Also excluded are words that come from French but were introduced into English via another language, e.g. commodore, domineer, filibuster, ketone, loggia, lotto, mariachi, monsignor, oboe, paella, panzer, picayune, ranch, vendue, and veneer.

English words of French origin should be distinguished from French words and expressions in English.

Although French is mostly derived from Latin, important other word sources are Gaulish and some Germanic languages, especially Old Frankish.

Latin accounts for about 60% of English vocabulary either directly or via a Romance language. As both English and French have borrowed many words from Latin, determining whether a given Latin word entered English via French or directly from Latin might in some cases be difficult.

== Historical context ==
Most of the French vocabulary now appearing in English was borrowed in the centuries following the Norman Conquest of 1066, when England came under the rule of Norman-speaking peoples. After William the Conqueror had invaded England, subsequent rulers invaded other parts of the British Isles, distributing lands and property to Norman, Breton, Flemish, and French soldiers. As a result, Old French became the language of high culture and government. With time, it evolved into Anglo-Norman French, a language widely used by the nobility and for legal affairs (See Law French).

The use of French and Norman in the kingdom was "extremely important" from William the Conqueror's coronation in 1066 until 1260.

Old English, which the vast majority of English people continued to speak, started to change due to the increasing number of borrowings from French, the language of the ruling elite. Over time this led to pairs of words, many of which belong in different language registers: artisan/craftsman, autumn/fall, beverage/drink, cemetery/graveyard, commence/start, commerce/trade, continue/carry on, cry/weep, dame/lady, depart/leave, disengage/withdraw, encounter/meet, exchange/swap, fatigue/tire, fume/smoke, garment/clothes, maintain/uphold, mansion/house, marry/wed, menace/threat, odor/smell, pain/ache, people/folk, plume/feather, present/gift, purchase/buy, revenue/income, rob/steal, serpent/snake, sorcerer/wizard, sorceress/witch, table/board, timid/shy, vend/sell, sir, sire/lord. Walter Scott popularized the idea of the Anglo-Norman nobility eating the meats of the animals that Anglo-Saxon peasants had raised: beef/cow, mutton/sheep, veal/calf and pork/pig. In each case the word of French origin was only used in the kitchen. In fact this occurred centuries after the Norman conquest (a modern example being escargot/snail) and might owe more to the enduring prestige of French cuisine than to a hypothetical specialization of tasks.

Words of French origin often refer to more abstract or generalized concepts than their Old English equivalents (e.g. liberty/freedom, justice/fairness, source/spring, vision/sight, sentiment/feeling); they are therefore less frequently used in everyday language. However, this is not true for all English words of French origin. Consider, for example, some of the most common words in English: able, car, chair, city, country, different, fact, fine, fruit, group, journey, juice, just, large, move, part, people, person, place, point, problem, public, push, real, remain, stay, table, travel, use, very, and wait.

After Henry Plantagenet ascended the throne of England, other French dialects gained influence at the expense of Anglo-Norman, notably the Angevin dialect from whence the House of Plantagenet came, and possibly Poitevin, the tongue of Eleanor of Aquitaine.

The motto of the British monarchy was proclaimed in French as "Dieu et mon droit". The aristocracy ruled England using French, which was considered "the language of an elite", until 1260. After 1260, English merchants and jurists began to speak French. Between 1260 and 1400, everyday and popular language adopted words borrowed from French.

With the English claim to the throne of France, the influence of courtly French of Paris increased. French cultural influence remained strong in the following centuries. From the Renaissance onwards, most borrowings were from Parisian French, which had become the de facto standard language of France.

Le Devoir's Jean-François Nadeau wrote, "Many English words were borrowed from Old French, but also from Norman". Nadeau noted, "More than a third of English vocabulary is indeed of French origin." Modern-day older Norman-speaking people in Normandy recognise English words as Norman.

Linguist Bernard Cerquiglini said, "All of the sustained vocabulary of English or almost, belongs to the French language", adding, "International English comes from French." Reflecting on the globalised dimension of English, he said that "English was able to dethrone French by first plundering French".

== Notable fields of French influence ==
=== Feudalism ===
Norman rule of England had a lasting impact on British society. Words from Anglo-Norman or Old French include terms related to chivalry (homage, liege, peasant, seigniorage, suzerain, vassal, villain) and other institutions (bailiff, chancellor, council, government, mayor, minister, parliament), the organisation of religion (abbey, clergy, cloister, diocese, friar, mass, parish, prayer, preach, priest, sacristy, vestment, vestry, vicar), the nobility (baron, count, dame, duke, marquis, prince, sir), and the art of war (armour, baldric, dungeon, hauberk, mail, portcullis, rampart, surcoat). Many of these words related to the feudal system or medieval warfare have a Germanic origin (mainly through Old Frankish) (see also French words of Germanic origin).

The Norman origin of the British monarchy is visible in expressions like Prince Regent, heir apparent, Princess Royal in which the adjective goes after the noun, as in French.

All British noble vocabulary such as "baron, count, monarch, monarchy, noble, prince, regent, royal, sire, sovereign, throne, vassal" is borrowed from French.

=== Heraldry ===
The vocabulary of heraldry has been heavily influenced by French (blazon, or, argent, sable, gules, passant), for more details see tinctures, attitudes, and charges of heraldry.

Sometimes used in heraldry, some mythological beasts (cockatrice, dragon, griffin, hippogriff, phoenix, wyvern) and exotic animals (lion, leopard, antelope, gazelle, giraffe, camel, zebu, elephant, baboon, macaque, mouflon, dolphin, ocelot, ostrich, toucan, chameleon) draw their name from French. This is also true for some animals native to Europe (via Anglo-Norman: buzzard, coney, cormorant, eagle, egret, falcon, ferret, heron, leveret, lizard, marten, plover, rabbit, salmon, squirrel, viper).

=== Military ===
The vocabulary of warfare and the military includes many words and expressions of French origin (accoutrements, aide-de-camp, army, artillery, battalion, bivouac, boyau, brigade, camouflage, carabineer, cavalry, cordon sanitaire, corps, corvette, dragoon, espionage, esprit de corps, état major, fusilier, grenadier, guard, hors-de-combat, infantry, latrine, legionnaire, logistics, matériel, marine, morale, musketeer, officer, pistol, platoon, reconnaissance/reconnoitre, regiment, rendezvous, siege, soldier, sortie, squad, squadron, surrender, surveillance, terrain, troop, volley). This includes military ranks: admiral, captain, colonel, corporal, general, lieutenant, sergeant. Many fencing terms are also from French.

=== Politics and economics ===
The political/economic lexicon includes many words of French origin such as money, treasury, exchequer, commerce, finance, tax, liberalism, capitalism, materialism, nationalism, plebiscite, coup d'état, regime, sovereignty, state, administration, federal, bureaucracy, constitution, jurisdiction, district.

Several terms for trades and professions are from Anglo-Norman French: barber, butcher, carpenter, draper, grocer, mariner, mason, mercer, merchant, scrivener, surgeon and tailor.

=== Law ===
The judicial lexicon has been heavily influenced by French (justice, judge, jury, attorney, court, case) and terms related to law enforcement (arraign, arrest, detention, constable, marshal, officer, police, prison, jail).

=== Diplomacy ===
attaché, chargé d'affaires, envoy, embassy, chancery, diplomacy, démarche, communiqué, aide-mémoire, détente, entente, rapprochement, accord, treaty, alliance, passport, protocol.

=== Arts ===
art, music, dance, theatre, author, stage, paint, canvas, perform, harmony, melody, rhythm, trumpet, note, director, gallery, portrait, brush, pallet, montage, surrealism, impressionism, fauvism, cubism, symbolism, art nouveau, gouache, aquarelle, collage, render, frieze, grisaille.

=== Architecture ===
aisle, arcade, arch, vault, voussoir, belfry, arc-boutant, buttress, bay, lintel, estrade, facade, balustrade, terrace, lunette, niche, pavilion, pilaster, porte cochère.

=== Aviation and automobiles ===
France played a pioneering role in the fields of aviation (nacelle, empennage, fuselage, fenestron, aileron, altimeter, canard, decalage, monocoque, turbine) and automobile engineering or design (chassis, piston, arbor, grille, tonneau, berline, sedan, limousine, cabriolet, coupé, convertible).

=== Cuisine ===
baba au rhum, beef, beef bourguignon, boudin, caramel, casserole, cassoulet, chowder, clafoutis, confit, consommé, cream, croissant, custard, filet mignon, fillet, foie gras, flognarde, fondant, fondue, gateau, gratin, madeleine, marmalade, mayonnaise, meringue, mille-feuille, mustard, mutton, navarin, pâté, pastry, petit four, pork, porridge, potage, pudding, puree, ragout, ratatouille, roux, salad, sauce, sausage, soufflé, soup, stew, terrine, trifle, veal, venison, vol-au-vent.

=== Colours, the natural world and measurements ===
Other borrowings include the names of colours (beige, blue, carmine, cerise, ecru, gridelin, lilac, maroon, mauve, orange, perse, russet, scarlet, turquoise, vermilion and violet), the natural world (animal, insect, mineral, plant, herb, flower, fruit, vegetable, mushroom), vegetables and fruits (apricot, aubergine, cabbage, carrot, cherry, chestnut, citron, clementine, courgette, cucumber, currant, grape, haricot, lemon, lentil, mandarin, melon, onion, orange, parsley, peach, pumpkin, quince, spinach), measurements (metre, hectare, litre, gram, ounce, hour, minute, second, decade, dozen, million), and months of the year (January, March, May, July, November, December).

=== Terms coined by French people ===
Some of the French words that made their way into the English language were coined by French-speaking inventors, pioneers or scientists: cinema, television, helicopter, parachute, harmonium, bathyscaphe, lactose, lecithin, bacteriophage, chlorophyll, mastodon, pterodactyl, oxide, oxygen, hydrogen, carbon, photography, stethoscope, thermometer, stratosphere, troposphere.

=== Named after French people ===
Some English words come from the French surnames of famous people, especially in the fields of science (ampere, appertisation, baud, becquerel, braille, coulomb, curie, daguerreotype, pascal, pasteurise, vernier), botany and mineralogy (begonia, bougainvillea, clementine, magnolia, dolomite, nicotine), fashion and other cultural aspects (chauvinism, guillotine, kir, lavalier, leotard, mansard, praline, recamier, saxophone, silhouette, strass).

=== Proper names ===
The names of some cities in non-francophone areas came into English with French spelling (Louisville, Constance, Ypres, Bruges, Louvain, Turin, Milan, Plaisance, Florence, Rome, Naples, Syracuse, Vienna, Prague, Munich, Cologne, Aix-la-Chapelle, Seville, Constantinople).

In North America, the names of some of the Native American peoples and First Nations who the French were in contact with first are from French (Sioux, Saulteaux, Iroquois, Nez Perce, Huron, Cheyenne, Algonquin). Many place names also came into English via French, such as Canada, Arkansas, Illinois, Maine, Michigan, Vermont, Baton Rouge, Boise, Chicago, Des Moines, Detroit.

== Main patterns of influence ==
Old French had a "gw" sound, which mainly occurred in borrowings from old Germanic languages such as Frankish and Burgundian. In Parisian and other Langue d'oïl dialects, the "w" was elided, leaving "g". Conversely, in northern dialects such as Picard and Norman, the "g" was elided, leaving "w". Compare for instance the northern Old French "werre" (hence English "war") and central Old French "guerre", both from the same Frankish word. The northern French dialects (north of the Joret line) also retained the "c" (pronounced like "k") where in other Langue d’oïl dialects it would become "ch" (pronounced like "tsh", and later "sh"). Compare for instance "cat" and "chat", both from Latin "cattus". And where the northern dialects would have "ch", it was "c" (pronounced like "s") in the other dialects of French. Compare for instance "cherise" (hence English "cherry") and "cerise".

After the Norman Conquest, it was the Norman variety of French that took root in England. However, in several cases, the central French version has subsequently been borrowed as well, leading to doublets such as catch and chase, warden and guardian, warranty and guarantee.

Some Old French words have been reborrowed during the Middle French or Modern French periods, generally with a more restrictive or specialised meaning. Consider for instance these doublets : alley/allée, chair/chaise, chief/chef, cream/crème, dungeon/donjon, feast/fete, luminary/luminaire, liquor/liqueur, lodge/loge, castle/château, hostel/hotel, mask/masque, necessary/nécessaire, periwig/peruke, petty/petit, saloon/salon, ticket/etiquette, troop/troupe, vanguard/avant-garde. Note that the word in French has retained the general meaning: e.g. château in French means "castle" and chef means "chief". In fact, loanwords from French generally have a more restricted or specialised meaning than in the original language, e.g. legume (in Fr. légume means "vegetable"), gateau (in Fr. gâteau means "cake"). Note that this is also generally the case with French words borrowed from English (in Fr. cake refers to the English-style fruitcake). Borrowings contributed to expand the list of false friends between English and French.

In some cases, English has been more conservative than French with Old French words, at least in the spelling: e.g. apostle (O.Fr. apostle / M.Fr. apôtre), castle (O.Fr. castel or chastel / M.Fr. château), forest (O.Fr. forest / M.Fr. forêt), vessel (O.Fr. vaissel / M.Fr. vaisseau). Other Old French words have even disappeared from Modern French, e.g. dandelion.

On the other hand, a move to restore classical word roots (Latin or Ancient Greek), occurred in the 16th and 17th centuries; many words from Old French had their spelling re-Latinized. While this did not generally affect their pronunciation (e.g. debt, doubt, indict/indictment, mayor), in some cases it did (e.g. abnormal, adventure, benefit, perfect). In words of Greek origin, f was replaced by the older ph digraph. Hence fantosme became phantom, fesan became pheasant. This also occurred in French, though less systematically: Old French farmacie became pharmacie ("pharmacy"), fenix became phénix ("phoenix"), but fantosme became fantôme ("phantom, ghost") and fesan became faisan ("pheasant").

Beside re-Latinization that blurred the French origin of some words (e.g. foliage, peradventure), other spelling changes have included alterations due to folk etymology (e.g. andiron, belfry, crayfish, cutlet, delight, female, furbelow, gillyflower, gingerbread, gridiron, penthouse, pickaxe, pulley).

The spelling of some words was changed to keep the pronunciation as close to the original as possible (e.g. leaven). In other cases, the French spelling was kept, leading to a totally different pronunciation than in French (e.g. leopard, levee). More recent borrowings from French have kept their original spelling and a more or less close approximation their original pronunciation: (e.g. ambiance, aplomb, arbitrage, armoire, atelier, barrage, bizarre, bonhomie, bourgeoisie, brochure, bureau, café, camaraderie, cartilage, catalogue, chandelier, chauffeur, coiffure, collage, console, contour, cortège, couturier, crèche, critique, debris, décor, dénouement, depot, detour, dossier, echelon, élite, ennui, entourage, entrepreneur, envelope, espionage, expertise, exposé, fatigue, financier, garage, genre, glacier, impasse, intrigue, liaison, lingerie, macabre, machine, marquise, massage, matinée, menagerie, métier, millionaire, mirage, montage, nuance, panache, parti pris, penchant, personnel, plaque, prestige, programme, promenade, provenance, raconteur, rapport, rapporteur, repertoire, reservoir, ricochet, riposte, routine, sabotage, sachet, sardine, souvenir, tableau, terrain, tourniquet, trait, tranche and vignette). However, this may change with time, e.g. the initial h in hotel is not silent anymore, consider also the variant pronunciations of herb and garage. Meanwhile, expressions such as femme fatale, faux pas, haute couture, bête noire and enfant terrible are still recognisably French.

Borrowing is not a one-way process (See Reborrowing). Some words of French origin ultimately come from Old English (Anglo-Saxon words): e.g. bateau, chiffon, gourmet, or Middle English: e.g. lingot. Conversely, some English words of French origin have made their way "back" into Modern French: badge, budget, cash, catch, challenge, design, discount, establishment, express, fuel, gay, gin, humour, interview, jury, magazine, management, mess, nurse, pedigree, pellet, performance, punch, rave, record, reporter, scout, spleen, sport, squat, standard, suspense, tennis, ticket, toast, toboggan, tunnel, vintage and volley.

== See also ==
- Influence of French on English
- Glossary of French words and expressions in English
- Law French
- Glossary of fencing (predominantly from French)
- Glossary of ballet (predominantly from French)
- Lists of English loanwords by country or language of origin
- List of English words of Gaulish origin
- List of English words of Latin origin
- List of English Latinates of Germanic origin
- Latin influence in English
- List of French words of Germanic origin
- List of French words of Gaulish origin
- List of French words of Arabic origin
- List of French words of English origin
- List of German words of French origin
