= Changes to Old English vocabulary =

Changes from Old to Modern English

Many words that existed in Old English did not survive into Modern English. There are also many words in Modern English that bear little or no resemblance in meaning to their Old English etymons. Some linguists estimate that as much as 80 percent of the lexicon of Old English was lost by the end of the Middle English period, including many compound words, e.g. bōchūs ('bookhouse', 'library'), yet the components 'book' and 'house' were kept. Certain categories of words seem to have been more susceptible. Nearly all words relating to sexual intercourse and sexual organs as well as "impolite" words for bodily functions were ignored in favor of words borrowed from Latin or Ancient Greek. The Old English synonyms are now mostly either extinct or considered crude or vulgar, such as arse/ass.

Some words were forgotten while other near-synonyms in Old English replaced them ('limb' remains in common use, but lið remains only dialectally as lith). Many of these changes came with the introduction of Old Norse and Norman French words, while others fell away due to natural evolution.

== Animals ==
Modern English has no Germanic words for 'animal' in the general sense of 'non-human being'. Old English: dēor, gesceaft, gesceap, nēat and iht were all eclipsed by 'animal', 'beast', 'creature' and 'critter'.

- ācweorna: squirrel. Displaced by Anglo-Norman esquirel and Old French escurel, from Vulgar Latin scuriolus, diminutive of scurius, variant of Latin sciurus, from Ancient Greek σκίουρος (skíouros). Compare German Eichhorn, Dutch eekhoorn, Icelandic ikorni, Swedish ekorre, Danish egern, Norwegian ekorn/ikorn.
- āðexe: 'lizard'. Lizard was borrowed into Middle English from Old French lesarde, from Latin lacertus. The earliest occurrence of the word (spelled lusarde) is in the poem Piers Plowman (written about 1360–1399). Old English āðexe does survive dialectally as ask ('newt', 'eft', 'lizard'): cf. German Eidechse, Dutch hagedis.
- ælepūte: 'burbot'. The Old French word borbote had replaced ælepūte by the Middle English period. 'Burbot' first occurred in English around 1475. The modern descendant of ælepūte, 'eelpout', is occasionally used for the burbot, although it has come to define a different animal.
- cāwelwyrm: 'caterpillar' (see lēafwyrm).
- culfre: 'dove', 'pigeon' has survived dialectally as 'culver', which the AHD believes comes from Vulgar Latin colombula. The OED acknowledges this possibility, but asserts that it is more likely native. 'Culver' is first attested in English around 825 and 'dove' around 1200. The Middle English dove is thought to come from Old English, but the assumed form (*dūfe) is not attested, cf. dūfedoppa below. It is most likely to have been common Germanic.
- dēor: 'animal', 'beast'. Dēor is the etymon of English 'deer', although dēor as 'deer' is attested as early as around 893 by Alfred the Great. At some point in the Middle English period the more specific meaning of 'deer' became common, with the original meaning becoming lost by the end of the period. Compare German Tier, Dutch dier, Swedish djur, Danish and Norwegian dyr, Icelandic dýr.
- dūfedoppa: 'pelican'. The word pelican was borrowed into Middle English, ultimately from Ancient Greek.
- ened: 'duck', 'drake'. 'Drake' first appeared around 1300 and ened was lost thereafter. The AHD says the origin is unknown. Old High German antrahho seems to be a combination of ant (cognate of Old English ened) and trahho (cognate of drake), but the OED holds that the conjectured cognate in Old English (unattested *andrake) "has no basis of fact". The word ened likely has a PIE origin, compare Latin anas, Lithuanian antis and Old Greek nēssa ('duck'). 'Duck' comes from a theoretical Old English word *duce, presumably from the verb ducan ('duck', 'dive'). Compare with the German Ente, Dutch eend, Common Scandinavian and.
- fifalde: 'butterfly'. Old English had the word butorflēoge (of dubious origin, although the ultimately Greek word "butter" is the first element) as early as 1000 which overtook the Germanic fifalde. Compare with Old High German fîfaltarâ, German Falter, Old Saxon vivoldara, Southern Dutch vijfwouter, Old Norse fifrildi, Icelandic fiðrildi, Swedish fjäril.
- firgenbucca: 'ibex'. 'Ibex' is borrowed from Latin ibex originally written ibecks in Edward Topsell's "The historie of foure-footed beastes" (1607). 'Firgenbucca' is a compound of firgen ('wooded height', 'mountain') (compare with Gothic fairguni ('mountain'), Old High German Fergunna ('Ore Mountains')) and bucca ('buck') (compare with modern German Steinbock, Dutch (alpen) steenbok ('ibex'), English stonebuck).
- gesceaft, gesceap: 'creature'. Gesceap, the etymon of English 'shape', is documented as far back as around 1050. It had many meanings in Old English: 'creature', 'creation', 'structure', 'form', 'figure', 'configuration', 'pudendum', 'decree' and 'destiny'. 'Creature', ultimately from Latin, was borrowed around 1300 before the borrowing of the word 'create'. Gesceaft ('creation', 'origin', 'constitution', 'nature', 'species') has the same etymological root as gesceap. It is documented as early as 888 and occurs with this meaning in various forms as late as around 1579, as schaft. Compare to Dutch past participle geschapen for the verb scheppen ('to shape') German schaffen ('to shape'), Geschöpf ('creature').
- hacod: 'mullet'. The OED lists hacod/haked as a dialectal name for a large pike and has a citation as late as 1847, but it is not listed in any modern dictionary. 'Mullet' was borrowed into Middle English, ultimately from Ancient Greek. It is probably akin to haca ('hook'). Compare with modern English hake, Dutch heek ('hake'), German Hechte ('esox').
- hæferblǣte: 'bittern'. 'Bittern' entered Middle English around 1000 as botor which was borrowed from Old French butor.
- higera: 'jay'. The Old French word jai was borrowed into Middle English around 1310. The AHD states that it may come from the Latin forename Gaius, but it gives no reason for the semantic change. The OED does not address the Gaius theory, only stating that it cannot be identified with Old French gai ('gay'). It instead states that it is from Old High German gâhi ('swift', 'quick', 'lively') without mentioning the likelihood. Compare with German Häher.
- hwilpe: 'curlew'. The Middle English form curleu was borrowed from Old French courlieu, which may be onomatopoeic. The OED also believes that it is probably onomatopoeic, but notes that it was assimilated with courlieu, curleu ('courier'), which is ultimately from Latin currere ('to run').
- iht: 'creature'. (See gesceap.)
- lēafwyrm: 'caterpillar', literally 'leaf-worm', 'leaf insect'. Webster's Dictionary (1897) lists 'leaf-worm' as "a caterpillar that devours leaves", but no modern dictionaries list it. The cawel in cawelwyrm was a loan from Latin caulis ('cabbage') and it was last attested around 1000, as cawelwurm. Mælsceafa ('caterpillar') is attested as far back as Old English (around 1000 in the writings of Ælfric) and as late as 1398, as malshaue. Mæl (meaning roughly 'meal' as in 'mealworm') is attested only in the compound mælsceafa, but it has many well-documented cognates in other Germanic languages, such as Old Icelandic and Swedish. The second component shares its root with 'shave'. The ultimately Latin-derived caterpillar was first borrowed into English around 1440 as catyrpel.
- mǣlsceafa: 'caterpillar'. (See lēafwyrm). Compare with Dutch meelworm (meel = flour, which it likes to eat and can be found in).
- mereswīn: 'dolphin', 'porpoise', literally 'sea-swine'. It is attested in Bald's Leechbook from the 10th century. The OED does not list 'mereswine' as archaic or obsolete, but the last citation given is by Frank Charles Bowen in his Sea Slang: a Dictionary of the Old-timers' Expressions and Epithets (1929). The OED lists sea-swine ('porpoise') (the last citation being for 1884) as "obsolete except dialectic". Dolphin entered English in the 12th century: it is ultimately from Ancient Greek. Compare with Dutch meerzwijn ('harbour porpoise', lit. sea-swine) and German Schweinswal ('porpoise', literally 'pig's whale').
- mūshāfoc: 'buzzard', literally 'mouse-hawk'. It is not clear which bird of prey was being referred to. The meanings that the OED lists for 'mouse-hawk' are short-eared owl, hen harrier and rough-legged buzzard, but 'mouse-hawk' is an alternate name, not the main name. The Middle English word busard was borrowed around 1300, ultimately from Latin būtēo.
- ryðða: 'mastiff'. The word mastiff was borrowed around 1387, ultimately from Latin.
- scræb: 'cormorant'. Cormorant was borrowed around 1320 as cormerant, ultimately from the Latin words for raven and sea. Probably akin to (or a variant of) scræf ('cormorant'). Compare with German Scharbe, Common Scandinavian skarv.
- sisemūs: 'dormouse'. Dormouse (first attested in English around 1425) is not a combination of door and mouse. Some lexicographers, including the editorial staff of the AHD, believe that it came from Anglo-Norman dormeus ('inclined to sleep', 'hiberating'), which is ultimately from Latin dormire ('to sleep'). The OED, citing the Dutch words slaep-ratte ('sleep rat') and slaep-muys ('sleep mouse'), acknowledges the possibility of this derivation, but also suggests that the first element is akin to Old Norse dár ('benumbed').
- wōrhana, wildhænn: 'pheasant'. Pheasant was borrowed into English in 1299 as fesaund, ultimately from Ancient Greek.
- wyrm: 'serpent', 'snake', 'dragon', 'insect'. The OED lists all entries of wyrm/worm with this meaning as archaic. The latest citation with this meaning is from William Morris's book The Life and Death of Jason (1867). The modern sense of worm goes back as far as 1000. Compare with Swedish orm, Nynorsk orm ('snake', 'serpent').

== Body parts ==
- earsgang: 'anus' (literally arse-exit). Anus did not enter English until 1658 and was adopted directly from Latin, with no intermediary. The OED says that arse (the ears of earsgang is its etymon) is "obsolete in polite use". The AHD tags ass as "vulgar slang". As late as 1704, Jonathan Swift wrote "after your Arse" in his book The Battle of the Books, which simply meant 'behind you'. (See setl, ūtgang.).
- feorhbold, feorhhold, feorhhus: 'body'. (See also: līc, līcfæt, līchoma.)
- hrēsel: 'radius (bone). The word radius is Latin and its specific anatomical meaning was first used in English in 1615.
- līc: 'body','trunk'. Līc (which was at various times spelled like, lich, lych, lyche and lyke) is attested as far back as around 900 and the last citation given with this more general meaning is from around 1400. However, the last citation with the meaning of 'corpse' is from 1895. The word is used in compounds such as lych-gate, lych-owl (so called because its screeching was thought to forebode death) and lyke-wake (the watch kept over a dead body at night). The word is etymologically akin to like, so its original meaning is thought to be 'form', 'shape'. (See also: feorhbold, feorhhold, feorhhus, līcfæt, līchoma.) Compare with the following words in other languages for 'corpse': German Leiche, Dutch lijk, Swedish lik, Norwegian lik and Danish lig.
- līcfæt, līchoma: 'body'. (See also: feorhbold, feorhhold, feorhhus, līc.) Compare with German Leichnam ('corpse'), Dutch lichaam, Swedish lekamen, Nynorsk lekam and Danish legeme.
- lið: 'joint', 'limb'. Lið (later spelled lith) is attested as early as around 900 and the latest citation in the OED is 1872. The OED considers all modern occurrences to be archaic or dialectal. However, the phrase "life and limb" may be an altered form of an earlier "lith and limb"; cf. "kith and kin". Compare with German Glied, Dutch lid, Swedish led, Danish led and Norwegian ledd.
- midhriðre: 'diaphragm'.
- nebb: 'face'. The OED gives the modern definitions of the Scottish, Irish English, Northern English for neb, such as 'bird's beak' and 'an animal's nose', but the last citation given with the meaning 'a person's face' is from 1525. (See also: ondwlita, onsīen.) Compare English ness ('promontory'), Dutch neb ('beak').
- ōcusta, ōxn: 'armpit'. Armpit first appeared in English as arme-pytt around 1400. The former is now used dialectally as oxter ('armpit', 'arm'), and it is probably akin to axle. Compare with German Achsel, Dutch oksel, Swedish axel (shoulder), Norwegian aksel (shoulder).
- ondwlita: 'face'. (See also: nebb, onsīen.) Compare with German Antlitz, Swedish anlete.
- onsīen: 'face' (See also: nebb, ondwlita.) Compare with German (An)gesicht, Dutch aangezicht.
- ōxn: 'armpit'. (See also: ōcusta.)
- setl: 'anus'. (See also: earsgang, ūtgang.)
- teors: 'penis'. (See also: wæpen.) Penis, which did not enter English until 1578, was borrowed directly from Latin.
- ūtgang: 'anus'. Literally 'exit', 'out-path', (See also: earsgang, setl.) Compare German Ausgang, Dutch uitgang ('exit').
- wæpen: 'penis'. (See also: teors.)
- wiðobān: 'collarbone'.

== Colours ==
- æppelfealu: 'orange'. Literally 'apple-pale'.
- basurēadan: 'purple'. Literally 'purple-red'.
- geolurēad: 'orange'. Literally 'yellow-red'.
- weolucbasu: 'purple'. Literally 'whelk-purple'.

== Other words ==
- andwurde, andwyrde: 'to answer'. A combination of the prefix and- ('against', akin to Greek anti-) and wurde ('word'). By the end of the 12th century, andwurde had been replaced by andswerian ('answer'), (containing swear, probably Common Germanic, attested at least before 900). Compare with German Antwort, Dutch antwoord.
- æðele: 'noble'; also æðelu: 'noble descent'; æðeling: 'hero' and ēðel: 'native land', 'home'. Once common words with many compounds, they are only in Modern English as the loanword edelweiss and some proper nouns such as Ethel (the same Germanic root gives the Ad- in Adelaide, Adolph and Albert). The Latin-derived words noble and gentle (in its original English meaning of 'noble') were both borrowed into English around 1230. Compare with German edel, Dutch edel, English athel.
- ge-: a prefix used extensively in Old English, originally meaning 'with', but later gaining other usages, such as being used grammatically for the perfect tense. In Middle English it became y or i, and it was still common in southern dialects in the 14th century (e.g. Canterbury Tales and Ayenbite of Inwit). In Modern English it survives in handiwork (OE handgeweorc), and in the archaic gemot ('meeting', compare with Witenagemot) and yclept (OE geclypod). It is also found in the rare German loanwords gemütlich and gemütlichkeit. Compare with German ge-, Dutch ge-.
- gerīm: 'number'. (See worn.)
- getæl: 'number'. A combination of the prefix ge- and tæl. Besides the phrase "to tell time", it mainly survived in English with meanings related to speech ('tell', 'tale'). Meanings related to numbers can be found in Germanic cognates. Compare with English teller, German Zahl, Dutch getal, Swedish and Danish tal and Norwegian tall. (See worn.)
- hæmed: 'sex'.
- liger: 'sex'.
- mid: 'with'. Mid was used in Old English in nearly all instances where 'with' is used in Modern English. It is attested in early Old English manuscripts. The latest use cited in the OED is 1547, but this late example may be an intentional archaism. By the end of the 14th century, mid had been overtaken by with. If the first part of midwife is a reflex of this preposition (neither OED nor AHD affirm this derivation), it is the only trace of the with meaning in Modern English. The word probably originally derived from an Indo-European root meaning 'middle' and is akin to the English prefix mid- and Latin medium. It is likely to be akin to Greek μετα (meta, 'in the midst of', 'among', 'with', 'after'). Compare with German mit, Dutch met, Common Scandinavian med and Icelandic með.
- worn: 'number'. Number is akin to Latin numerus which was borrowed as noumbre around 1300, seemingly from French, but its use was doubtlessly reinforced by its presence in other Germanic languages.
- ymb(e): 'around', 'on both sides'. Ymbe was both a preposition and a prefix. The only Modern English word that derives directly from it is the seldom-used Ember days, which is a Christian event. The Germanic loanwords ombudsman and umlaut come from the same Germanic root. It is also related more distantly to Latin words starting with ambi- and Greek words starting with amphi-. Compare with German um, Dutch om, Common Scandinavian om and Icelandic um.
- wīġ: 'war', 'combat', 'martial power'. There were many words of this root in Old English: wīgan, ġewegan ('to fight'), wīġend ('warrior'). This group was used extensively in Old English poetry, due to the alliterative need for a word beginning with 'w'. It comes from the same root as Latin vincere ('to conquer'). Other than the Old Norse-derived wight, this root is missing in Modern English. Compare with Swedish envig ('holmgang') and Dutch wijgand ('warrior').

== See also ==
- Linguistic purism in English
- List of Germanic and Latinate equivalents in English
- List of English words with dual French and Anglo-Saxon variations
- Inkhorn debate

== Sources ==
- The American Heritage Dictionary of the English Language (Fourth ed.). Houghton Mifflin. 2000. ISBN 0-395-82517-2.
