= List of Germanic and Latinate equivalents in English =

This list contains Germanic elements of the English language which have a close corresponding Latinate form. The correspondence is semantic—in most cases these words are not cognates, but in some cases they are doublets, i.e., ultimately derived from the same root, generally Proto-Indo-European, as in cow and beef, both ultimately from PIE *gʷōus.

The meanings of these words do not always correspond to Germanic cognates, and occasionally the specific meaning in the list is unique to English.

Those Germanic words listed below with a Frankish source mostly came into English through Anglo-Norman, and so despite ultimately deriving from Proto-Germanic, came to English through a Romance language (and many have cognates in modern Romance languages). This results in some Germanic doublets, such as yard and garden, through Anglo-Saxons and Anglo-Normans respectively.

== List of Germanic and Latinate equivalents in English ==
| Germanic source | Germanic | Latinate | Latin source |
|---|---|---|---|
| Frankish *bannjan, *bandjan PGmc *laibijaną + *af- PGmc *frasakaną PGmc *fralētaną PGmc *gebaną + *ūp PGmc *bilinnaną | abandon leave (off) forsake forlet give up blin | relinquish abdicate desert renounce | relinquere < re- + linquere abdicāre < ab- + dicātus dēserere < dē- + serere renūntiāre < re- + nūntius |
| PGmc *uzbīdaną Middle English aknowen + knowlechen | abide acknowledge | comply obey observe | Ita. complire, Cat. complir, Spa. cumplir O.Fr. obeir < L. oboediō M.Fr./O.Fr. observer < L. observō |
| PGmc *akaną | aching | painful | L. poena (via Middle English paynful) < Grk. poinḗ |
| PGmc *akiz Frankish *hūrt PGmc *smartōn- PGmc *wai PGmc *sairaz PGmc *þrawō PGmc *warkiz | ache hurt smart woe sore throe wark | pain agony | poena < Gk poinē L.L. agōnia < Gk agōniā |
| PGmc *nadrǭ | adder | viper | M.Fr./O.Fr. vipere < L. vīpera |
| PGmc *lataz, *lētiz (Frankish *lat, *lēti); PGmc *trewwiþō | allegiance troth | fidelity loyalty | fidēlitās lēgālis |
| PGmc *ana + *libą PGmc *kwikwaz | alive quick (living) | animate | animātus < animāre < anima |
| PGmc *alamahtīgaz | almighty | omnipotent | omnipotēns |
| Old English āmasian WGmc *stunōn | amaze stun | astonish | OF estonir |
| Old Norse angr PGmc *wraiþiþo | anger wrath | rage ire | rabiēs īra |
| Old Norse angr (via Middle English angry); WGmc *wraiþiþu/*wraiþ (via Middle English wrattheful) | angry wrathful | irate | īrātus |
| PGmc *armaz Middle English wantsum | arm wantsome | poor | OF/AN povre < L. pauper |
| Frankish *raidjan PGmc *raihwaz PGmc *hrengaz (Frankish *hring); PGmc *līnǭ + *ūp PGmc *sat- PGmc *hlutą PGmc *līstǭ | array row range, rank line, lineup set lot list | series order sequence | seriēs < serere ordō L.L. sequentia < sequēns < sequī |
| Old English andswaru | answer | reply response | O.Fr. replier (via Middle English replyen) < replicō responsum |
| WGmc *agiþahsijā | ask (noun) | lizard | AN lusard < O.Fr. lesard < L. lacertus |
| WGmc *aiskōn PGmc *frignaną PGmc *besōkijaną Old English bedecian PGmc *sōkijaną | ask frain beseech beg seek | inquire request | in + quaerere re + quaerere |
| PGmc *aþulijaz | athel | noble | O.Fr. noble < L. nōbilis |
| PGmc *aitrą | atter | venom poison | O.Fr. venim < V.L. *venīmen < Early M.L. venīnum < C.L. venēnum O.Fr. poison < L. pōtiōnem |
| PGmc *gawaraz PGmc *ana + *breustą PGmc *ūp + *tō + *spōdiz | aware abreast up to speed (idiom, compound word) | cognizant | cognoscere |
| Old Norse agi (Middle English awe) + PGmc *-samaz PGmc *un- + Middle English bilevable | awesome unbelievable | incredible | incrēdibilis |
| Old English bereærn | barn | grange | O.Fr. grange < V.L. *grānica < L. grānum |
| PGmc *bergaz | barrow | mountain | A.N. muntaine |
| WGmc *bauknan Frankish *baukan Old Norse *flǫgra, flakka Frankish *hariwald Frankish *heriberga Frankish *witan | beacon buoy flag herald harbinger guide | signal indicator | M.L. signāle M.L. indicātor |
| PGmc *baumaz | beam | ray | radius |
| Middle English beringe | bearing | attitude posture | Fr. attitude < Ita. attitudine M.F. posture < Ita. postura |
| PGmc *bi- + *furai PGmc *bi- + *furai + *handuz PGmc *ana + *haubudą + *af PGmc *airiz | before beforehand ahead of ere | prior previous | prior prae- + via |
| PGmc *bigetaną | beget | engender | O.Fr. engendrer < L. ingenerāre |
| PGmc *bi- + *hafjaną PGmc *beraną + *-unga Frankish *stikkan Frankish *wīsa PGmc *wegaz PGmc *dēdiz | behaviour bearing etiquette guise way deed | action attitude manner conduct feat | āctiō L.L. aptitūdō V.L. *manuāria < L manuārius < manus M.L. conductus < L condūcere O.F. fait < L factum |
| WGmc *bihaubudōn | behead | decapitate | L.L. dēcapitāre |
| PGmc *bi- + *haitaną PGmc *bidjaną + *-unga | behest bidding | command order | V.L. commandāre ordō |
| PGmc *bī- + *hōfą PGmc *gagniz PGmc *fura- + *dailiz PGmc *bōniz PGmc *blōdisōjaną + *-unga PGmc *wela + *farō | behoof gain foredeal boon blessing welfare | advantage benefit | L.L.*abantaticum benefactum |
| WGmc *bī- + *ginnan PGmc *sturtjaną | begin start | commence initiate | com + initiāre initiāre |
| PGmc *galaubją PGmc *gamenþiją + *sat- PGmc *gōdaz + *spellą PGmc *trewwiþō PGmc *hlinunga | belief mindset gospel truth leaning | creed | crēdere |
| PGmc *bilībaną PGmc *uz- + *bīdaną PGmc *terganą PGmc *stadiz | belive, belave abide tarry stay | remain rest | re- + manere re- + stare |
| PGmc *balgiz PGmc *medi- + *hrefiz PGmc *wambō | belly midriff womb | abdomen | abdomen |
| Middle English bigge (< Old Norse?); PGmc *grautaz PGmc *stōraz, stōriz PGmc *mikilaz PGmc *haugaz (Frankish *houg) | big great stour mickle huge | large grand | larga < largus grandis |
| PGmc *gaburþiz + *dagaz PGmc *jērą + *tīdiz | birthday yeartide | anniversary season | M.L. (diēs) anniversāria O.Fr. saison (via Middle English sesoun) < L. satiō |
| PGmc *blīwą PGmc *hiwją PGmc *daugō PGmc *skadwō PGmc *wlitiz | blee hue dye shade lit | colour | AN colur < OF colour < L color < OL colos |
| PGmc *blōþą + *baþą PGmc *blōþą + *skaiþaną | bloodbath bloodshed | carnage massacre | V.L. *carnaticum O.Fr. macacre, marcacre, macecre, macecle |
| PGmc *blōmô PGmc *blōsmaz PGmc *buddǭ PGmc *burjô (Frankish *burjan) | bloom blossom bud burgeon | flower | flor- < flos |
| PGmc *budagą PGmc *framojaną WGmc *makojaną + *ūp PGmc *līką | body, embodiment frame makeup lich | corpus, corpse carcass cadaver | corpus M.L. carcosium, carcasium < ? cadāver |
| PGmc *burgz | borough | city | O.Fr. cite |
| PGmc *bringaną PGmc *beraną | bring bear | carry | AN carier < Gaulish |
| WGmc *brām | broom | brush | O.Fr. broisse |
| PGmc *brōþar | brotherly | fraternal | frāternus |
| Old English budda Old English bitela | bug beetle | insect | insectum |
| Old English byldan PGmc *raizijaną Old Norse reisa | build rear raise | construct | cōnstruere < com + struere |
| partially from Middle English bildynge | building | construction | O.Fr. construction |
| PGmc *brinnaną | burn | broil | O.Fr. brusler |
| Old English bysig + nisse PGmc *under + *takaną PGmc *nutō | business undertaking note | affair enterprise | ad + facere Fr. entre + prendre |
| Old English cāwel | cole, kale | cabbage | AN caboche |
| PGmc *bugjaną Old English copian | buy cop | purchase | pro- + V.L. *captiare |
| WGmc *kalbam | calf | veal | vitellus, vitulus |
| PGmc *kallōjaną + *-unga Middle English jobbe PGmc *lība- + *werką PGmc *lība- + *laidō PGmc *libēn- + *-unga | calling job lifework livelihood living | career profession vocation occupation employment | L.L. carrāria (via) < Celtic; M.L. professiō vocātiō occupātiō implicāre + -mentum |
| partially from Middle English carien + PGmc *ana | carry on | continue | O.Fr. continuer |
| PGmc *kattuz | cat | felid, feline | fēlis |
| Frankish *gram, *grinjan PGmc *maganą PGmc *skamō | chagrin dismay shame | displeasure dissatisfaction | dis- + L placēre dis- + L satisfactiō |
| PGmc *skihaną (Middle High German schicken); PGmc *trandijaną PGmc *wagōną (Old Saxon wogōn); PGmc *dapraz (via Middle Dutch dapper); Middle English dasshen (< Danish daske); PGmc *swankianą PGmc *ūp + *tūnaz, *tūną | chic trendy in vogue dapper dashing swanky uptown | elegant fashionable stylish | ēlegāns < ēlegere factiō < facere stylus, stilus |
| PGmc *kelþaz PGmc *barną Middle English babe + -y PGmc *kidją (via Old Norse kið); Middle English newborn | child bairn baby kid newborn | infant neonate | īnfāns neonātus |
| PGmc *keusaną PGmc *pikkaną PGmc *walą (Old Norse val) | choose pick wale | opt select | optare sēlēctus < sēligere < sē- + legere |
| PGmc *karzjaną | chore | task | M.L. tasca |
| PGmc *kaldaz PGmc *kaliz + *-igaz PGmc *freusaną | cold chilly freezing | frigid | frigidus |
| PGmc *kwemaną PGmc *landijaną PGmc *raikijaną PGmc *getaną WGmc *makōjan | come land reach get to make (to a place) | arrive | ad + ripa |
| Middle English acquerne? | con | squirrel | O.Fr. escurel < V.L. *scūriolus |
| partially from Old English cōc | cook | chef | Fr. chef |
| PGmc *kūz PGmc *bulô PGmc *nautą PGmc *uhsô PGmc *steuraz PGmc *wīsundaz (Old High German wisunt); Old High German ūrohso | cow bull neat ox steer bison aurochs | beef cattle | bōs/bovis V.L. capitale |
| PGmc *kraftuz + Middle English -man | craftsman | artisan | V.L. *artītiānus |
| PGmc *dagaz + *likaz | daily | diurnal quotidian | diurnalis quotidianus |
| PGmc *durzaną Middle English boldnesse | daring boldness | audacity | audācitās |
| PGmc *daudaz + *likaz PGmc *banô + *fullaz | deadly baneful | mortal fatal | mortālis fatum |
| PGmc *dailiz | deal | amount | OF amonter |
| PGmc *dōmjaną Frankish *wardōn PGmc *haldaną PGmc *fōlijaną PGmc *bi- + *þankijaną | deem regard hold feel bethink | judge consider esteem | iūdicāre consīderāre aestimāre |
| PGmc *deuzą PGmc *hirutaz PGmc *dajjǭ (Old English dā); PGmc *hindō PGmc *staggijô PGmc *raihą PGmc *bukkaz | deer hart doe hind stag roe buck | venison | venātiō/nis |
| PGmc *gamainijaz PGmc *bī- + *lūtilaz PGmc *putōną+ *dūn PGmc *lēgaz | demean, bemean belittle put down lower | debase, abase degrade humiliate | L.L. bassus < Oscan or Celtic; L.L. dēgradāre < dē- + gradus L.L. humiliātus < humiliāre < humilis |
| PGmc *dōną PGmc *frumjaną, *framjaną PGmc *under + *takaną | do perform undertake | execute dispatch | M.L. execūtāre < ex(s)equī O.Fr. despeechier < des- + L.L. -pedicāre |
| Old English docga PGmc *hundaz | dog hound | canid, canine | canis |
| PGmc *drunkiz PGmc *sweljaną Old High German garo + ūz Old Norse ves + heill PGmc *sūpaną | drink swill carouse wassail sup, sip | imbibe beverage | imbibere < in + bibere |
| PGmc *dūbǭ | dove | pigeon culver | V.L. pibionem columbula |
| PGmc *ernustuz PGmc *grimmaz PGmc *sternijaz | earnest grim stern | serious grave sober | L.L. sēriōsus gravis sōbrius |
| PGmc *dritō PGmc *erþō PGmc *landą PGmc *grunduz PGmc *landą + *skapiz | dirt earth land ground landscape | soil terrain | partly from Latin solium terrenum < terra |
| PGmc *austrōnijaz PGmc *austrą + *līkaz PGmc *austrą + *warþaz | eastern easterly eastward | oriental | orīri |
| PGmc *etaną PGmc *suppaną PGmc *brekaną + *brauþą PGmc *bankiz PGmc *fōdijaną Middle Dutch snacken PGmc *swelganą PGmc *hnaskwajaną PGmc *takaną + *in PGmc *bītaną PGmc *skirfaną (Old English sceorfan) | eat sup break bread banquet feed snack swallow nosh take in bite scarf | dine consume devour ingest | V.L. diseieunare < dis + ieiunare consūmere dēvorāre ingestus < ingerere |
| PGmc *aldiz, *aldō PGmc *lībą + *tīmô PGmc *lībą + *spannō | eld lifetime lifespan | age | aevitās ( < aevum) + -age |
| PGmc *andijōną PGmc *fullfuljaną PGmc *haldaną PGmc *wrappaną PGmc *stuppōaną PGmc *bilinnaną | end fulfill halt wrap up stop blin | finish complete discontinue terminate | fīnīre complēre dis- + continuāre |
| Old English ǣrendgāst | errand-ghost | angel | angelus |
| PGmc *ebnaz PGmc *flataz PGmc *smōþijaz PGmc *in + *līnǭ PGmc *līnǭ + *ūp PGmc *stadō + *-igaz | even flat smooth in line lined up steady | level planar equal | V.L. *lībellum < lībella L.L. plānāris < plānum aequālis < aequus |
| PGmc *fagraz + Middle English hered | fair, fair-haired | blond, blonde | Middle French blond |
| English fall of the leaf PGmc *harbistaz | fall harvest | autumn | autumnus |
| PGmc *faraną Middle Dutch trecken PGmc *gēną + *ana + *braiþaz PGmc *takaną + *trap- Old Norse rāfa Frankish *wala | fare trek go abroad take a trip rove gallivant | travel journey voyage | V.L. *trepaliāre V.L. *diurnāta viāticum |
| PGmc *fastuz PGmc *hraþa PGmc *snellaz PGmc *kwikwaz PGmc *swīpaną PGmc *spōdigaz, *spēdigaz | fast rathe, rather snell quick swift speedy | rapid | rapidus |
| WGmc *fastinōn PGmc *bindaną | fasten bind | attach | O.Fr. atachier |
| PGmc *fadar + *likaz | fatherly fatherlike | paternal | paternus |
| WGmc *fōlijan PGmc *gawaraz PGmc *tukkaną, *takaną | feeling awareness touch | sentiment sensation | sensus, sentiō |
| PGmc *fehtaną | fight | combat | M.Fr. combat |
| PGmc *fullijaą + *up PGmc *stukkaz PGmc *niwjaną | fill up stock renew | replenish | re + plēnus |
| PGmc *furistaz PGmc *frumistaz PGmc *maginą | first foremost main | primary | prīmus |
| PGmc *flaskǭ | flask, flacon | bottle | L.L. butticula |
| PGmc *floþuz PGmc *hwelbaną PGmc *ubersatjaną | flood overwhelm overset | inundate | inundāre < in + unda |
| PGmc *faihaz PGmc *fijandz | foe fiend | enemy adversary opponent | in + amīcus adversus oppōnēns |
| PGmc *fulgiją Old Norse traþk | follow track | ensue | in- + sequi |
| Old English *fōtman | footman | vaslet butler | O.Fr. vaslet < M.L. *vassellittus O.Fr. buttiler < M.L. botellārius |
| PGmc *formo- PGmc *airis- + *hwīlo PGmc *fure- + *gēnþjaz Old English hwīlum | former erstwhile foregoing, aforegoing whilom | previous preceding | praevius < prae- + via praecēdere < prae- + cēdere |
| PGmc *furai- + Middle English beere Old English forefæder (Old Norse forfaðir?) | forebear forefather | ancestor | antecessor |
| PGmc *fur-*biudan PGmc *bannan- PGmc *fura- + *stallaz | forbid ban forestall | prohibit prevent interdict | prohibēre < pro + habēre praevenīre inter + dicere, dictus |
| PGmc *fura- + Old Norse kasta PGmc *ūt + *lōkōjanan | forecast outlook | projection | prōjectiō < prō + iacere |
| Middle English foregessen | foreguess | assume | assūmō |
| PGmc *fura + *taljanan PGmc *sanþaz + *sagjanan PGmc *fura- +*buþanan PGmc *fura- +*skadwōjanan | foretell soothsay forebode foreshadow | predict | praedīcere |
| PGmc *frijaz | freedom | liberty | lībertās < līber |
| PGmc *frijond + *likaz PGmc *gakundan + *līkaz PGmc *warmaz | friendly kindly warm | amicable | amīcus |
| Frankish *gardo, gardin- PGmc *garda WGmc *parruk Old English pund- Old English pearroc | garden yard park pound paddock | court enclosure | co- + hortus in- + claudere |
| PGmc *gadurojan PGmc *far- + *gadurojan PGmc *gadurojan + *ūp PGmc *kruppaz Old English clyster PGmc *lisanan | gather forgather gather up group cluster lease | assemble | ad + simul |
| PGmc *giftiz PGmc *sali- | gift handsel | present | prae- + essere |
| PGmc *geban PGmc *gafurþojan WGmc*frumjana | give afford furnish | provide | pro + vidēre |
| PGmc *glaþaz PGmc *bliþiz PGmc *fagaraz PGmc *murgijaz PGmc *wunjo-samaz PGmc *hapan PGmc *gliujan PGmc *þurilam (via Old English þyrel); PGmc *kwēmiaz | gladness bliss fairness merriment, mirth winsomeness happiness glee thrill queem | joy felicity pleasure delight | gaudium fēlīcitās placēre dēlēctāre |
| PGmc *guþan PGmc *guþan + *haiduz | god, goddess godhead | deity divine immortal | deus dīvīnus immortalis |
| PGmc *gōdaz PGmc *welō(n); PGmc *hilpō + *fullaz PGmc *gagniz + *fullaz PGmc *hailaz + *samaz PGmc *werþan + *hwīlō | good well helpful gainful wholesome worthwhile | beneficial | beneficium |
| WGmc *gēnan + PGmc *an PGmc *wandjanan | go on wend | proceed | pro- + cedere |
| PGmc *grabą + *gardaz | graveyard | cemetery | O.Fr. cimitiere |
| WGmc *grōnja- PGmc *laskaz | green lush | verdant | viridis |
| Old English griþ (Old Norse grið) | grith | asylum sanctuary | L asȳlum < Grk. ắsūlon sānctuārium |
| PGmc *getiskanan PGmc *faþmaz PGmc *swumto- Frankish *galgo | guess fathom sound gauge | estimate | aestimare |
| partially from Old English gyltiġ | guilty | culpable | O.Fr. culpable |
| PGmc *harjaz + *berg PGmc *hafnaz | harbour haven | port | portus |
| PGmc *harþuz + *skapiz PGmc *uzdailjam | hardship ordeal | difficulty | difficultās |
| PGmc *hatojanan PGmc *laiþojanan PGmc *skarn- (Frankish *skern) | hate loathe scorn | detest | de- + testari |
| WGmc *hōdijan | heed | attention | attentiō |
| PGmc *hauhiþa PGmc *luftuz | height loftiness | altitude elevation | altitūdō (< altus) |
| PGmc *helpan PGmc *ūz- + *baitjanan (Frankish *bētan); PGmc *gebanan + *handuz PGmc *bī + *standanan PGmc *bī + *stadiz | help abet give a hand bestand bestead | aid assist | OF aidier assistere < ad + sistere |
| WGmc *hannja PGmc *kiukīną | hen chicken | pullet poultry | pullus |
| PGmc *harjaz PGmc *fardíz | here ferd | army militia | ML. armāta mīlitia |
| PGmc *hulnis PGmc *bergaz PGmc *mundō PGmc *dūnō, dūnaz | hill barrow mound down, dune | mount | mōns, montis |
| PGmc *huzdą | hoard | cache | Fr. cache < cacher |
| PGmc *hailagaz + *dagaz WGmc *lauba PGmc *brekan WGmc *fur- + *lauba | holiday leave break furlough | vacation | vacātiō |
| PGmc *hailagaz PGmc *gahailagōiðaz | holy hallowed | sacred | sacrāre |
| WGmc *huntōn | hunt | chase | A.N. chacer/O.Fr. chacier |
| PGmc *aujo + *landom PGmc *aujo PGmc *hulmaz | island ait, eyot holm | isle | insula |
| PGmc *hūsą (via Old English hūs); WGmc *wunungu | house woning | domicile residence | domicilium O.Fr. residence < M.L. residentia |
| WGmc *jukkjan PGmc *wurkijanan (via Old Norse yrkja); WGmc *taisijanan WGmc *fur-etanan PGmc *grellanan | itch irk tease fret grill | irritate | irritāre |
| PGmc gakundiz Old English ilca PGmc *brandaz PGmc *brōd- PGmc *sat- PGmc *streun- Frankish *tīr PGmc *līkaz | kind ilk brand breed set strain tier like | type class sort genre | typus < Gk typos classis sors genera |
| PGmc *knoean PGmc *witanan PGmc *spehōjanan (Frankish *spehōn); PGmc *sputtōn PGmc *taljanan | know wit/wot espy spot tell | recognize | re + cognoscere |
| PGmc *lataz PGmc *latjanan | late delayed | tardy | tardus |
| PGmc *lagan (Old Norse lag) + *-fullaz PGmc *gastrahtaz PGmc *fagraz PGmc *rehtaz PGmc *gasundas PGmc *gamaitijaz PGmc *warjanan (Frankish *warand); PGmc *fittjanan | lawful straight fair right, rightful sound meet warranted fitting | legal legitimate, legit just proper | lēgālis M.L. lēgitimātus < lēgitimāre jūstus < jūs proprius |
| Middle English lawiere | lawyer | attorney barrister solicitor | O.Fr. atorné V.L. *barra + O.Fr. -estre M.Fr. soliciteur |
| PGmc *laiþjan PGmc *kuningaz PGmc *haubuþan PGmc *biron PGmc *erloz PGmc *markō PGmc *aþulingaz PGmc *druhtinaz PGmc *þegnaz | leader king head baron earl marquis atheling drighten thane | chief captain emperor count duke prince president ruler | caput imperator comes dux princeps praesidēns partially from Middle English reuler |
| PGmc *langiþo | length | longitude | longitūdō (< longus) |
| PGmc *legjan PGmc *rastjō, rastō PGmc *hlinojanan | lie (down) rest lean (back) | repose recline | re- + pausa re- + clinare |
| PGmc *lūbo | love (noun) | amour | amor |
| PGmc *lubo Old English lufsum Middle English fond, fonned | loving lovesome fond | amorous | amōrōsus |
| Old English mæġdenhād | maidenhood | virginity | O.Fr. virginite < L. virginitās |
| PGmc *managaz PGmc *manigaz + *falþaz PGmc *rīfiz PGmc *taumijanþjaz | many manifold rife teeming | multiple numerous abundant copious | multi + plūs numerosus abundantem copiosus |
| PGmc *ga-makon PGmc *fittjanan PGmc *andswarōjanan + *tō | match fit answer to | correspond | con + respondēre |
| WGmc *mainijan PGmc *be- + *taiknjanan PGmc *standanan + *fura PGmc *ahtalōnan | mean betoken stand for ettle | intend signify | intendere significare |
| PGmc *motijan PGmc *hitjanan (Old Norse hitta) | meet hit | encounter | incontrāre < in + contrā |
| PGmc *medjaz + *dagaz | midday | noon | nona |
| Old Norse mistaka PGmc *blundaz (Old Norse blundra); PGmc *wrangiþō | mistake blunder wrength | error | error (< errāre) |
| PGmc *mōdar + *likaz | motherly | maternal | māternus |
| PGmc *nēhwaz PGmc *nēhwizáz | nigh near | close circa approximate | clausus circum + eā approximatus |
| PGmc *neujaz PGmc *friskaz PGmc *nū | new fresh now | novel modern | novus modernus |
| PGmc *naht + *likaz | nightly | nocturnal | nocturnus |
| PGmc *nurþrōnijaz | northern | septentrional | septentriōnēs |
| Old English nōwiht (Middle English nought) | nought | zero | M.L. zēphirum |
| WGmc *alda PGmc *stal-, *sta- PGmc *aldizo + *līkaz PGmc *jǣron | old stale elderly of yore | ancient antediluvian | V.L. *anteanus < ante ante + diluvium |
| Middle English onfal Old English onrǣs | onfall onrush | attack assault | French attaque O.Fr. assaut |
| PGmc *anþaraz PGmc *aljaz | other else | different alternative | differre alterare |
| PGmc *ufnaz PGmc *herþaz PGmc *stubō PGmc *aistō PGmc *smiþjon | oven hearth stove oast smithy, smithery | kiln furnace | culina fornax |
| PGmc *raidō PGmc *wegaz PGmc *bulaz + *werkam PGmc *drībanan PGmc *paþaz PGmc *strātō | road way boulevard drive path street | route avenue itinerary | rupta itinerantem |
| PGmc *rōō | roo | calmness tranquility | O.It. calma tranquillitās |
| PGmc *rūmą | room | chamber | O.Fr. chambre |
| PGmc *rutjan PGmc *be- + *fūljanan PGmc *be- + *fūlaz | rot defile befoul | putrefy | putrefacere |
| WGmc *hrinþiʀ | rother | animal beast | animal bēstia |
| Old English sǣ | sea | ocean | ōceanus, from Greek Oceanus |
| PGmc *sehwan PGmc *kanjanan | see ken | perceive | per- + capere |
| Old Norse *sœma PGmc *lōkōjanan | seem look | appear | apparere |
| PGmc *seuþanan Middle English bublelen (Middle Low German bubeln); Old English plagian | seethe bubble plaw | boil | bullīre |
| PGmc *selbaz + *haiduz PGmc *galīkaz + *-nassus PGmc *selbaz + *dōmaz | selfhood likeness selfdom | identity | L.L. identitās < idem et idem + -itās |
| PGmc *selbaz + *samaz | selfsame | identical | M.L. identicus + -al |
| PGmc *saljanan Old Saxon *trada PGmc *dailjanan + *in Frankish *borganjan | sell trade deal in bargain | vend | vendere < venum + dare |
| PGmc *skapjanan PGmc *buþlam (Old English bold); PGmc *ūt + *līniōn | shape build outline | form | forma |
| PGmc *skauniz Old English luflīċ Proto-Germanic *fagraz | sheen lovely fair | beautiful | V.L. *bellitātem + PGmc *-fullaz |
| WGmc *skæpa PGmc *lambaz | sheep lamb | mutton | M.L. multō (< Celtic) |
| PGmc *skoppan | shop | store boutique | instaurare L. apothēca < Grk. ăpothḗkē |
| WGmc *skuttjan | shut | close | clausus |
| PGmc *skeuh(w)az | shy | timid | timidus |
| PGmc *sehwiþō PGmc *sehwanan PGmc *kannijanan | sight seeing ken | vision | vidēre/vīsum |
| PGmc *skaljo PGmc *krab-, kraf- PGmc *kunnanan PGmc *listiz | skill craft cunning list | art science | ars scientia |
| PGmc *skaljo + *fullaz PGmc *krab-, kraf- + *-igaz PGmc *gadaftjaz | skillful crafty deft | adept | adeptus < adipiscī |
| PGmc *slǣpanþiaz PGmc *slūmerianþiaz PGmc *īdalaz PGmc *falgō | sleeping slumbering idle fallow | dormant hibernate torpid | dormiēns hībernātus torpidus |
| PGmc *smæl PGmc *lūtilaz PGmc *tindaz Old English wēg, wǣge | small little tiny wee | minute petite diminutive | minūtus < minuere pitinnus diminutivus |
| PGmc *snakon PGmc *wurmiz | snake worm | serpent | serpens |
| PGmc *snakjaną PGmc *graipisōną | snatch grasp | catch seize | partially from AN cachier partially from O.Fr. seisir |
| PGmc *surgo PGmc *karō PGmc *wai | sorrow care woe | grief | OFr grever < L gravare < gravis |
| PGmc *sunþrōnijaz | southern | meridional | merīdiēs |
| PGmc *sprekanan PGmc *taljanan WGmc *prātana | speak talk prate, prattle | converse discourse communication dictation | con- + vertere dis- + currere communicare dictātiō |
| PGmc *stund- PGmc *tīmēn, tīma- PGmc *tīþiz PGmc *hwīlō Old English þrāg Old English spelian PGmc *stuntjanan | stound time tide while throw spell stint | hour moment interval | hōra < Gk hṓra mōmentum intervallum |
| PGmc *stōlaz PGmc *setlaz | stool settle | chair | O.Fr. chaiere |
| PGmc *sundrigaz PGmc *miskjanan | sundry mixed | various miscellaneous | varius miscellus |
| PGmc *swīnam PGmc *farhaz PGmc *sugō WGmc *bairaz Old English picg- Old English hogg | swine farrow sow boar pig hog | pork | porcus |
| PGmc *taikijanan WGmc *skauwojanan PGmc *laizjanan | teach show lear, lere | educate | ēdūcāre < ēdūcere |
| PGmc *taljanan PGmc *kunþjanan PGmc *makojanan *(ga)knēwanaz | tell kithe make known | relate narrate | relatus < re- + ferre narrare |
| PGmc *þankijaną | think | conceive | O.Fr. concevoir |
| PGmc *þankjan PGmc *(ga)þāht- + *-fullaz PGmc *(ga)mentþijan + *-fullaz | thinking thoughtful mindful | pensive | pēnsāre |
| PGmc *þurpą | thorp | village hamlet | O.Fr. village partially from O.Fr. hamel |
| PGmc *(ga)þāhtan Early Modern English hinch PGmc *inkēn PGmc *kliwjo- | thought hunch inkling clue | idea | idea < Gk idea |
| PGmc *þreutanan PGmc *pleg- PGmc *fēraz | threat plight fear | danger peril menace | V.L. *dominarium < dominus periculum minaciae < minari |
| PGmc *taiknan PGmc *markō PGmc *hallō + *markō PGmc *huntōjanan PGmc *stampōjanan | token mark hallmark hint stamp | sign symbol trace indication | signum symbolum < Gk sýmbolon V.L. *tractiāre indicātiō |
| PGmc *tungon PGmc *sprǣkijō PGmc *talō Old English ġeþēode | tongue speech talk atheed | language | V.L. *linguaticum < L. lingua |
| PGmc *tradō | trade | commerce | M.Fr. commerce < L. commercium |
| PGmc *twinjaz PGmc *twai + PGmc *-falþaz PGmc *twī- | twin twofold twi- | double duplicate | duplus duplicātus < duplicāre < duplex |
| PGmc *under + *standan PGmc *getanan PGmc *graipisōn | understand get grasp | comprehend | comprehendere |
| PGmc *ūp- + *haldanan PGmc *bolhstraz PGmc *beranan + *up- PGmc *under + *gurþjanan PGmc *ūp + beranan WGmc skor- + up PGmc *stagaz (Frankish *staka) | uphold bolster bear up undergird upbear shore up stay | support | supportāre |
| PGmc *up- + *luftijan PGmc *raizjan | uplifting raising, rearing | elevating | ē- + levāre |
| PGmc *ūtizon PGmc *sagjanan | utter say | pronounce | pro- + nuntiare |
| PGmc *ūtizon WGmc *alnaz + *tō-gaduraz PGmc *fullīkō PGmc *hailaz +*līkō | utterly altogether fully wholly | totally | tōtālis |
| PGmc *wadjojan PGmc *mizdō, meidō PGmc *hūrja PGmc *azanōną | wage meed hire earnings | salary | salārium |
| PGmc *wakan PGmc *bīdanan Old English tergan PGmc *woenijanan | wait, await bide tarry ween | expect | ex + spectāre |
| WGmc *werʀu + *mangārī | warmongering | belligerent | belligerāns |
| WGmc *warnōjanan + *-unga PGmc *tupp- + *af- | warning tip off | notice alert recommendation admonition | nōtitia It all'erta < L ērigere M.L. recommendātiō admonitiō |
| PGmc *watskanan PGmc *klainisōn PGmc *hrainisōn PGmc *labōjanan PGmc *baðojanan PGmc *skrubbanan | wash cleanse rinse lave bathe scrub | launder | M.L. lavandāria < lavare |
| PGmc *wakan PGmc *kōpjanan PGmc *behaldanan | watch keep behold | observe supervise | ob + servāre super + videre |
| PGmc *wakanan PGmc *wakanþjaz PGmc *warō + *-igaz | watchful waking wary | vigilant | vigilāre |
| PGmc *wēpną | weapon | arms | arma |
| PGmc *wadjōjanan | wed | marry | marītāre |
| PGmc *wadjō + *laikaz | wedlock | marriage | V.L. *maritaticum |
| PGmc *wurdiz PGmc *framiþjaz PGmc *uzdaz PGmc *þwerhwaz PGmc *unkunþaz Old English ūtlendisc PGmc *alja- + *rīkjan PGmc *argaz PGmc *faigjáz | weird fremd odd queer uncouth outlandish eldritch eerie fey | strange | extrāneus |
| PGmc *weralþeilīkaz PGmc *erþō + *likaz | worldly earthly | mundane secular | L.L. mundānus < mundus saeculāris |
| PGmc *wopijanan PGmc *grētanan Old Norse baula Old Norse vǣla PGmc *hwīnanan PGmc *krītanan PGmc *murnanan PGmc *siubanan, *seubōnan, *subōjanan | weep greet (cry), regret bawl wail whine cry mourn sob | lament deplore | lāmentārī < lāmentum dēplōrāre < dē- + plōrāre |
| PGmc *gawehtiz + *-igaz WGmc *mainijanan + *-unga + *fullaz PGmc *ki- (Old English cǣġe) | weighty meaningful key | important grave | importāns gravis |
| PGmc *westrōnijaz PGmc *westrą + *līkaz PGmc *westrą + *warþaz | western westerly westward | occidental | occidere |
| PGmc *hwītaz | white | blank | O.Fr. blanc |
| PGmc *(ga)hailaz | whole | entire | integer |
| PGmc *wīdas PGmc *braiþiþō PGmc *spannō | width breadth span | latitude | latitūdō (< latus) |
| PGmc *wilþjiaz PGmc *faliz PGmc *grimmaz | wild fell grim | savage feral | silvaticus < silva fera |
| PGmc *winną | win | victory | partially from AN victorie |
| PGmc *wīsadōmaz | wisdom | prudence sagacity | AN prudence < L. prūdentia sagācitās |
| PGmc *wīsaz PGmc *klufraz PGmc *in + *gasihþ + *fullaz PGmc *in + *leuhtam PGmc *kōniz PGmc *knoeanan + *laikam PGmc *skreuwon | wise clever insightful enlightened keen knowledgeable shrewd | prudent intelligent sapient | prudēns < providēns intelligēns sapiēns |
| Old English wiċċe | witch | sorceress | AN sorceresse |
| Middle English withdrawen | withdraw | disengage | M.Fr. désengager |
| Middle English withtaken | withtake | receive | O.Fr. receivre < L. recipiō |
| Middle English wysard | wizard | sorcerer | O.Fr. sorcer (Middle English sorcerere) |
| PGmc *wunskjan PGmc *weljanan PGmc *gernjanan PGmc *langojanan PGmc *lustuz PGmc *wana-, wanēn (Old Norse vanta) | wish will yearning longing lust want | desire cupidity | desiderāre cupiditās |
| Old English *wīfman + PGmc *likaz WGmc *gurilā + PGmc *-iskaz | womanly girlish | feminine | femininus |
| PGmc *wambō | womb | matrice uterus | O.Fr. matrice < L. mātrīx uterus |
| PGmc *wundrōną | wonder | ponder | O.Fr. ponderer (Middle English ponderen) < L. ponderāre |
| Old English ġewunod | wont | accustomed | OF acoustumer |
| PGmc *widuz PGmc *hulto- PGmc *walþuz WGmc *busk PGmc *graibō PGmc *bruskaz PGmc *þekwatjan (Old English þiccet); PGmc *furhiþō (Old English fyrhþ); PGmc *skagjan Old English wuduland | wood (a wood) holt weald/wold bush, boscage grove brush thicket frith shaw woodland | forest copse, coppice | M.L. *foresta, partially < L.L. forestis; partially < Frankish *forhist V.L. *colpaticium |
| PGmc *widuz + *werką (Middle English woodewerk) | woodwork | carpentry | AN carpenterie |
| PGmc *wurdan + PGmc *bōkiz | wordbook | dictionary | dictiōnārium |
| PGmc *werkan PGmc *dreuganan PGmc *swinkanan | work drudge, drudgery swink | labour | labor |
| PGmc *werþaz (via Old English *weorþiġ and Middle English worthy) | worthy | valuable | O.Fr. value (via Middle English value) + -able (via Middle English -able) |
| PGmc *wrītanan + *-unga PGmc *gawritan | writing writ | script | scrīptum < scrībere |
| PGmc *wurdiz PGmc *dōmaz PGmc *uzlagą | wyrd doom orlay | fate destiny | fatum dēstināre |
| PGmc *jǣram + *likaz | yearly | annual | annalis |
| WGmc *gelwa | yellow | ochre | ochra < Gk ṓkhra |
| WGmc *jugunþiz + *fullaz PGmc *jungas | youthful young | juvenile immature | iuvenis immātūrus < in- + mātūrus |
| PGmc *juwunþiz PGmc *tehuniz + *haiduz | youth teenhood | adolescence | adolescere < ad- + alescere |

* reconstructed form

== Noun/adjective doublets ==
In particular, the use of Latinate words in the sciences gives us pairs with a native Germanic noun and a Latinate (or Ancient Greek-derived) adjective:

- animals: ant/formic, ape/simian, bear/ursine, bee/apian, bird/avian, butterfly/papilionaceous, carp/cyprine, cat/feline, chicken/gallinaceous, cod/gadoid, cow (or ox)/bovine, crow/corvine, deer/cervine, dog/canine, dove/columbine, duck/anatine, fish/piscine, fox/vulpine, goat/caprine, goose/anserine, gull/larine, hare/leporine, horse/equine, lion/leonine, mew/larine, mouse (or rat)/murine, ostrich/struthious, pig/porcine, rabbit/cunicular, reindeer/rangiferine, sheep/ovine, snake/anguine (or serpentine), spider/arachnid, starling/sturnine, swan/cygnine or cygnean, tortoise (or turtle)/testudinal, wasp/vespine, whale/cetacean, wolf/lupine, worm/vermian, man/human or hominid (gender specific: man/masculine, woman/feminine).
- physiology: arm/brachial, blood/sanguine, body/corporal, bone/osteotic, brain/cerebral, chest/pectoral, ear/aural, eye/ocular or visual, finger/digital, foot/pedal, hair/pilar, hand/manual, head/capital, heart/cardial or cardiac, kidney/renal, leg/crural, lips/labial, liver/hepatic, lung/pulmonary, mind/mental, mouth/oral, nail/ungual, neck/cervical, nipple/papillary, nose/nasal, shoulder/scapular, sole of the foot/plantar, thigh/femoral, tongue/lingual, tooth/dental.
- astronomy: earth/terrestrial, moon/lunar, star/stellar, sun/solar.
- sociology: brother/fraternal, father/paternal, mother/maternal, sister/sororal, son or daughter/filial, uncle/avuncular, wife/uxorial.
- other: bell/tintinnabulary, bloom/floral, boat (or ship)/naval, book/literary, bridge/pontine, church/ecclesiastical, clothes/sartorial, cooking/culinary, door/portal, earl/comital, edge/marginal, fighter/military, fire/igneous, house/domestic, ice/glacial, king/regal, land (country)/national, law/legal, light/optical, marsh/paludal, ring/annular, sea (ocean)/marine, sight/visual, sword/gladiate, town/urban, tree/arboreal, wall/mural, water/aquatic, wind/vental, window/fenestral.

== See also ==
- Collateral adjective
- List of collateral adjectives (Wiktionary)
- Lists of English loanwords by country or language of origin
- List of English words with dual French and Anglo-Saxon variations
- List of English words of French origin
- List of English Latinates of Germanic origin
- Latin influence in English
- Changes to Old English vocabulary
- Anglish

== Sources ==
- Online Etymology Dictionary
- Merriam-Webster Online
- Dictionary of Etymology: the Origins of American English Words. Robert K. Barnhart. ISBN 0-06-270084-7
