= Doublet (linguistics) =

Words with the same historical origin

In etymology, doublets (alternatively etymological twins or twinlings) are words in a given language that come from the same etymon. Many doublets in English resulted from borrowing of related words from other languages. While doublets may be synonyms, the characterization is usually reserved for words that have diverged significantly in meaning: for example, the English doublets pyre and fire are distinct terms with related meanings that both ultimately descend from the Proto-Indo-European (PIE) word *péh₂ur.

Words with similar meanings but subtle differences contribute to the richness of modern English, and many of these are doublets. A good example consists of the doublets frail and fragile. (These are both ultimately from the Latin adjective fragilis, but frail evolved naturally through its slowly changing forms in Old French and Middle English, whereas fragile is a learned borrowing directly from Latin in the 15th century.)

Another example of nearly synonymous doublets is aperture and overture (the commonality behind the meanings is "opening"). Doublets may also develop contrasting meanings, such as the terms host and guest, which come from the same PIE word *gʰóstis and already existed as a doublet in Latin, and then Old French, before being borrowed into English. Doublets also vary with respect to how far their forms have diverged. For example, the connection between levy and levee is easy to guess, whereas the connection between sovereign and soprano is harder to guess.

== Origin ==
Doublets can develop in various ways, according to which route the two forms took from the origin to their current form. Complex, multi-step paths are possible, though in many cases groups of terms follow the same path. Simple paths are discussed below, with the simplest distinction being that doublets in a given language can have their root in the same language (or an ancestor), or may originate in a separate language.

=== Native origin ===
Most simply, a native word can at some point split into two distinct forms, staying within a single language, as with English too which split from to.

Alternatively, a word may be inherited from a parent language, and a cognate borrowed from a separate sister language. In other words, one route was direct inheritance, while the other route was inheritance followed by borrowing. In English this means one word inherited from a Germanic source, with, e.g., a Latinate cognate term borrowed from Latin or a Romance language. In English this is most common with words which can be traced back to Indo-European languages, which in many cases share the same proto-Indo-European root, such as Romance beef and Germanic cow. However, in some cases the branching is more recent, dating only to proto-Germanic, not to PIE; many words of Germanic origin occur in French and other Latinate languages, and hence in some cases were both inherited by English (from proto-Germanic) and borrowed from French or another source – see List of English Latinates of Germanic origin. The forward linguistic path also reflects cultural and historical transactions; often the name of an animal comes from Germanic while the name of its cooked meat comes from Romance. Since English is unusual in that it borrowed heavily from two distinct branches of the same language family tree – Germanic and Latinate/Romance – it has a relatively high number of this latter type of etymological twin. See list of Germanic and Latinate equivalents in English for further examples and discussion.

Less commonly, a native word may be borrowed into a foreign language, then reborrowed back into the original language, existing alongside the original term. An English example is animation and anime "Japanese animation", which was reborrowed from Japanese アニメ anime. Such a word is sometimes called a Rückwanderer (German for "one who wanders back").

=== Borrowed origin ===
In case of twins of foreign origin, which consist of two borrowings (of related terms), one can distinguish if the borrowing is of a term and a descendant, or of two cognate terms (siblings).

Etymological twins are often a result of chronologically separate borrowing from a source language. In the case of English, this usually means once from French during the Norman invasion, and again later, after the word had evolved separately in French. An example of this is warranty and guarantee.

Another possibility is borrowing from both a language and its daughter language. In English this is usually Latin and some other Romance language, particularly French – see Latin influence in English. The distinction between this and the previous is whether the source language has changed to a different language or not.

Less directly, a term may be borrowed both directly from a source language and indirectly via an intermediate language. In English this is most common in borrowings from Latin, and borrowings from French that are themselves from Latin; less commonly from Greek directly and through Latin.

In case of borrowing cognate terms, rather than descendants, most simply an existing doublet can be borrowed: two contemporary twin terms can be borrowed.

More remotely, cognate terms from different languages can be borrowed, such as sauce (Old French) and salsa (Spanish), both ultimately from Latin, or tea (Dutch thee) and chai (Hindi), both ultimately from Chinese. This last pair reflects the history of how tea has entered English via different trade routes.

== By language ==
=== English ===
Many thousands of English examples can be found, grouped according to their earliest deducible Indo-European ancestor. In some cases over a hundred English words can be traced to a single root. Some examples in English include:

- host and guest: via Latin and Germanic
- strange and extraneous: Old French, Latin
- word and verb: Germanic, Latin
- shadow, shade, and shed, all from Old English sceadu "shadow, shade"
- stand, stay, state, status, and static: native, Middle French, Latin (twice), and Ancient Greek via Latin, all from the same Indo-European root
- chief, chef, cape, capo, caput, and head: French (twice), Latin via French, Italian, Latin, and Germanic, all from the same Indo-European word *ka(u)put "head")
- secure and sure: Latin, French
- capital, cattle, and chattel: Latin, Norman French, and standard French
- plant and clan: Latin, Latin via Old Irish
- right, rich, raj, rex, regalia, regal, reign, royal, and real: Germanic, Celtic, Sanskrit, Latin (twice), French (three times), and Portuguese cognates, all ultimately from Proto-Indo-European *h₃reǵ- "to straighten, to right oneself, right, just"
- carton and cartoon, both ultimately Italian cartone "carton"
- ward and guard: Old English, French, both originally Germanic; also warden and guardian; as well as warranty and guarantee
- chrism and cream: Greek via Latin, Greek via Latin and French
- cow and beef: Germanic via Old English, Latin via French; both ultimately Proto-Indo-European *gʷṓws
- pipe and fife: both from Germanic, via Old English and German
- wheel, cycle, and chakra: Germanic, Greek via Latin, Sanskrit, all from Proto-Indo-European *kʷékʷlo- "wheel"
- frenetic and frantic: Greek, via Old French and Latin
- cave and cavern, from Latin cavus, via French and Germanic languages
- direct, from Latin, and derecho, from Latin via Spanish
- price, prise, prize, praise, pry (a lever), and prix, all from French, some diverged in English
- corn, kernel and grain, all ultimately from Proto-Indo-European *grnóm, the first two natively via Proto-Germanic (g → k), the last via Latin, borrowed from Old French
- clock, cloche, cloak, and glockenspiel, from Medieval Latin clocca "bell", via Middle Dutch, French (twice) and German
- pique and pike (weapon), both from Middle French pique
- mister, master, meister, maestro, mistral (a Mediterranean wind), and magistrate are all ultimately derived from Latin magister "teacher"
- equip, ship, skiff, and skipper, from Old French, Old English, Old Italian via Middle French, and Middle Dutch, all from Proto-Germanic *skipą "ship"
- domain, demesne, dominion, and dungeon, all from French
- Slav and slave, from Latin and French, both ultimately from Proto-Slavic via Greek
- hemp, cannabis, and canvas, the former natively through Proto-Germanic, the latter two via Greek and Latin, all ultimately from either Proto-Indo-European or a very early shared borrowing from Scythian or Thracian
- discrete and discreet, from Latin, diverged in English, now homophones
- apothecary, boutique, and bodega, all ultimately from Greek via Latin and then, respectively, via Old French, via Old Occitan and Middle French, and via Spanish.
- care, charity, cheer, cherish, and whore, from French, Anglo-Norman, and Germanic, all ultimately from Proto-Indo-European *kāro-, *kéh₂ro- "dear; loved"
- garden and yard, the former via Anglo-Norman, the latter through Germanic.
- zealous and jealous, the former from Greek, the latter via Old French.
- tradition and treason: Latin via Old French.
- short, shirt, skirt and curt, the first two from Old English, the third from Old Norse and the fourth from Latin, all ultimately from the Proto-Indo-European *(s)ker-, "to cut"
- reave and rob, the former from Old English, the latter from Frankish and Old High German via Latin, via Anglo-Norman, all ultimately from Proto-Germanic *raubōną, "to steal"
- think and thank, both ultimately from the Proto-Indo-European *teng-, "to think". "Thank" meant "to give kind thoughts".
- arm and art, from Old English and Old French, both ultimately from Proto-Indo-European *h₂er-, "to fit, to fix, to put together, to slot"
- know, can, note, notice, noble, ignorant, recognize, normal, cognition, narrate, notorious, gnome, paranoid, nous, and gnosis. From Old English (twice), Old French (5 times), Latin (4 times), and Greek (4 times). All can be derived partially or entirely from Proto-Indo-European ǵneh₃- "to recognise, to know".
- horse, hurry, carry, and car. From Old English (twice) and Gaulish (twice). All ultimately originate from Proto-Indo-European *ḱers- "to run".
- the, that, this, and there. All originate from Proto-Indo-European *só "this, that", via Old English.
- blink, blank, bleach, and bleak. All originate from Proto-Indo-European *bʰleyǵ- "to shine" via Proto-Germanic.
- green, grey, grass, and grow. All originate from Proto-Indo-European *gʰreh₁- "to grow" via Old English.
- yellow, gold, glow, and gall. All originate from Proto-Indo-European *ǵʰelh₃- via Old English.
- king, kind, kin, nation, gentle, general, generic, genre, gender, generous, nature, naive, native, germ, genie, engine, generate, genus, genius, genitalia, genesis, gonad, and gene. From Old English (3 times), Old French (13 times), Latin (4 times) and Greek (3 times). All ultimately from Proto-Indo-European *ǵenh₁- "to produce, to beget, to give birth".
- bear, brown, bore, berry, fierce, feral, ferocious, panther, and therapod, from Old English (4 times), Old French (twice), Latin, and Greek (twice), all ultimately from Proto-Indo-European *ǵʰwer- "wild animal".
- strait, strict and stretto, from French, Latin and Italian
- policy ("principle of management"), polity and police, from various French forms derived from the Latin polītīa and Ancient Greek polīteíā. policy ("insurance contract") is an unrelated, homographic and homophonous false cognate.
- sky, hide, hut, ultimately from Proto-Indo-European *(s)kewH- "to cover, conceal, hide". skin is unrelated.

There are many more doublets from Greek, where one form is a vernacular borrowing and the other a learned borrowing, such as scandal and slander, both from σκάνδαλον.

==== Norman vs. standard or Modern French ====
Many words of French origin were borrowed twice or more. There were at least three periods of borrowing: one that occurred shortly after the Norman Conquest and came from Norman French, one in the thirteenth and fourteenth centuries from standard (Parisian) French at the time when English nobles were switching from French to English, and a third one during the sixteenth to nineteenth century, when France was at the height of its power and international influence. Examples of doublets from the first and second periods are catch vs. chase, cattle vs. chattel, and warden vs. guardian. More recent borrowings are often distinguished by maintaining the French spelling and pronunciation, e.g. chef (vs. chief), pâté (vs. paste), fête (vs. feast). There are multiple doublets caused by the w → g and ca → cha sound changes, which happened in standard French but not Norman French. Several of these examples also reflect changes that occurred after Old French which caused the possible environments of [s] to be greatly reduced.

English words from French
from Norman French	from standard Old or Modern French
car	chariot
castle	chateau
catch	chase
cattle	chattel
convey	convoy
paste	pâté
feast	fête
hostel	hotel
pocket	pouch
reward	regard
wallop	gallop (also galop, a type of dance)
warden	guardian
wardrobe	garderobe
warranty	guarantee
wile, wily	guile

=== Chinese ===
Derivative cognates are a classification of Chinese characters which have similar meanings and often the same etymological root, but which have diverged in pronunciation and meaning. An example is the doublet 考 and 老. At one time they were pronounced similarly and meant "old (person)". 老 (/lɑʊ̯˨˩˦/ in Standard Mandarin) has retained this meaning, but 考 /kʰɑʊ̯˨˩˦/ now mainly means "examine".

Differing literary and colloquial readings of certain Chinese characters are common doublets in many Chinese varieties, and the reading distinctions for certain phonetic features often typify a dialect group. For a given Chinese variety, colloquial readings typically reflect native vernacular phonology. Literary readings are used in some formal settings (recitation, some loanwords and names) and originate from other, typically more prestigious varieties. Sometimes literary and colloquial readings of the same character have different meanings. For example, in Cantonese, the character 平 can have the colloquial pronunciation /pʰɛŋ˨˩/ ("inexpensive"), and the literary pronunciation /pʰɪŋ˨˩/ ("flat").

=== Irish ===
The words píosa and cuid (both meaning "part" or "portion") form an Irish doublet, both from the Proto-Celtic root *kʷesdis. This root became in Gaulish pettyā, then was borrowed into Late Latin as pettia, Anglo-Norman piece, then Middle English pece, before being borrowed into Middle Irish as pissa, which became modern píosa. In Old Irish, *kʷesdis became cuit, which in modern Irish is cuid.

=== Italian ===
- macina (mill), macchina (machine): come from Latin machina
- soldo, solido and sodo come from Latin solidus
- sego (animal fat in slaughtered animals) and the medical term sebo (substance produced by skin) come from Latin sebum
- duca (duke), doge (chief of Italian state), duce (borrowing from Latin) come from Latin ducem.
- colpo and golfo come from Greek kolpos through Latin.
- ciao, schiavo and slavo, sloveno and slovacco come from Greek sklavos
- bestia (beast, borrowed from Latin) and biscia (grass snake) come from Latin bestia
- clan (through Irish and English) and pianta (plant). The words ultimately come from Latin planta.
- esame, Latin borrowing meaning exam, and sciame, native stock word meaning swarm, both come from Latin examen
- prezzo (price) and pregio (quality) come from praetium
- causa (cause) and cosa (thing) both come from Latin causa. Italian causa is a learnt borrowing from Latin, while the Italian word cosa is inherited from vulgar Latin.
- sport and deportare. Sport is an English borrowing for 'physical activity' while deportare has the same English meaning of "to deport", that is evicting someone from a country. Both sport and deportare come ultimately from Latin dēportō

=== New Indo-Aryan ===
In Hindi and other New Indo-Aryan languages, members of native doublets are identified as either tadbhava ('became that'), which is ultimately derived from Sanskrit but underwent changes through time, or tatsama ('same as that'), which is borrowed directly from literary Sanskrit. For example, Hindi bāgh 'tiger' is derived by historical stages (tadbhava) from Sanskrit vyāghra 'tiger'. Meanwhile, Hindi has also directly borrowed (tatsama) the Sanskrit word vyāghra, meaning 'tiger' in a more literary register.

Several doublets in Hindustani, which has two standard forms of Hindi and Urdu, come from common Proto-Indo-Iranian roots, with one descending via Sanskrit and another via Persian. These may have stayed synonyms or diverged into different meanings. One example where both patterns can be seen is from the Sanskrit vār (water) and Persian bârân (rain), both from Proto-Indo-Iranian wáHr̥. The Hindustani words for rain include varṣā and barsāt from Sanskrit as well as bāriś from Persian. Meanwhile, the word varṣ from the same root has come to mean year, though often the Persian word sāl is used instead. This word is also a doublet, in this case of the Sanskrit word śarad, which has come to mean the season fall in Hindi.

=== Polish ===
Triplets:

- upiór, wąpierz, wampir 'vampire' (see the etymology of wampir)
- szczać 'piss' (vulgar), sikać 'spout' (informal), siusiać 'pee' (childish, euphemism; the latter is possibly an irregular diminutive of the former)
- magister, majster, mistrz: from German Meister, Dutch meester, and Latin magister; cognate to Italian maestro, English master, mister

=== Spanish ===
As with many languages in Europe, a great deal of borrowing from written Latin – latinismos (Latinisms), or cultismos (learned words) – occurred during the Renaissance and the early modern era. Because Spanish is itself a Romance language already with many native words of Latin ancestry (transmitted orally, so with natural sound changes), the later written borrowing created a number of doublets. Adding to this was Spain's conquest by the Moors in the Middle Ages, leading to another vector for creating doublets (Latin to Arabic to Spanish).

Native stock (palabras patrimoniales)	Latinisms (cultismos)	Latin etyma
bicho 'bug'	bestia 'beast'	bēstia
llave 'key' (object)	clave 'key' (concept)	clāvis
raudo 'swift-moving'	rápido 'rapid'	rapidus
dinero 'money'	denario 'denarius coin'	dēnārius
caldo 'broth'	cálido 'related to hot'	calidus
sueldo 'salary'	sólido 'solid'	solidus
delgado 'skinny'	delicado 'delicate'	dēlicātus
vaina 'pod'	vagina 'vagina'	vāgīna

=== Welsh ===
List of doublets in Welsh

Welsh contains many doublets of native origin, where a single Indo-European root has developed along different paths in the language. Examples of this are:

- berw "boiled, boiling" and brwd "enthusiastic" from Proto-Indo-European *bʰrewh- "to boil, brew"
- gwely "bed" and lle "place" from Proto-Indo-European *legʰ- "to lie (down)"
- gwanwyn "spring", gwawr "dawn" and gwennol "swallow (bird)" from Proto-Indo-European *wósr̥- "spring"
- anadl "breath" and enaid "soul" from Proto-Indo-European *h₂enh₁- "to breathe"
- medd "mead" and meddw "drunk" from Proto-Indo-European *médʰu- "honey, mead"

In addition to native doublets, Welsh has borrowed extensively over the centuries, particularly from Latin and English. This has led to many more doublets in the language, including many from Latin that entered Welsh via English borrowings. Examples include:

- Duw "God", dydd "day" (both native), Iau "Thursday" (Latin) and siwrnai "journey" (Latin via French via English) from Proto-Indo-European *dyew- "to be bright; sky, heaven"
- iau "yoke (pulling frame)" (native) and ioga "yoga" (Sanskrit via English) from Proto-Indo-European *yewg- "to join, to tie together"
- rhydd "free" (native), ffrae "argument" (Germanic via Latin and French via English) and ffrind "friend" (English) from Proto-Indo-European *preyH- "to love, please"
- Alban "Scotland" (Irish) and Alpau "Alps" (Latin via English) from Proto-Indo-European *albʰós "white"
- nodwydd "needle", nyddu "to spin" (both native), nerf "nerve" (Latin via English) and newro- "neuro-" (Greek via English) from Proto-Indo-European *(s)neh₁ "to spin, sew"

== See also ==
- Reborrowing
- Cognate, specifically, those within the same language
- False friends that may develop in the same way
