= List of German words of French origin =

This is a list of German words and expressions of French origin. Some of them were borrowed in medieval times, some were introduced by Huguenot immigrants in the 17th and 18th centuries and others have been borrowed in the 19th and 20th centuries. German Wiktionary lists about 120,000 German words without declensions and conjugations. Of these, more than 2300 words (about 2%) are categorized as German terms derived from French.

== A ==
- à la carte
- Abenteuer (adventure), from Middle High German āventiure, borrowed from Old French aventure
- Abonnement (subscription)
- abonnieren (to subscribe)
- Accessoire (accessory)
- ade (bye), from Old French adé
- adieu
- Admiral (admiral)
- Adresse (address)
- adressieren (to address), from French adresser
- adrett (neat), from French adroit
- Affäre (affair), borrowing from French affaire
- Affront (affront)
- Akkord (music chord, piecework), from French accord
- akkreditieren (to accredit), from French accréditer
- Akquise (acquisition), from French acquise
- Akrobat (acrobat)
- Akrobatik (acrobatics)
- Akteur (protagonist), from French acteur
- Aktionär (shareholder), from French actionnaire
- aktuell (current, up to date, updated, live, recent), from French actuel
- Allee (alley), from French allée
- Allianz (alliance), from French alliance
- Allüre (affectation), from French allure
- Altruismus (altruism), from French altruisme
- Amateur (amateur)
- Ambition (ambition)
- amourös (amorous), from French amoureux
- amüsant (amusing), from French amusant
- amüsieren (to amuse), from French amuser
- Anarchie (anarchy), from Ancient Greek ἀναρχία (anarkhía) via Latin and French
- Anarchist (anarchist), from French anarchiste
- Anekdote (anecdote), from French anecdote
- animieren (to encourage), from French animer
- Annexion (annexation), from French annexion
- annektieren (to annex), from French annexer
- Annonce (classified ad), from French annonce
- apart (fancy, distinctive), from French à part
- Aperitif (apéritif)
- Appartement, Apartment (suite in a hotel), from French appartement
- apropos (apropos), from French à propos
- Arrangement (arrangement)
- arrangieren (to arrange), from French arranger
- arriviert (successful), from French arriver
- Armee (military, army), from French armée.
- arrogant (arrogant)
- Artillerie (artillery)
- Artist (acrobat), from French artiste
- Asphalt (asphalt), from French asphalte
- Aspik (aspic)
- Atelier (artist's or photographer's studio)
- Attaché (attaché)
- Attacke (attack), from French attaque
- attackieren (to attack), from French attaquer
- Attentat (assassination)
- Attitüde (attitude)
- Attrappe (dummy, mockup)
- Aubergine (eggplant)
- Au-pair (au pair)
- Avance
- avancieren (to advance), from French avancer
- Avantgarde (avant-garde)
- Aversion (aversion)

== B ==
- Bagage (baggage; clan, gang)
- Bagatelle
- bagatellisieren
- Baguette
- Baiser
- Baisse
- Bajonett (bayonet)
- Balance
- Balkon (balcony)
- Ballade
- Ballon
- banal
- banalisieren
- Banalität
- Bandage
- Bande
- Bankett
- Bankier
- Baracke
- Barriere
- Barrikade
- Bassin
- Bataillon
- Batterie
- Béchamelsauce
- beige
- Belletristik
- Beton
- bigott
- Bigotterie
- Billiard
- Billet
- Biskuit
- Bistro
- Biwak
- bizarr
- Blamage
- blamieren
- blanchieren
- Blessur
- blümerant
- Bluse
- Bohème
- Bombardment
- bombardieren
- Bombe
- Bonbon
- Bonmot
- Bordell
- Bouillabaisse
- Bouillon
- Boule
- Boulevard
- Bourgeoisie
- Boutique
- Branche
- Bravour
- bravourös
- Bredouille
- Brigade
- Brikett
- brilliant
- Brillanz
- Brimborium
- brisant
- Brise
- Bronze
- Brosche
- Broschüre
- brünett
- brüsk
- brüskieren
- Budget
- Buffet
- Bulette
- Bulletin
- burlesk
- Büro
- Bürokrat
- Büste

== C ==
- Cabriolet
- Café
- Camembert
- Canapé
- Chalet
- Champagner
- Champignon
- Chance
- changieren
- Chanson
- Charakter
- Charge
- Charme
- charmant
- Charmeur
- Chauffeur
- Chaussee
- Chauvinismus
- Chauvinist
- Chef
- Chicorée
- Chiffre
- chiffrieren
- Chose
- Cidre
- Claqueur
- Clementine
- Clique
- Clochard
- Clou
- Cognac
- Collage
- Collier
- Confiserie
- Consommé
- Contenance
- Cordon bleu
- Cornichon
- Couch
- Couleur
- Coup
- Coupé
- Coupon
- Courage
- Cousin
- Cousine
- Creme
- Crème de la Crème
- Crème fraiche
- Crepe
- Croissant
- Croupier
- Crouton
- Cuvée

== D ==
- Dame
- Debakel
- Debatte
- debattieren
- Debüt
- Debütant
- debütieren
- dechiffrieren
- Defensive
- defilieren
- Defizit
- defizitär
- Déjà-vu
- dekadent
- Dekadenz
- deklassieren
- Deko
- Dekolleté
- Dekoration
- dekorativ
- dekorieren
- Delegation
- delegieren
- delikat
- Delikatesse
- Dementi
- dementieren
- demolieren
- Demontage
- Dependence
- Depesche
- deplatziert
- Depot
- deportieren
- Depression
- depressiv
- Desaster
- desaströs
- desavouiren
- Deserteur
- Dessert
- Dessous
- Detail
- Devise
- dezent
- Diamant
- Digestif
- Dilettant
- dilettantisch
- Diner
- Diplomat
- Diplomatie
- diplomatisch
- Diskothek
- diskret
- Disput
- Distanz
- distanziert
- Dividende
- Division
- Domäne
- Dorade
- Dossier
- Double
- Dragee
- dressieren
- Dressur
- Droge
- Drogerie
- drollig
- Dusche
- duschen
- dutzend
- dynamisch

== E ==
- Eau de Cologne
- echauffieren
- Effet
- egal
- egalisieren
- egalitär
- Eklat
- eklatant
- Elan
- elegant
- Elite
- elitär
- Emaille
- Emblem
- Emotion
- en bloc
- Enfant terrible
- Engagement
- engagieren
- Enklave
- en masse
- enorm
- Ensemble
- Entrecôte
- Entree
- en vogue
- Episode
- Eskapade
- Eskorte
- eskortieren
- Esprit
- essenziell
- etablieren
- Etablissement
- Etage
- Etappe
- Etat
- etepetete
- Etikett
- Etikette
- Etui
- Experte
- Expertise
- Exposé, Exposee
- extravagant
- exzellent

== F ==
- Fabrik
- Facette
- Faible
- Fassade
- Fauxpas
- Fee
- fein
- Fenster
- Feuilleton
- Fiaker
- Figur
- Filet
- finanzieren
- Finesse
- Flair
- flambieren
- Flanell
- Flöte
- Florett
- Fond
- Fonds
- Fondue
- Fontäne
- forcieren
- Foyer
- frappieren
- fraternisieren
- frau
- Frikadelle
- Frikassee
- Friseur
- Fritteuse
- frittieren
- frivol
- Front

== G ==
- Gage
- galant
- Garage
- Garantie
- garantieren
- Garde
- Garderobe
- garnieren
- Garnison
- Garnitur
- Gelatine
- Gelee
- genant
- General
- generös
- genial
- Genie
- genieren
- Genre
- Gepard
- Giraffe
- Girlande
- Gletscher
- Gourmet
- Gratin
- gratinieren
- Grippe
- grotesk
- Gruppe

== H ==
- Hangar
- Hasardeur
- Hausse
- Haute Couture
- Haute Cuisine
- Hautgout
- Hommage
- Hotel

== I ==
- Ingenieur
- Idee
- Illusion
- illustrieren
- imaginär
- imposant
- invalide
- imponieren
- Infanterie
- Infekt
- Initiative
- Insolvenz
- Interieur
- interessant
- Intervention
- Invasion

== J ==
- Jalousie
- Jargon
- jonglieren
- Journal
- Journalist
- Jury

== K ==
- Kabarett
- Kabinett
- Kadett
- Kampagne
- Kanapee
- Kapitän
- Karaffe
- Karambolage
- Karosse
- Karosserie
- Karree
- Karriere
- Karussell
- Kaserne
- kaschieren
- Kavalier
- Kavallerie
- Kinkerlitzchen
- Kino
- Kiosk
- Klavier
- Klischee
- Kokon
- Kolibri
- Kolonnade
- Kolonne
- Kollaborateur
- Kolportage
- Kommandeur
- Kommode
- Kommuniqué
- Kompagnon
- Komparse
- komplett
- Kompliment
- Konfitüre
- Kontrolleur
- Kontur
- konvertieren
- Konvoi
- Korps
- Kostüm
- Kotelett
- Koteletten
- Krawatte
- Kreation
- kriminell
- Kritik
- Kurier
- Kurs
- Kuvert
- Kuvertüre

== L ==
- Laissez-faire
- Lamelle
- Lampe
- Lampion
- lancieren
- Lanze
- larmoyant
- leger
- Leutnant
- Liaison
- Likör
- Limette
- Limonade
- Limousine
- Livree
- Loge
- logieren
- Longe
- longieren
- loyal

== M ==
- Major
- makaber
- Malheur
- Mandarine
- Manege
- Manöver
- Mannequin
- Margarine
- Marge
- Marinade
- Marine
- marinieren
- Marionette
- marode
- Marodeur
- Marone
- Marotte
- Marsch
- marschieren
- Maskottchen
- Massage
- Massaker
- Masseur
- massieren
- Matinee
- Mayonnaise
- Medaille
- Melange
- Melasse
- Memoiren
- Menü
- Meute
- Miene
- Milieu
- Militär
- Milliarde
- Mine
- Minister
- miserabel
- Möbel
- Mode
- Montage
- Monteur
- Mousse au Chocolat
- Munition

== N ==
- Naturell
- Necessaire
- Négligée
- nervös
- Nippes
- Niveau
- nobel
- Noblesse
- Nocturne
- Nuance
- Nougat
- nonchalant

== O ==
- Oboe
- Odor
- Œuvre
- Offensive
- Offerte
- offiziell
- Offizier
- opportun
- Opportunismus
- Omelett
- Onkel
- Omnibus
- Orange
- Orangerie
- ordinär
- Orchideen
- Ouvertüre

== P ==
- Page
- Paket
- Paladin
- Palaver
- palavern
- Palais
- Palette
- Palisade
- Pampelmuse
- Panade
- panaschieren
- panieren
- Pantomime
- Panzer (from Middle French pansier)
- Paraplü
- Parasol
- Paravent
- Parcours
- Parfum, Parfüm
- Parlament
- Parodie
- Partei
- Parterre
- Parvenü
- Passage
- Passagier
- passé
- passieren
- Passion
- pasteurisieren
- Patissier
- Patrouille
- Pavillon
- Pazifismus
- Pazifist
- Pendant
- Pension
- perfide
- Persiflage
- Perücke
- peu à peu
- Pike
- Pilot
- Pinzette
- Pirouette
- Pissoir
- Plädoyer
- Plagiat
- Plakette
- Plan
- Plantage
- Plateau
- platt
- Plattform
- Plattitüde
- Plombe
- Plüsch
- Pöbel
- pochieren
- Poesie
- Pointe
- Polemik
- Polonaise
- Pommes Frites
- Ponton
- populär
- Porree
- Portier
- Portemonnaie
- Portrait
- Pose
- Potpourri
- Praline
- Präsentation
- Präsident
- Präservativ
- präzise
- Präzision
- professionell
- profitieren
- Projektil
- Promenade
- proper
- Puder
- Püree

== Q ==
- Qualifikation
- Quarantäne
- Quartier
- Querelen
- Queue
- Quiche

== R ==
- Raclette
- Rage
- Ragout
- rangieren
- rasieren
- Ratatouille
- Recherche
- recherchieren
- Redakteur
- Redaktion
- Referenz
- Refrain
- Regie
- Regime
- Regisseur
- Reklame
- Rekrut
- rekrutieren
- Relais
- Relief
- Remoulade
- Remis
- Remise
- Renaissance
- Rendezvous
- Renommee
- Repertoire
- Reportage
- Requisite
- Reserve
- Reservoir
- Restaurant
- Ressentiment
- Ressort
- Ressource
- Resolution
- Resultat
- Resümee
- resümieren
- Retusche
- retuschieren
- Revanche
- Revolte
- revoltieren
- Revolution
- Revue
- riskant
- Rivale
- Robe
- Rochade
- rochieren
- Roman
- Rommé
- Rondell
- Rosine
- Rouge
- Roulade
- Rouleau, Rollo
- Roulette
- Route
- Routine
- routiniert
- Ruine

== S ==
- Sabotage
- Saboteur
- Saison
- Salär
- Salon
- salopp
- Sanktion
- Satin
- Sauce
- Schalotte
- Scharade
- schick
- Schikane
- schikanieren
- Schock
- schwadronieren
- Sekretär
- Sensation
- sensibel
- sentimental
- servieren
- Serviette
- Service
- Signal
- Signet
- Silhouette
- Soiree
- Solidarität
- solide
- Sorbet
- Souffleur
- Souterrain
- Souvenir
- souverän
- Spezialist
- speziell
- Spionage
- Staffage
- Stiefel
- süffisant
- Suggestion
- suggestiv
- Suite
- Sujet
- Szene
- Szenerie

== T ==
- Tableau
- Tablett
- Tablette
- Taille
- Tante
- Taxi
- Teint
- Terrain
- Terrasse
- Terrine
- Terror
- Terrorist
- Tête-à-Tête
- Textil
- Thermometer
- Timbre
- Tirade
- Toilette
- Tonnage
- touchieren
- Tour
- Tournee
- Tournier
- Trance
- Tranche
- Tresor
- Tribüne
- Trikot
- trist
- Tristesse
- Trottoir
- Troubadour
- Trubel
- Truppe
- Turbine
- türkis
- Tusche

== U ==
- Utopie

== V ==
- Vagabund
- vage
- Variante
- Variation
- Varieté
- Vase
- Vaseline
- Vernissage
- Version
- Vers
- Verve
- vif
- Vignette
- Vinaigrette
- virtuell
- violett
- vis-a-vis
- Visage
- Visitation
- Visite
- vital
- voilà
- Voliere
- voltigieren
- Voyeur

== W ==
- Wagon
- Weste

== Z ==
- Zigarette
- zirkulär
- zivil
- Zivilisation

== See also ==
- List of English words of French origin
- List of Spanish words of French origin
- List of French words of Germanic origin
- Loanword
