= Latinism =

Word that is derived from, or suggestive of, the Latin language

This map shows the countries in the world that use a Latin script. Latin script is the sole official (or de facto official) national script. Latin script is a co-official script at the national level. Latin script is not officially used.

A Latinism (from Medieval Latin: Latinismus) is a word, idiom, or structure in a language other than Latin that is derived from, or suggestive of, the Latin language. The Term Latinism refers to those loan words that are borrowed into another language directly from Latin (especially frequent among inkhorn terms); English has many of these, as well. There are many Latinisms in English, and other (especially European) languages.

== Lexical Latinism ==
On the basic level of particular words and lexemes, creation and adoption of Latinisms has a long history, dating back to the ancient times. Early lexical Latinisms are attested in various languages that came into contact with Latin language during the expansion of ancient Roman culture. The same process continued during the Middle Ages, and acquired new forms in modern times under the influence of scientific terminology, largely based on the Scientific Latin. As a particular subgroup of lexical Latinisms, various onomastic Latinisms are formed through Latinisation of proper names, including personal names and toponyms.

== Syntactical Latinism ==
Renewed interest in Classical Latin literature during the Renaissance period resulted in the emergence of various forms of syntactical Latinisms, manifested by a tendency of renaissance and later authors to shape the syntax of their sentences according to rhetorical style used by Classical Latin authors, like Cicero and Caesar.

== Idiomatic Latinism ==
Idiomatic Latinisms are phrases or idioms that are adopted from Latin language, or modeled according to Latin phraseology.

== See also ==
- Dog Latin
- Latin influence in English
- Latin tag
- List of Latin abbreviations
- List of Latin legal terms
- List of Latin phrases
- Neo-Latin
- Pan-Latinism
- Romanism
- Vulgar Latin
