= List of English words with dual French and Old English variations =

Following the Norman Conquest of 1066, England came under the rule of Norman-speaking peoples. While Old French became the language of high culture and government, the vast majority of the population continued to use Old English. Over time, the English language was increasingly influenced by French, particularly in its vocabulary and to a much lesser extent in its grammar. While in some cases Old English words have been displaced by words from French (as for instance "ġeolurēad" displaced by "orange"), in many cases the two (or more) words have coexisted, each with a different meaning, or as near-synonyms, or else as true synomyms but with a nuance.

Words of French origin often refer to more abstract or generalized concepts than their Old English equivalents; compare for instance "liberty" and "freedom". Because they were words used by the elite, words coming from French often retain a higher register than words of Old English origin. There are exceptions though; as for instance "weep", "broom" and "stone" (from Old English) which occupy a slightly higher register than "cry", "brush" and "rock" (from French).

Because they are often more elaborate or abstract than words from Old English, words from French tend to be less frequently used in everyday language, but there are exceptions too; as for instance "people" (from Old French) which is of much more frequent use than "folk" (from Old English).

== Foods ==
Walter Scott popularized the idea of the Anglo-Norman nobility eating the meats of the animals that Anglo-Saxon peasants had raised: beef/cow, mutton/sheep, veal/calf and pork/pig. In each case the word of French origin was only used in the kitchen. In fact this occurred centuries after the Norman conquest (a modern example being escargot/snail) and might owe more to the enduring prestige of French cuisine than to a hypothetical specialization of tasks.

Old English origin words	Old French origin words	Notes
cow (OE cū) ox (OE oxa)	beef (AN beof; OF boef)	
calf (OE ċealf)	veal (AN vel; OF veel, veal)	
swine (OE swīn) pig (OE picga)	pork (OF porc)	
sheep (OE sċēap)	mutton (OF moton)	
hen (OE hen, henn) chicken (OE ċicen)	poultry (OF pouletrie) pullet (OF poulet)	
deer (OE dēor) hart (OE heorot)	venison (AN venesoun)	
dove (OE dūfe)	pigeon (OF pijən)	

== Other words ==
Most words of French origin are from Latin, but some are from Gaulish (a Celtic language), Old Frankish (a Germanic language) or other sources. Conversely, Old English borrowed some words from Latin. This list is therefore distinct from the list of Germanic and Latinate equivalents.

Some words were borrowed directly from Old French, others were borrowed later, from Middle French or Modern French.

Some of the words in the list below might now be obsolete, archaic or dialectal.

French origin words	Old English origin words	Notes
to abandon	to forsake	
accustomed	wont	
action, feat	deed	
adolescence	teenhood	
advantage	behoof	
age	eld	"Eld" survives in "elder" and "elderly".
aid, abet, assist	help, bestand, bestead	
allegiance	troth	
amicable	friendly	
amorous	lovesome	
amount	deal	
amour	love	While obsolete in the sense of "love" itself, "amour" can still refer to courtship, flirtation, a love affair or a lover.
ancestor	forebear, forefather	
ancient	old	
angel	errand-ghost	Puristic.
animal, beast	deer, rother	Obsolete in the general sense of "animal".
annual	yearly	
appoint	aset	
arm	weapon	
around	umbe	Now mostly dialectal.
arrive	come	
artisan	craftsman	
assemble	gather	
assume	foreguess	
astonish	amaze, stun	
asylum, sanctuary	grith	Archaic or historical.
attach	fasten, bind	
attack, assault	onfall, onrush	
attention	heed	
attitude, posture	bearing	
attorney, barrister, solicitor	lawyer	
audacity	daring, boldness	
aunt	modrige	Obsolete.
autumn	fall, harvest	
barber	cutbeard	Obsolete.
baron	thane	Historical.
beautiful	sheen, lovely, fair	
belligerent	warmongering	
beverage, imbibe	drink (noun + verb)	
blank	white	
blond, blonde	fair, fair-haired	
boil	seethe, plaw	
bottle, flacon	flask	
bounty	goodness	
boutique	shop	
broil	burn	
brush	broom	
cabbage	cole, kale	
cache	hoard	
calmness, tranquility	roo	Dialectal; otherwise obsolete.
candle	glim	"Glim" was an 18th century back-formation from "glimmer", and does not predate "candle".
canine	doglike	
carnage, massacre	bloodbath, bloodshed	
carpentry	woodwork	
carry	bring, bear	
catch, seize	snatch, grasp	
cavalier	horseman	The word from French has largely fallen out of use.
cemetery	graveyard	
chair	stool, settle (noun)	
chamber	room	
chase	hunt	
chef	cook (noun)	
chevalier	knight	The word from French has largely fallen out of use.
chief, ruler	drighten	Historical, puristic, fantasy or neopaganism.
city	borough	
colour	hue, blee	
combat	fight	
command	behest, bidding	
commence	start, begin	
commerce	trade	
complain	norn	
comply, obey, observe	abide, acknowledge	
comprehend	understand	
conceive	think	
conclusion	endsay	Puristic; otherwise obsolete.
concubine	chevese	Obsolete.
consider, judge	deem	
construction	building	
continue	carry on	
contract, pledge	handfast	
cordial	hearty	
corporal	bodily	
corpse	lich	Archaic or fantasy.
correspond	match	
count	earl	In a British context, "earl" is preferred to "count", but the feminine form is "countess", as "earless" does not look good.
country	land	
couturier	clothesmaker	
covert	hidden	
creature	wight	Archaic or fantasy.
crescent	waxing	
crime	firen	Obsolete.
cry	weep, sob	
culpable	guilty	
dame	lady	
decapitate	behead	
decay, putrefy	rot	
declare	quethe	Obsolete.
decline, demise	downfall	
deliberate	wilful	
demi-	half-	
departure	forthfare	Obsolete.
depart	leave	
desire (verb and noun)	wish, will, yearning, longing, want (verb)	
despair	hopelessness	
destiny	wyrd, orlay	Historical, otherwise neopaganism.
detain	forhold	
dictionary	wordbook	
difficile	stubborn	
difficult	tough	
disease, affliction, malady	illness, sickness, ailment	
disengage	withdraw	
disperse	scatter	
distance	span	
divine	godly	
divinity	godhood	
donjon	keep (noun)	
double	twin	
easy, facile	eath	Now mostly dialectal.
embroidery	needlework	
employment	job	
encounter	meet	
enemy	foe	
engender	beget	
enquire	ask, beseech	
ensue	follow	
enterprise	undertaking	
equinox	evennight	Historical or neopaganism.
error	mistake	
to escape	to flee	
eternal	everlasting	
exchange	swap	
expedition	ferd	Obsolete or dialectal.
extraterrestrial	outworlder	Puristic.
faith	belief	
famine	drought, dearth	
fatigue	tire	
fault	shild	Obsolete.
faux pas	misstep, blunder	
favourite	darling	
feasible	doable	
feeble, faint	weak	
feline	catlike	
feminine	womanly	
finish	end	
flame	fire	
flexible, pliable	bendsome, lithy	Archaic or puristic.
flower	blossom	
folly	madness	
force	strength	
forest	woodland, woods	
form	shape	
fort, fortress	stronghold	
frail, fragile	brittle	
fraternal	brotherly	
fume	smoke	
garden	yard	
garment	clothes	
gentle	lithe	
giant	ettin	Archaic, dialectal or fantasy.
gorge	throat	
grange	barn	
grief	sorrow	
gullet	weasand	
honest, frank	outspoken, straightforward	
honour	mensk	Obsolete.
horrible	awful	
hour	stound	Obsolete, archaic or dialectal.
hydrogen	waterstuff	Calque of a German translation of the French term.
ideas	thoughts	
identity	selfhood	
illegal	unlawful	
incredible	awesome, unbelievable	
indulgent	forgiving	
innocent	bilewit	Obsolete.
insect	bug	
instrument	tool	
intrepid	reckless	
invisible	unseeable	
irate	angry, wrathful	
ire, rage	anger, wrath	
isle	island	
journey	wayfare	
justice	fairness	
labour	work	
to lament, to regret	to rue	
language	atheed	Puristic.
letter	bookstaff, bookstave	Archaic or puristic.
liberty	freedom	
liege	lord	
literature	bookcraft	Archaic or puristic.
lizard	ask	Obsolete or dialectal.
loyal	faithful	
magic	dwimmer	Archaic or neopaganism.
maintain	uphold	
manner	behaviour	
mansion	house	
manual	handbook	
march	walk	
mariner	sailor	
marriage	wedlock	
marry	wed	
marvel	wonder	
masculine, virile	manly	
mason	bricklayer	
maternal	motherly	
matrice	womb	"Matrice" in the sense of "womb" is obsolete in both English and French.
menace	threat	
merchant	trader	
meridional	southern	
migraine	headache	
monarchy	kingship	
mortal, fatal	deadly, deathly	
mountain	barrow	Rather than becoming obsolete, "barrow" came to refer to a burial mound rather than a mountain, see tumulus.
muscle	thew	
mutilate	maim	
native	inborn	
nativity	birth	
noble	athel	Historical.
noise	clattering	
noon	midday	
nostalgia	homesickness	
nuance	shade	
number	rime	Archaic or dialectal.
nurture	upbringing	
observe	watch	
occidental	western	
odour	smell, stench	
omnipotent	almighty	
oppressed	downtrodden	
oriental	eastern	
overture	opening	
oxygen	sourstuff	Calque of a German translation of the French term.
pain	bread	As "a kind of pie with a soft crust", "pain" from Old French is obsolete but has been borrowed again from French in words like pain au chocolat and pain aux raisins.
pain	ache	
pants	hosen, britches	
paradise	heaven	
pardon	forgive	
paternal	fatherly	
patience	forbearance	
peace	frith	Archaic or poetic.
people	folk, lede (leod)	In modern English, "lede" is only found as a conscious archaism.
penchant	leaning	
pendant	hanging	
pensive	thinking, mindful	
perfect	flawless	
permission	leave	
phantom, spirit	ghost	
physician	leech	The meaning of the small bloodsucking creature coexisted with the meaning of physician. The former is still in use today.
pillage	harry	
pity, mercy	ruth	Usage persists to a greater degree in "ruthless" and to a lesser degree "ruthful".
planet	wanderstar	Science-fiction, fantasy.
plant	wort	Survives in the names of certain plants and fungi.
plume	feather	
point	ord	Dialectal.
ponder	wonder	
poor	arm, wantsome	
port	harbour, haven	
poverty	armth	Obsolete.
predict	foretell	
preface	forespeech	
preference	forechoice	
presage	foreshadow	
present	gift	
preview	forelook	
previous	erstwhile	
prime	first	
prince	atheling, drighten	Historical.
progeny	offspring	
progress	forthgang	
prohibit	forbid, ban	
promise, pledge	oath	
property	owndom, belongings	
proposal	betrothal	
prudence, sagacity	wisdom	
purchase	buy	
quay	wharf	
rapid	quick, fast	
rare, scarce	geason, selcouth	
ray	beam	
reality	sooth	Archaic.
realm	kingdom	
reason, cause	sake, ground	
rebuke	scold	
receive	withtake	
regretful	rueful	
relief	liss	Obsolete; otherwise dialectal.
reluctant	unwilling, loath	
remorseless	ruthless	
rent	gavel	Historical.
reply, response	answer	
requirements	needs	
reservoir	tank	
reside	live, abide, dwell	
residence, domicile	woning	Archaic.
to resist	to withstand	
revenue	income	
reverie	daydream	
ridiculous	laughable	
rob	reave	Today found mostly in "reaver", meaning robber or highwayman.
rock	stone	
roy	king	As a noun, "roy" has become obsolete but subsists in "viceroy" and "royal".
royal	kingly	
rude	uncouth	
rumour	hearsay	
rural	landly	
saint, sacred	holy, hallowed	
salutary, salubrious	wholesome, healthy, healthful	
sanguinary	bloodthirsty	
savage	wild	
science	knowledge	
season	yeartide	Yuletide
sentiment	feeling	
serf, captive	thrall	Historical; otherwise puristic or literary.
serious	earnest	
serpent	snake	
sever	sunder	
severe	stern	
signification	meaning	
sir, sire	lord	
sole	only, alone	
solstice	sunstead	Puristic.
sombre, obscure	dark, shadowy	
somersault	tumble	
sorcerer	wizard	
sorceress	witch	
sororal	sisterly	
source	spring	
spleen	milt	
spoil	mar	
squirrel	acquerne	Obsolete.
stomach	belly	
strange	weird, fremd	
suffocate	smother	
support	uphold, undergird, upstay	
surmount	overcome	
surprise	overtake	
surrender	overgive	
surround	beset	
survive	overlive	
table	board	
tavern	inn	
tendon	sinew	
terrestrial	earthly	
terrify	frighten	
throne	seld	Obsolete.
timid	shy	
tomb	grave	
totally, entirely	wholly, fully	
treasure	goldhoard	Historical; otherwise puristic.
uncle	eam	Obsolete; otherwise dialectal.
use, utility	note	
valet, butler	footman	
valuable	worthy	
vein, artery	edder	
vend	sell	
venom, poison	atter	Archaic; otherwise dialectal.
verdant	green	
victory	win (noun)	
village, hamlet	thorp	Survives in many place names, such as Scunthorpe in Lincolnshire, England, or Burnham Thorpe in Norfolk, England.
viper	adder	
virginity	maidenhood	
vision	sight	
voice	steven, reard	Obsolete; otherwise dialectal.
wages	earnings	
zero	nought	

== See also ==
- Lists of English loanwords by country or language of origin
- List of English words of French origin
- Changes to Old English vocabulary
- List of Germanic and Latinate equivalents in English
- Linguistic purism in English
