= List of English Latinates of Germanic origin =

Many words in the English lexicon are made up of Latinate words; that is, words which have entered the English language from a Romance language (usually Anglo-Norman), or were borrowed directly from Latin. Quite a few of these words can further trace their origins back to a Germanic source (usually Frankish), making them cognate with many native English words from Old English, yielding etymological twins. Many of these are Franco-German words, or French words of Germanic origin.

Below is a list of Germanic words, names and affixes which have come into English via Latin or a Romance language.

== A ==
- aband
- abandominium
- abandon
- abandonment
- abannation
- abannition
- abate (disputed)
- abet
- abettal
- abettor
- abut
- abutment
- affray
- afraid
- allegiance
- allodial
- allodium
- allot
- allotment
- allure
- ambassador
- ambuscade
- ambush
- amuse
- amusement
- arrange
- arrangement
- array
- attach
- attachment
- attack
- attire
- auberge
- award

== B ==
- babillard
- baboon
- bacon
- badge
- baggage
- balcony
- baldric
- bale
- ballon
- balloon
- ballot
- ballottement
- banal
- banality
- band "flat strip"
- band "group"
- bandage
- bandeau
- bandit
- bandolier
- bandy
- banish
- bank "financial institution"
- bankrupt
- bankruptcy
- bannimus
- banlieue
- banner
- banquet
- banquette
- bargain
- baron
- baroness
- baronet
- barrel
- barren
- bastard
- bastardize
- baste
- bastide
- bastion
- bateau (also batteau)
- batter
- battery
- battle
- bawd
- bawdy
- beaker
- beggar
- beignet
- belfry
- berm
- bichon
- bigot
- bigotry
- bison
- bivouac
- blanch
- blancmange
- blank
- blanket
- blasé (also blase)
- blazon
- blemish
- bleu
- bliaut
- blister
- bloc
- block
- blockade
- blond
- blonde
- blouse
- bludgeon
- blue
- boast
- bobbin
- bocce
- bondage
- bonnet
- boot
- booty
- bordello
- border
- boss "button, bump"
- botany
- boudoir
- bouffant
- boulevard
- boulevardier
- bouquet
- bourgeois (also burgeois)
- bourgeoise
- bourgeoisie
- boutonniere
- brach
- brachet
- bracket
- braggart
- braise
- brandish
- brawn
- braze
- brazier
- bream
- breccia
- brick
- bridoon
- brioche
- briquette
- brisk
- brisket
- broil "to cook"
- broil "to quarrel"
- broker
- bronze (disputed)
- brose
- browse
- brulee
- brunet
- brunette
- brush "dust sweeper; hairbrush"
- brush "shrubbery, underbrush"
- brusque
- bucket
- buffer
- buffet "to strike"
- buffet "table"
- buffoon
- buoy
- buoyance
- buoyancy
- buoyant
- burette
- burgeon
- burgess
- burglar
- burglarize (also burglarise)
- burglary
- burin
- burnish
- busk
- butcher
- butt (of a joke)
- butt "to hit with the head"
- butte
- button
- buttress

== C ==
- cahoot (also cahoots)
- camerlengo
- camouflage
- canard
- cantankerous
- caroline
- carouse
- carousal
- carp (fish)
- carte blanche
- casserole
- chagrin
- chamberlain
- chamois
- charabanc
- charlotte
- chemise
- cheval de frise
- chic
- chicane
- chicanery
- chiffon
- chiffonade
- chiffonier
- choice
- claque
- cliche (also cliché)
- clique
- cloak
- cloche
- coach
- coat
- cockade
- cockaigne
- cocotte
- coif
- coiffeur
- coiffure
- cologne
- combat (disputed)
- condom
- contraband
- contraption
- coquette
- corvette
- coterie
- cotillion
- cottage
- cramp
- cranny
- crap
- cratch "creche"
- cravat
- crawfish
- crayfish
- creche
- creek
- cricket
- crochet
- croquet
- croquette
- crotch
- crouch
- croup
- crow (crowbar)
  - crowbar
- cruet
- crush
- cry (disputed)
- cuff

== D ==
- dance
- dart
- debate (disputed)
- debauch
  - debauchery
- deboshed
- debris (Etymonline raises Gaulish)
- debut
- debutante
- decry (disputed)
- deforestation (disputed)
- defray
- delay (in part)
- demarcation
- derange
- detach
- develop
- development
- disarray
- disband
- disease (in part)
- disenfranchise
- disengage
- disguise
- dislodge
- dismay
- drab
- drape
  - drapery
- droll
- drug
- dune
- dungeon

== E ==
- ease (in part)
- easy (in part)
- eclat (also éclat)
- egret
- elope
- embassy
- emblazon
- emblement
- emboss
- embrasure
- embroider
- embroil
- enamel
- encroach
- enfranchise
- engage
- engagement
- engrave
- engross
- enhance
- enrich
- entrap
- envelop
- envelope
- equerry
- equip
- equipment
- ermine
- escarpment
- eschew
- escrow
- espionage
- etiquette
- exfiltrate

== F ==
- falcon
- faubourg
- fee (partially)
- fellate
  - fellatio, fellation
- felon (disputed)
- felony (disputed)
- feoffer
- feud
- feudal
- feuter, fewter
- fiasco
- fie
- filbert
- filibuster
- filter
- flagon
- flamenco
- flamingo
- flan
- flâneur
- flange
- flank
- flask
- flatter
- fletcher
- flinch
- flock "tuft of wool"
- floss
- flotilla
- flotsam
- flounder (fish)
- forage
- foray
- forest (disputed)
  - forestation
  - forester
  - forestry
- forcené
- framboise
- franc
- franchise
- frank
- frankincense
- franklin
- frappe
- fray (feeling of alarm)
- fresco
- frisk
- frizz
- frock
- frounce
- fry (young fish)
- fur
- furbish
- furnish
- furniture

== G ==
- gabardine
- gable
- gadget
- gaffe
- gaiety
- gain
- gainstrive
- gaiter
- gala
- gallant
  - gallantry
- gallimaufry
- gallivant
- gallop
- garage
- garb
- garbage
- garçon
- garden
- gardenia
- garibaldi
- garland
- garment
- garner
- garnish
- garret
- garrison
- garrote
- gasket
- gauche
- gaudy
- gauge
- gaunt
- gauntlet
- gay
- ghetto
- gibbet
- gibbon
- giblets
- gigolo
- gimlet
- gleek (game of cards)
- gnocchi
- goblin
- gonfalon
- gopher
- goth
- gothic
- gourmand
- gourmet
- grape
- grapnel
- grappa
- grapple
- grate (verb)
- greaves
- grimace
- grippe
- grizzle
- grocer
  - grocery
- grommet
- gross
- grouch
- group
- growl
- grudge
- gruel
- guarantee
- guard
  - guardian
- guerdon
- guerrilla
- guidance
- guide
- guidon
- guile
- guimpe
- guise
- guy "rope"
- guy
- gyrfalcon

== H ==
- haggard
- haggis
- halberd
- hale "to drag, summon"
- halt "stop"
- halyard
- hamlet
- hamper "large basket"
- hanaper
- hangar
- harangue
- harass
- harassment
- harbinger
- hardy
- harlequin
- harlot
- harness
- harpoon
- harpsichord
- harridan
- hash
- haste
  - hasty
- hatch "to mark with lines"
- hatchet
- hauberk
- haughty
- haul
- haunch
- haunt
- haute cuisine
- hautboy
- hauteur
- havoc
- hawser
- heinous
- helmet
- herald
- heron
- hideous
- hobbledehoy
- hobby
- hockey
- hod
- hodgepodge
- hoe
- hollandaise
- huge
- hurt
- hurtle
- hut
- hutch

== I ==
- infiltrate
- install
- installment

== J ==
- jangle
- jape
- jersey
- jibe
- jig
- Jocelin
- jolly

== K ==
- kestrel

== L ==
- label
- lai
- lampoon
- lanyard
- lattice
- lawn
- lay "short song"
- lease
- lecher
- lecherous
- leotard
- lessee
- leud
- lickerish
- liege
- lingua franca
- list
- lobby
- locket
- lodge
- loggia
- logistics
- loin (disputed)
- loop (metallurgy) "hot bloom"
- lothario
- lottery
- lotto
- loupe
- louver
- lowboy
- luff
- luge
- lumber
- lurch (in games)
- lure

== M ==
- mackerel (disputed)
- maggot
- mail "post"
- maim
- malinger
- malkin
- mangle
- mannequin
- maraud
  - marauder
- march "walk, stride"
- march "border"
- margrave
- marque
- marquee
- marquis
- marshal
- marten
- mask (disputed)
  - mascara
  - masque
  - masquerade
- mason
- massacre (disputed)
- mayhem
- meringue (Latin merenda is suggested)
- merlin
- mignon
- mince (Etymonline suggests Latin minūtus)
- minion
- mitten (Etymonline suggests Latin medius)
- moat
- mock
- mooch
- morass
- morel
- morganatic
- mortgage
- motley
- moue
- mousse
- mow "scornful look"
- muffle
- murdrum
- muse
- mushroom (disputed)

== N ==
- nouveau riche

== O ==
- oboe
- ordalian
- ordalium
- orgillous
- orgulous
- osier

== P ==
- packet
- park
- parquet
- patch "clown, fool"
- patois
- patrol
- patten
- paw
- pawn "something left as security"
- perform
- picaresque
- piccolo
- picket
- picnic
- pike "weapon"
- pinch
- piquant
- pique
- pirouette
- pitcher "jug"
- placard
- plaque
- pledge
- poach "to push, poke"
- poach "to cook in liquid"
- pocket
- poke "sack"
- poltroon
- potpourri
- pottage
- pouch
- pouf

== Q ==
- queasy
- quiche
- quiver "case for arrows"

== R ==
- rabbit
- raffish
- raffle
- raiment
- ramp
- rampage
- rampant
- ranch
- random
- range
- ranger
- rank "order, position"
- rapier
- rasp
- raspberry
- ratchet
- rave (disputed)
- rearrange
- rebate (disputed)
- rebuff
- rebuke
- rebut
- rebuttal
- refresh
- refurbish
- regain
- regard
- regret
- regroup
- rehash
- relay
- remark
- replevin
- retire
- retouch
- reverie (disputed)
- reward
- reynard
- rhyme (disputed)
- ribald
- ribbon
- riches
- ricochet
- riffraff
- rifle "firearm"
- rifle "to plunder"
- rink
- rinse
- riot
- rivet
- roach "small fish"
- roan
- roast
- rob
- robe
- rocket "projectile"
- rogue (disputed)
- romp
- rotisserie
- rubbish
- rubble
- ruffian
- rummage

== S ==
- saber
- sable
- sackbut
- sacre bleu
- safeguard
- salon
- saloon
- saponification
- saponifier
- saponify
- scabbard
  - scaffolding
- scale (of a fish or reptile)
- scallop
- scaramouche
- scarf "strip of cloth"
- scarp
- scavage
- scavenge
- scavenger
- scherzo
- scion
- scorn
- screen
- scrimmage
- scroll
- scrum
- scupper
- seise
- seize
- seizure
- seneschal
- sense
- shock
- sirloin (disputed)
- skate
- skew
- skewbald
- skiff
- skirmish
- skive
- slash
- slat
- slate
- slender
- slice
- sloop
- slot "track, trail"
- sobriquet
- soil "to make dirty"
- soil "a wallow"
- soke
- sopaipilla
- sorrel "reddish brown"
- sorrel (plant)
- sound "to fathom, probe"
- soup
- souse
- spate
- spavin
- spell
- spelt (wheat)
- spool
- spy
- staccato
- stale "lure, decoy"
- stalemate
- stall "to delay"
- stallion
- stampede
- standard
- staple "mainstay"
- stay "prop, support"
- stockade
- stour "conflict"
- stout
- strand "string, fiber"
- strife
- strive
- stucco
- stuff
- sturgeon
- sully
- sup "to dine"
- supper
- surcoat

== T ==
- tabard
- tack
- taco
- tampion
- tampon
- tan
- tannin
- tap
- target
- tarnish
- tass
- tasse
- tasset
- teat
- tedesco
- tetchy
- tick "credit"
- ticket
- tier
- till "cashbox"
- tirade
- tire "wheel"
- toccata
- tocsin
- touch
- touché
- touchy
- toupee
- towel
- track
- trampoline
- trap "owndom, personal belongings"
  - trappings
- treacherous
- treachery
- treague
- trebuchet
- triage
- trial
  - trialist
- trick
- tricot
- trill
- trip
- troak
- troll "to stroll"
- trolley
- trollop
- trombone
- troop
- trot
- troupe
- trump "to deceive, cheat"
- trump "horn"
- trumpery
- trumpet
- try
- tryst
- tuffet
- tuft
- tumbrel
- tunnel
- turbot

== U ==
- unafraid
- unattached
- unblemished
- unbutton
- underbrush
- undeveloped
- undisguised
- uneasy (in part)
- unflattering
- unfurnished
- unguarded
- unmask (see mask)
- untouchable
- unwarranted

== V ==
- vadium
- vagrant (in part, Latinized)
- vandal
- vanguard
- veneer
- vermouth
- vogue

== W ==
- wad
- wafer
- wage "payment"
- wage "bet"
- wager
- waif
- wait
- waiter
- waive
- wallet
- wallop
- war
- warble
- warden
- warder
- wardrobe
- warmonger
- warrant "defender"
- warrant "to keep safe"
- warranty
- warren
- warrior
- warship
- waste "to spoil, squander"
- waste "desolate area"
- wastrel
- wayment
- wicket
- wile
- wince
- wreck

== Z ==
- zigzag

== See also ==
- Lists of English words by country or language of origin
- List of English words of French origin
- List of French words of Germanic origin
- List of Germanic and Latinate equivalents in English
- Anglish (Linguistic purism in English)

== Notes ==
=== References ===
- Online Etymology Dictionary.
- Auguste Brachet, An Etymological Dictionary of the French Language: Third Edition
- Centre National de Ressources Textuelles et Lexicales
- Dictionary.com.
- Diez, An Etymological Dictionary of the Romance Languages
