= Reborrowing =

Loanword returned to original language

Reborrowing is the process where a word travels from one language to another and then back to the originating language in a different form or with a different meaning. A reborrowed word is sometimes called a Rückwanderer (German, a 'returner').

The result is generally a doublet, where the reborrowed word exists alongside the original word, though in other cases the original word may have died out. Alternatively, a specific sense of a borrowed word can be reborrowed as a semantic loan; for example, English pioneer was borrowed from Middle French in the sense of "digger, foot soldier, pedestrian", then acquired the sense of "early colonist, innovator" in English, which was reborrowed into French. In other cases the term may be calqued (loan-translated) at some stage, such as English ready-to-wear → French prêt-à-porter (1951) → English prêt-à-porter (1957).

In some cases, the borrowing process can be more complicated and the words might move through different languages before coming back to the originating language. The single move from one language to the other is called "loan" (see loanword). Reborrowing is the result of more than one loan, when the final recipient language is the same as the originating one.

== Examples ==
Old Norse:	klubba	→	English:	club	→	Norwegian:	klubb ("association of people")
French:	tenez (Note: Imperative form of the verb tenir, "to hold".) ("hold!")	→	English:	tennis	→	French:	tennis (the sport)
French:	cotte	→	English:	riding coat	→	French:	redingote	→	English:	redingote
Old French:	bacoun	→	English:	bacon	→	French:	bacon
Greek:	κίνημα (kínēma, movement)	→	French:	cinéma(tographe)	→	Greek:	σινεμά (sinemá, cinema)
Dutch:	bolwerk (bulwark, bastion)	→	French:	boulevard	→	Dutch:	boulevard ("broad avenue")
Dutch:	manneken ("little man") (Note: Figuratively used in the Flemish textile industry for a model of a human figure on which clothing was created or displayed.)	→	French:	mannequin	→	Dutch:	mannequin ("catwalk model")
Dutch:	koekje (cookie)	→	English:	cookie	→	Dutch:	cookie ("web cookie")
Middle Dutch :	snacken /ˈsnɑkən/ ("to gasp/bite at")	→	English:	to snack	→	Dutch:	snacken /ˈsnɛkən/
English:	crack (fun)	→	Irish:	craic (fun)	→	English:	craic (news, gossip, fun, entertainment, happenings)
English:	animation	→	Japanese:	アニメ (Note: Borrowed from English directly as アニメーション (animēshon) and usually abbreviated to アニメ in a manner quite common in Japanese.) (anime)	→	English:	anime (Japanese animation)
English:	wife	→	Japanese:	ワイフ (Note: Borrowed from English directly as ワイフ as an alternative to the more traditional term 家内 (kanai).) (waifu)	→	English:	waifu (A fictional character whom a person regards as romantic partner. Doublet of wife)
English:	professional wrestling	→	Japanese:	プロレス (Note: Borrowed from English directly as プロフェッショナル・レスリング (purofesshonaru resuringu) and usually abbreviated to プロレス in a manner quite common in Japanese.) (puroresu)	→	English:	puroresu (Japanese professional wrestling)
English:	cutlet (Note: Cutlet itself was borrowed from the French côtelette.)	→	Japanese:	カツ (Note: Borrowed from English as カツレツ(katsuretsu) but later abbreviated to カツ.) (katsu)	→	English:	katsu (Japanese-style cutlets; in the UK, any kind of Japanese-style curry sauce)
Hebrew:	תַּכְלִית /taχˈlit/ (purpose)	→	Yiddish:	תכלית /ˈtaχləs/ (result; purpose; serious business)	→	Hebrew:	תַּכְלֶס /ˈtaχles/ (directly, matter-of-factly, cut the crap)
Spanish:	tronada (thunderstorm)	→	English:	tornado	→	Spanish:	tornado
Chinese:	革命 (dynastic changes)	→	Japanese:	革命 (kakumei; revolution)	→	Chinese:	革命 (revolution)
Chinese:	共和 (Gonghe Regency)	→	Japanese:	共和 (kyōwa; republic)	→	Chinese:	共和 (republic)
Chinese:	抹茶 (A lost way of tea-making)	→	Japanese:	抹茶 (matcha)	→	Chinese:	抹茶 (Japanese-style matcha)
Hokkien or Cantonese:	鮭汁 (kôe-chiap/kê-chiap; type of fish sauce)	→	English:	ketchup (table sauce/tomato ketchup)	→	Cantonese:	茄汁 (ke4*2 zap1; ketchup)
Old Turkic:	ülüş (share, portion)	→	Mongolian:	ulus (country, division)	→	Turkish:	ulus (nation)
Turkish:	bey armudu (bergamot, "lord's pear")	→	Italian:	bergamotto	→	French:	bergamote	→	Turkish:	bergamot
Middle Mongol:	jarlig (royal decree)	→	Russian:	ярлык (yarlyk; label, price tag)	→	Mongolian:	yarlyk (price tag)
Middle Persian:	handaz- (to plan, allot)	→	Arabic:	مهندس (mohandis; geometer, engineer)	→	Persian:	مهندس (mohandes; engineer)
Persian:	زرناپا (zornāpā; 'flute leg', giraffe)	→	Arabic:	زرافة (zarāfa/zurāfa; giraffe)	→	Persian:	زرافه (zarāfe; giraffe)

== Reborrowed morphemes ==
A similar process occurs when a word is coined in a language based on roots from another language, and then the compound is borrowed into this other language or a modern descendant. In the West, this primarily occurs with classical compounds, formed on Latin or Ancient Greek roots, which may then be borrowed into a Romance language or Modern Greek. Latin is sufficiently widespread that Latinate terms coined in a non-Romance language (such as English or German) and then borrowed by a Romance language (such as French or Spanish) are not conspicuous, but modern coinages on Ancient Greek roots borrowed into Modern Greek are, and include terms such as τηλεγράφημα tilegráfima ('telegram'). These are very common.

This process is particularly conspicuous in Chinese and Japanese, where in the late 19th and early 20th century many terms were coined in Japanese on Chinese roots (historically terms had often passed via Korea), known as wasei kango (和製漢語; Japanese-made Chinese-words), then borrowed into modern Chinese (and often Korean) with corresponding pronunciation; from the mid-20th century, such borrowings have been much rarer. Often these words could have been coined in Chinese, but happened to be coined first in Japanese; notable examples include 文化 bunka ('culture') and 革命 kakumei ('revolution').

== See also ==
- Gairaigo
- Inkhorn term
- Language contact
- Loanword
- Wanderwort
- Word coinage
