= Latin influence in English =

Latin influences on the Germanic language of English

Source languages of the English vocabulary
1. French, including Anglo-Norman (28.3%)
2. Latin, including modern scientific and technical Latin (28.2%)
3. Germanic languages (Old English, Old Norse, Dutch) (25.0%)
4. Greek (5.32%)
5. No etymology given (4.03%)
6. Derived from proper names (3.28%)
7. Other (5.83%)

Although English is classified as a Germanic language, it has been strongly influenced by Latin—primarily in its lexicon. Even though the grammar and core vocabulary of English are inherited from Proto-Germanic, a great deal of English vocabulary comes from Romance and Latinate sources. The vast majority of these borrowings come either directly from Latin or indirectly from Norman French and, later, Modern French; there are also a few borrowings from Italian, Portuguese, and Spanish. Other borrowings have come from Gothic or Frankish via French, or from Greek via Latin.

== Early Middle Ages ==
The Germanic tribes who were eventually the progenitors of the English language traded and fought with the Latin-speaking Roman Empire. Several words for common objects entered the tribes' vocabulary from Latin even before they reached Britain: camp, candle, cat, cheese, cook, fork, gem, inch, kitchen, mile, mill, mint [coin], noon, pillow, pound [unit of weight], radish, tile, street, wall, wine.

Christian missionaries coming to Britain in the 6th or and 7th century brought with them Latin religious terms—of which, again, some ultimately derived from Greek. Many of the technical terms in Christianity came from New Testament Greek and from the works of Greek-speaking fathers of the Church.

At this time, Christian monks wrote and copied text mainly in Latin, the prevalent lingua franca in medieval Europe. When monks did write in the vernacular, Latin words were translated using suitable Old English equivalents. A Germanic word was often adopted and given a new shade of meaning, as with Old English gōdspell ("gospel") for Latin evangelium (from Greek for "good news"). Previously, the Old English word simply meant "good news", but this meaning was extended to fit into a religious context. The same occurred with the Old Germanic pagan word blētsian, which meant "to sacrifice, consecrate by shedding blood". It was adapted by Old English scribes and Christianized to become the word bless. Similarly fullwiht (literally, "full-being") and the verb fullian came to mean "baptism" and "to baptise" respectively, though they may have referred to a rite of passage.

When a suitable Old English substitute could not be found, a Latin word would be chosen instead; many Latin words entered the Old English lexicon in this way. Such words include Old English tepid "carpet" from Latin tapetum, and sigel "brooch" from Latin sigillum; culcer and læfel "spoon" from Latin coclearium and labellum beside Old English spōn and hlædel (Modern English ladle); forca from Latin furca "fork" along with Old English gafol; scamol "chair, stool" from Latin scamellum beside native stōl, benc and setl. All told, approximately 600 words were borrowed from Latin during the Old English period. Often, the Latin word was tightly restricted in sense, and was not widely used by the general populace. Latin words tended to be literary or scholarly terms and were not very common. The majority of them did not survive into the Middle English Period.

== Middle Ages ==
The Norman Conquest of 1066 led to a two-tiered society England: the aristocracy spoke Anglo-Norman and the commoners spoke English. From 1066 until Henry IV ascended the throne in 1399, the English royal court spoke a Norman language that became progressively Gallicised through contact with Old French. The Norman rulers did not try to suppress the English language, other than not using it at all in their courts. In 1204, the Anglo-Normans lost their continental territories in Normandy and the connection with Anglo-Norman was severed. By the time Middle English arose as the dominant language in the late 14th century, the Normans had contributed roughly 10,000 words to English, about three-quarters of which survive. Continued use of Latin by the church and centres of learning brought a steady, though dramatically reduced, influx of new Latin lexical borrowings.

Since subjects like science and philosophy (including rhetoric and ethics), were communicated in Latin, the Latin vocabulary that developed for them became the source of a great many technical and abstract words. English words like abstract, subject, communicate, matter, probable and their cognates in other European languages generally have the meanings given to them in late Medieval Latin, and often terms for abstract concepts not available in English. Translated works that contributed significantly included Chaucer's Boece and Trevisa's translation of Bartholomaeus Anglicus's De proprietatibus rerum.

== Renaissance ==
During the English Renaissance, from around 1500–1650, some 10,000 to 12,000 words entered the English lexicon, including the words lexicon, aberration, allusion, anachronism, dexterity, enthusiasm, imaginary, juvenile, pernicious, sophisticated. Many of these words were borrowed directly from Latin, both in its classical and medieval forms. In turn, Late Latin also included borrowings from Greek.

== Industrial Age ==
The dawn of the age of scientific discovery in the 17th and 18th centuries led to the need for new words to describe new-found knowledge. Many words were borrowed from Latin, while others were coined from Latin roots, prefixes, and suffixes, and Latin word elements freely combine with elements from all other languages including native Anglo-Saxon words. Some of the words which entered English at this time are: apparatus, aqueous, carnivorous, component, corpuscle, data, experiment, formula, incubate, machinery, mechanics, molecule, nucleus, organic, ratio, structure, vertebra.

== Consequences for English ==
These days, in addition to a large number of historical borrowings and coinages, Latinate words continue to be coined in English – see classical compounds – particularly in technical contexts. A number of more subtle consequences include: numerous doublets – two or more cognate terms from both a Germanic and Latinate source (or Latinate sources), such as cow/beef; numerous cases of etymologically unrelated terms for closely related concepts, notably Germanic nouns with a Latin adjective, such as bird/avian or hand/manual; complicated etymologies due to indirect borrowings (via Romance) or multiple borrowings; and usage controversies over the perceived complexity of Latinate terms.

=== Noun/adjective doublets ===
As with Germanic/Latinate doublets from the Norman period, the use of Latinate words in the sciences has created pairs with a native Germanic noun and a Latinate adjective:

- animals: ant/formic, bee/apian, bird/avian, crow/corvine, cod/gadoid, carp/cyprine, fish/piscine, gull/larine, wasp/vespine, butterfly/papilionaceous, worm/vermian, spider/arachnid, snake/anguine (or serpentine), tortoise (or turtle)/testudinal, cat/feline, lion/leonine, rabbit/cunicular, hare/leporine, dog/canine, deer/cervine, reindeer/rangiferine, fox/vulpine, wolf/lupine, goat/caprine, sheep/ovine, swan/cygnean, duck/anatine, starling/sturnine, goose/anserine, dove/columbine, ostrich/struthious, horse/equine, chicken/gallinaceous, ox/bovine, pig/porcine, whale/cetacean, ape/simian, bear/ursine, human/hominine (gender specific: man/masculine, woman/feminine); these Germanic nouns can be made into adjectives by adding "-like".
- physiology: head/capital, body/corporal, ear/aural, eye/ocular or visual, nose/nasal, mouth/oral, tooth/dental, tongue/lingual, lips/labial, neck/cervical, shoulder/scapular, finger/digital, hand/manual, arm/brachial, foot/pedal, sole of the foot/plantar, leg/crural, thigh/femoral, chest/pectoral, nipple/papillary, brain/cerebral, mind/mental, nail/ungual, hair/pilar, lung/pulmonary, kidney/renal, blood/sanguine, heart/cardiac.
- astronomy: moon/lunar, sun/solar, earth/terrestrial, star/stellar.
- sociology: son or daughter/filial, mother/maternal, father/paternal, brother/fraternal, sister/sororal, wife/uxorial, uncle/avuncular.
- other: book/literary, edge/marginal, fire/igneous, water/aquatic, sea/marine, wind/vental, ice/glacial, boat (or ship)/naval, house/domestic, door/portal, window/fenestral, wall/mural, bridge/pontine, town/urban, sight/visual, ring/annular, tree/arboreal, bloom/floral, marsh/paludal, land (country)/national, sword/gladiate, king/regal, earl/comital, fighter/military, law/legal, church/ecclesiastical, bell/tintinnabulary, cooking/culinary, clothes/sartorial.

Thus Latin constitutes a linguistic superstratum for English just as Japanese has a Chinese superstratum and Hindustani has a Persian superstratum.

=== Indirect influence ===
It is not always easy to tell at what point a word entered English, or in what form. Some words have come into English from Latin more than once, through French or another Romance language at one time and directly from Latin at another. Thus there are pairs like fragile/frail, army/armada, corona/crown, ratio/reason, and rotund/round. The first word in each pair came directly from Latin, while the second entered English from French (or Spanish, in the case of armada). In addition, some words have entered English twice from French, with the result that they have the same source, but different pronunciations reflecting changing pronunciation in French, for example, chief/chef (the former a Middle English borrowing and the latter modern). Multiple borrowings explain other word pairs and groups with similar roots but different meanings and/or pronunciations: canal/channel, poor/pauper, coy/quiet, disc/disk/dish/desk/dais/discus.

=== Sociolinguistical consequences ===
David Corson in 'The Lexical Bar' (1985) defended the thesis that the large portion of Greco-Latinate words in academic English explains the difficulties of working class children in the education system. When exposed at home mainly to colloquial English (primarily Anglo-Saxon words), children may have more difficulty at school than their peers who have more access at home to academic words (often longer, more Greco-Latinate). This difference tends not to become less by education but greater, potentially impeding their access to academic or social careers. In various experiments and comparative studies Corson measured fewer differences between 12 year olds than 15 year olds due to their unfamiliarity with Greco-Latinate words in English and the way teachers deal with them. Corson's views were not always represented correctly. In his totally revised Using English Words (1995) the linguistic, historical, psychological and educational aspects have been integrated better.

== See also ==
- English words of Greek origin
- List of Latin words with English derivatives
- List of English words of French origin
- Classical compound
- Hybrid word
- List of Greek and Latin roots in English
- List of Latin phrases
- Latin mnemonics
- Latin school
- List of Latin abbreviations
- List of Latin and Greek words commonly used in systematic names
- List of Latinised names
- List of legal Latin terms
- Medical terminology
- Romanization (cultural)
- Toponymy
- Help:IPA/Latin
