= List of Latin words with English derivatives =

This is a list of Latin words with derivatives in the English language.

Ancient orthography did not distinguish between i and j or between u and v. Many modern works distinguish u from v but not i from j. In this article, both distinctions are shown as they are helpful when tracing the origin of English words. See also Latin phonology and orthography.

== Nouns and adjectives ==
The citation form for nouns (the form normally shown in Latin dictionaries) is the Latin nominative singular, but that typically does not exhibit the root form from which English nouns are generally derived.

Latin nouns and adjectives
A–M
Citation form	Declining stem	Meaning	English derivatives
abdomen	abdomin-	belly	abdomen, abdominal, abdominous, intra-abdominal
accipiter	accipitr-	hawk	Accipiter, accipitrine
acer	acer-	maple	aceric
ācer	ācr-	sharp	acrid, acridine, acridity, acrimonious, acrimony, acritude, acrity, acrolein, eager, vinegar
acerbus • acerbior • acerbissimus	acerb-	bitter	acerbic, acerbity, exacerbate, exacerbation
acervus	acerv-	heap	acerval, acervate, acervation, acervative, acervose, Acervulinacea, acervuline, acervulus, coacervate, coacervation
†acervulus	acervul-	heap	acerval, acervate, acervation, acervative, acervose, Acervulinacea, acervuline, acervulus, coacervate, coacervation
acētum	acēt-	vinegar	acetabuliform, acetabulum, acetate, acetic, acetone, aceturic, triacetate
acinus	acin-	berry	acinaceous, acinar, acinarious, aciniform, acinose, acinous, acinus, interacinous
acus	acer-	chaff	acerose
acus	acū-	needle	acicular, acuity, aculeate, aculeolate, aculeus, acumen, acuminate, acupuncture, acusector, acutance, acute, acutifoliate, acutilingual, acutilobate, aiguille, cute, eglantine, nonacuity, peracute, subacute
†acicula	acicul-	needle	acicular, acuity, aculeate, aculeolate, aculeus, acumen, acuminate, acupuncture, acusector, acutance, acute, acutifoliate, acutilingual, acutilobate, aiguille, cute, eglantine, nonacuity, peracute, subacute
†acula	acul-	needle	acicular, acuity, aculeate, aculeolate, aculeus, acumen, acuminate, acupuncture, acusector, acutance, acute, acutifoliate, acutilingual, acutilobate, aiguille, cute, eglantine, nonacuity, peracute, subacute
adeps	adip-	fat	adipocere, adipose
aedes, aedis	aed-	building	aedicule, aedile, cavaedium, edification, edifice, edile
†aedicula	aedicul-	building	aedicule, aedile, cavaedium, edification, edifice, edile
aemulus	aemul-, im-	to rival	emulate, emulation, emulator, emulous, image, imagerial, imagery, imagination, imaginative, imagine, imitable, imitate, imitation, inimitable, preimage, subimago
aequus	aequ-, -iqu-	even, level	adequacy, adequality, adequate, disequilibrium, equable, equal, equality, equanimity, equant, equation, equational, equative, equator, equatorial, equilibrium, equitable, equity, equivalence, equivalent, inadequacy, inadequate, inequality, iniquitous, iniquity
aes	aer-	ore	aeneator, aeneous, aeruginous, aerugite, aerugo, aim, disesteem, eruginous, esteem, estimable, estimate, inestimable
aestas	aest-	summer	aestival, aestivate, aestivation, estivate, estivator
aestus	aestu-		estuarial, estuarine, estuary
aetās	aet-	age	coetaneity, coetaneous
aevum	aev-	age, eon	age, coeternal, coeval, coevality, eternal, eterne, eviternal, grandevity, grandevous, longevity, longevous, mediaeval, nonage, premediaeval, primaeval, primeval
ager	agr-, -egr-	field	agrarian, agrestal, agricultural, agriculture, nonagrarian, nonagricultural, peragration, peregrine, peregrinus, pilgrim, pilgrimage
†agrellus	agrell-	field	agrarian, agrestal, agricultural, agriculture, nonagrarian, nonagricultural, peragration, peregrine, peregrinus, pilgrim, pilgrimage
āla (Note: Contracted from axilla)	āl-	wing	aileron, aisle, alar, alate, aliferous, aliform, aligerous
alacer • alacrior	alacr-	quick	alacritous, alacrity, allegresse, allegretto, allegro
albus • albior • albissimus	alb-	dull white	alb, alba, albarium, albedo, albino, albite, album, albumen, albumin, aubade
alga	alg-	seaweed	algae, algal, algicidal, algicide
alius	ali-	other	abalienate, alias, alibi, alien, alienability, alienable, alienate, alienation, aliquot, inalienability, inalienable, nonalien
allium, ālium	alli-	garlic	Allium
alter	alter-	other	adulterant, adulterate, adulteration, adulterine, adulterous, adultery, alter, alter ego, alterability, alterable, alterant, alteration, alterative, inalterable
alternus	altern-		altern, alternant, alternate, alternation, alternative, alternator, bialternant
alumnus	alumn-	alumnus	alumni
alveus	alve-		alveolar, alveolate, alveolus, interalveolar, postalveolar
†alveolus	alveol-		alveolar, alveolate, alveolus, interalveolar, postalveolar
amārus	amar-	bitter	amarelle, amaretti, amaretto, amarine, amaritude, amaro
ambō	amb-	both	ambient, ambiguous
amoenus	amoen-		amenity
amplus • amplior • amplissimus	ampl-	ample	ample, ampliate, ampliation, amplification, amplitude
anas	anat-	duck	Anas, anatine
ancūla	ancūl-		ancillary
†ancilla	ancill-		ancillary
anguis	angu-	snake	Anguidae, anguiform, Anguilla, anguilliform, anguine, anguineous
anguiculus	anguicul-	snake	Anguidae, anguiform, Anguilla, anguilliform, anguine, anguineous
†Anguilla	anguill-	snake	Anguidae, anguiform, Anguilla, anguilliform, anguine, anguineous
angulus	angul-	corner	angular, angularity, angulose, biangular, biangulate, equiangular, equiangularity, multangular, multiangular, nonrectangular, octangle, octangular, quadrangle, quadrangular, quinquangular, rectangle, rectangular, semiangle, semiangular, septangle, septangular, sexangle, sexangular, triangle, triangular, triangularity, triangulation
†angellus	angell-	corner	angular, angularity, angulose, biangular, biangulate, equiangular, equiangularity, multangular, multiangular, nonrectangular, octangle, octangular, quadrangle, quadrangular, quinquangular, rectangle, rectangular, semiangle, semiangular, septangle, septangular, sexangle, sexangular, triangle, triangular, triangularity, triangulation
anima	anim-	breath, life, soul	anima, animal, animalcule, animate, animation, animato, animator, exanimate, inanimate, reanimate
animus	anim-	mind, anger	animadversion, animose, animosity, animus, equanimity, equanimous, multanimous, nonunanimous, pusillanimity, pusillanimous, unanimity, unanimous
annus	ann-, -enn-	year	annals, annates, anniversary, annotinous, annual, annuity, biannual, bicentennial, biennial, biennium, bimillennial, centennial, decennial, millennial, millennium, octennial, per annum, perennate, perennial, quadrennial, quadrennium, quinquennial, quinquennium, semiannual, septennial, sexennial, superannuate, superannuation, triennial, triennium
ānser	ānser-	goose	Anser, anserine
†anserculus	ansercul-	gosling	Anser, anserine
antenna	antenn-		antenna, antennal, antennule
ānus	an-	ring	anal, annelid, Annelida, annular, annulate, annulation, annulus, anus, biannulate, circumanal, exannulate, penannular, semiannular, subanal
†ānulus	anul-	ring	anal, annelid, Annelida, annular, annulate, annulation, annulus, anus, biannulate, circumanal, exannulate, penannular, semiannular, subanal
†ānellus	anell-	ring	anal, annelid, Annelida, annular, annulate, annulation, annulus, anus, biannulate, circumanal, exannulate, penannular, semiannular, subanal
apis	ap-	bee	apian, apiarian, apiary, apiculture
aqua	aqu-	water	acquacotta, akvavit, aqua vitae, aquaculture, aquamanile, aquamarine, aquarelle, aquarial, aquarium, Aquarius, aquatic, aquatile, aqueduct, aqueous, aquifer, aquiferous, aquiform, ewer, gouache, semiaquatic, sewage, sewer, sewerage
†aquula	aquul-	water	acquacotta, akvavit, aqua vitae, aquaculture, aquamanile, aquamarine, aquarelle, aquarial, aquarium, Aquarius, aquatic, aquatile, aqueduct, aqueous, aquifer, aquiferous, aquiform, ewer, gouache, semiaquatic, sewage, sewer, sewerage
aquila	aquil-	eagle	Aquila, aquiline, aquilinity
arbiter (Note: Contracted from ad and bet-)	arbitr-	–	arbiter, arbitrable, arbitrage, arbitrageur, arbitral, arbitrament, arbitrarious, arbitrary, arbitrate, arbitration, arbitrator, arbitratrix, arbitress, nonarbitrary
arbor, arbōs	arbor-	tree	arboraceous, arboreal, arboreality, arboreous, arborescence, arborescent, arboretum, arboricide, arboriculture, arborous, arborvitae, arbuscle, arbuscular
†arbuscula	arbuscul-	tree	arboraceous, arboreal, arboreality, arboreous, arborescence, arborescent, arboretum, arboricide, arboriculture, arborous, arborvitae, arbuscle, arbuscular
arca	arc-		arcane
†arcula	arcul-		arcane
arcus	arc-	bow	arc, arciform, arco, arcuate
arduus	ardu-	steep	arduous
argentum	argent-	silver	argent, argentate, argenteous, argentiferous, Argentina, argentite
arma	arm-	arms (weapons)	alarm, ambry, armada, armadillo, armament, armamentarium, armarium, armature, armiferous, armiger, armigerous, armipotent, armistice, armor, armorial, armory, army, disarm, disarmament, gendarme, gendarmerie, nonarmigerous, rearm, rearmament
armus	arm-	shoulder	armill, armillary, armillifer
†armilla	armill-	shoulder	armill, armillary, armillifer
ars	art- -ert-	art, skill	artifact, artifice, artificial, artificiality, artisan, artisanal, artisanality, inartificial, inert, inertia, inertial, noninert, noninertial
artus	art-	tight	arctation, coarct, coarctate, coarctation
artūs	art-	joint	article, articulable, articulacy, articular, articulate, articulation, articulative, articulator, articulatory, biarticular, biarticulate, coarticulation, disarticulation, inarticulable, inarticulacy, inarticulate, interarticular, intra-articular, multiarticular, multiarticulate, quinquarticular, subarticle, triarticulate
†articulus	articul-	joint	article, articulable, articulacy, articular, articulate, articulation, articulative, articulator, articulatory, biarticular, biarticulate, coarticulation, disarticulation, inarticulable, inarticulacy, inarticulate, interarticular, intra-articular, multiarticular, multiarticulate, quinquarticular, subarticle, triarticulate
arvus	arv-	plowed	arval
as	ass- -uss-		ace, decussate, decussation, semis, tremissis
asinus	asin-	donkey	Aselli, asinine, Asinus, easel
†asellus	asell-	donkey	Aselli, asinine, Asinus, easel
asper	asper-	rough	asperate, asperatus, asperity, exasperate, exasperation
astus	ast-	craft	astute
audāx • audācior • audācissimus	audāc-	brave, bold	audacious, audacity
auris	aur-	ear	aural, auricle, auricular, auriculate, auriform, auscultation, biauricular, biauriculate, binaural, circumaural, interauricular, scout
†auricula	auricul-	ear	aural, auricle, auricular, auriculate, auriform, auscultation, biauricular, biauriculate, binaural, circumaural, interauricular, scout
aurum	aur-	gold	aurate, aureate, aureole, auriferous, aurification, aurous, dory, inaurate, inauration, oriole, orpiment
avēna	avēn-	oat	Avena, avenaceous, avenary, avener
avis	avi-	bird	aucupation, augur, auspex, auspicate, auspice, auspicious, Aves, avian, aviary, aviation, aviator, aviatrix, avicide, Avicula, aviculture, avifauna
†aucella	aucell-	bird	aucupation, augur, auspex, auspicate, auspice, auspicious, Aves, avian, aviary, aviation, aviator, aviatrix, avicide, Avicula, aviculture, avifauna
†avicula	avicul-	bird	aucupation, augur, auspex, auspicate, auspice, auspicious, Aves, avian, aviary, aviation, aviator, aviatrix, avicide, Avicula, aviculture, avifauna
avunculus	avuncul-	uncle, mother's brother	avuncular, avunculate, avunculicide, avunculocal, uncle
axis	axi-	axle	abaxial, adaxial, axial, axiality, axifugal, axile, biaxial, biaxiality, coaxial, interaxial, multiaxial, semiaxis, triaxial, triaxiality, uniaxial
baca	bac-	berry	baccalaureate, baccate, bacciferous, bacciform, baccivorous, bagasse, bagatelle
†bacula	bacul-	berry	baccalaureate, baccate, bacciferous, bacciform, baccivorous, bagasse, bagatelle
baculum	bacul-	staff	bacillary, bacilliform, bacillus, baculiform, baculine, baguette, debacle, imbecile, imbecility
†bacillum	bacill-	staff	bacillary, bacilliform, bacillus, baculiform, baculine, baguette, debacle, imbecile, imbecility
bāiulus, bājulus	bāiul-	carrier	bail, bailee, bailie, bailiff, bailiwick, bailliage, baillie, bailment, bailor
barba	barb-	beard	barb, barbate, barbel, barbellate, barber, barbet, barbicel, barbine, barbule, rebarbative
†barbula	barbul-	beard	barb, barbate, barbel, barbellate, barber, barbet, barbicel, barbine, barbule, rebarbative
bassus	bass-	low	abase, abasement, bas-relief, base, basset, basso, bassoon, bassus, debase, debasement
beatus	beat-	blessed	beatification, Beatitudes
bellum	bell-	war	antebellum, bellic, bellicose, bellicosity, belligerence, belligerent, debellatio, imbellic, rebel, rebellion, revel, revelment, revelry
bellus	bell-	pretty	beautiful, beauty, embellish, embellishment
bene	ben-	well	benediction, benedictional, benedictory, benefaction, benefactive, benefactor, benefactrix, benefic, benefice, beneficence, beneficent, benefit, benign, benignity
bestia	besti-	animal	beast, bestial, bestiary
bini	bin-	two each	binary, binate, combination, combinatorial, combine, recombinant
bonus • melior • optimus	bon- • melior- • optim-	good • better • best	bonbon, bonify, bonitary, bonus, boon, debonair • ameliorate, amelioration, meliority • optimal, optimate, optimum, suboptimal
bōs	bov-	cow, ox	bovine, bovinic acid
botulus	botul-	sausage	botulin, boudin
†botellus	botell-	sausage	botulin, boudin
bracchium	brac-	arm, support	embrace, braces, bracelet
brevis	brev-	brief, short	abbreviate, abbreviation, breve, brevet, breviary, brevity, brief, debrief
bucca	bucc-	cheek, mouth, cavity	buccal, buccinator muscle, buckle, debouch, debuccalization
†buccula	buccul-	cheek, mouth, cavity	buccal, buccinator muscle, buckle, debouch, debuccalization
bulbus	bulb-	bulbous	bulb, bulbar, bulbose, bulbous, bulbule
†bulbulus	bulbul-	bulbous	bulb, bulbar, bulbose, bulbous, bulbule
bulla	bull-	bubble, flask	bill, billet, boil, boilery, bola, bolillo, bouillon, bowl, bull, bulla, bullion, ebullience, ebullient, ebullition, garboil
bursa	burs-	pouch, purse	bolson, bourse, bursa, bursar, bursary, disbursal, disburse, disbursement, imburse, reimburse, reimbursement
caballus	caball-	horse	caballero, cavalcade, cavalero, cavalier, cavalry, chevalier, chivalrous, chivalry
calvus	calv-	bald	calvarium, Calvary, Calvin, calvities, calvity, calvous
calx	calc- -culc-	heel	calcaneal, calcaneum, calcaneus, calque, calzone, caulk, inculcate, inculcation, recalcitrance, recalcitrant, retrocalcaneal
calx	calc-	limestone, pebble	calcareous, calciferous, calcific, calcification, calciform, calcite, calcium, calculability, calculable, calculate, calculation, calculator, calculus, caliche, chalk, decalcification, incalculable, precalculate, recalcification, recalculate
†calculus	calcul-	limestone, pebble	calcareous, calciferous, calcific, calcification, calciform, calcite, calcium, calculability, calculable, calculate, calculation, calculator, calculus, caliche, chalk, decalcification, incalculable, precalculate, recalcification, recalculate
camera	camer-	vault	antechamber, bicameral, cabaret, camaraderie, camber, camera, chamber, chamberlain, comrade, concamerate, concameration, multicamera, multicameral, tricameral, unicameral
camisia	camisi-	shirt	camisade, camisado, Camisard, camisole, chemise
campus	camp-	field	camp, campaign, campesino, campestral, campo, campsite, campus, champart, champarty, champertous, champerty, champignon, champion, decamp, decampment, encamp, encampment
cancer	cancr-	crab	cancer, cancerate, cancerous, cancriform, cancrine, canker, precancerous
candēla	candēl-	candle	candela, candelabra, candelabrum, chandelier, chandler, chandlery
canis	can-	dog	canaille, canary, canicular, canicule, canid, canine, Canis, Canis Major, postcanine
cānus	cān-	gray, grey	canescence, canescent
capanna	capann-		cabana, cabin, cabinetry
caper, capra	capr-	goat	cabriole, cabriolet, caper, capreolate, capric, Capricorn, caprid, caprifig, capriform, caprigenous, caprine, capriole
†capellus	capell-	goat	cabriole, cabriolet, caper, capreolate, capric, Capricorn, caprid, caprifig, capriform, caprigenous, caprine, capriole
†capreolus, capreola	capreol-	goat	cabriole, cabriolet, caper, capreolate, capric, Capricorn, caprid, caprifig, capriform, caprigenous, caprine, capriole
capillus	capill-	hair	capellini, capillaceous, capillarity, capillary, capilliform, capillose, dishevel, dishevelment, precapillary
capsa	caps-	box, case	caisson, cajón, capsicum, capsular, capsule, case, cashier, cassette, cassone, chassis, encapsulant, encapsulate, encapsulation, encase, encasement, incase, incasement, intracapsular, subcapsular
†capsella	capsell-	box, case	caisson, cajón, capsicum, capsular, capsule, case, cashier, cassette, cassone, chassis, encapsulant, encapsulate, encapsulation, encase, encasement, incase, incasement, intracapsular, subcapsular
†capsula	capsul-	box, case	caisson, cajón, capsicum, capsular, capsule, case, cashier, cassette, cassone, chassis, encapsulant, encapsulate, encapsulation, encase, encasement, incase, incasement, intracapsular, subcapsular
caput	capit-, -cipit-	head	achievable, achieve, achievement, ancipital, ancipitous, biceps, bicipital, cabotage, cad, caddie, cadet, cape, cap, capital, capitular, capitulary, capitulate, capitulation, capitule, capitulum, capo, capodecina, caporegime, captain, captaincy, cattle, caudillo, centicipitous, chapter, chaptrel, chattel, chef, chief, chieftain, co-captain, co-captaincy, decapitate, decapitation, occipital, occiput, per capita, precipice, precipitando, precipitation, precipitous, quadriceps, quadricipital, recapitulate, sincipital, sinciput, sous-chef, subcaptain, tri-captain, triceps, tricipital, unicipital, vice-captain, vice-captaincy
†capitellum	capitell-	head	
†capitulum	capitul-	head	
carbo	carbon-	coal	bicarbonate, carbon, carbonate, carbonation, Carboniferous, carbuncle, radiocarbon
carcer, cancer	carcer-	jail	cancel, cancellable, cancellate, cancellation, cancellous, cancellus, chancel, chancellery, chancellor, chancery, incarcerate, incarceration, subchancel
†cancelli	cancell-	jail	cancel, cancellable, cancellate, cancellation, cancellous, cancellus, chancel, chancellery, chancellor, chancery, incarcerate, incarceration, subchancel
cardo	cardin-	hinge	cardinal, cardinality, kern
carduus	cardu-	thistle	card
cariēs	cari-	decay	cariosity, carious
carīna	carīn-	keel	careen
caro	carn-	flesh	carnage, carnal, carnary, carnate, carnation, carneous, carnival, carnivore, carnose, carnosity, carrion, caruncle, carunculate, charcuterie, charnel, discarnate, incarnadine, incarnate, incarnation, reincarnate, reincarnation
carrus, carrum	carr-	wheeled vehicle	car, career, cargo, caricature, carriage, carry, charge, chargé, chargée, chariot, charioteer, charrette, countercharge, discharge, dischargee, encharge, multicar, recharge, surcharge
cartilago	cartilagin-	cartilage	cartilage, cartilaginous, noncartilaginous, precartilage
cārus • cārior • cārissimus	cār-	dear	caress, caressive, charitable, charity, cherish, cherishable, noncharitable
casa	cas-	house	casino
cāseus	cāse-	cheese	caseic, casein, caseous, cheese, quesadilla
castrum	castr-	fort	-caster, castellan, castellation, castle, chateau, chatelain, Chester
†castellum	castell-	fort	-caster, castellan, castellation, castle, chateau, chatelain, Chester
castus • castior • castissimus	cast-, -cest-	pure	caste, castigate, castigation, castigator, chaste, chasten, chastenment, chastity, incest, incestuous
catēna	catēn-	chain	catenary, catenate, catenation, catenative, catenulate, chain, concatenate, concatenation, enchain, enchaînement, nonconcatenative
†catēnula	catēnul-	chain	catenary, catenate, catenation, catenative, catenulate, chain, concatenate, concatenation, enchain, enchaînement, nonconcatenative
cauda	caud-, cod-	tail	cauda, caudal, caudate, caudicle, coda, codetta, curvicaudate, dequeue, enqueue, queue
†caudicula	caudicul-	tail	cauda, caudal, caudate, caudicle, coda, codetta, curvicaudate, dequeue, enqueue, queue
caulis	caul-, col-	stalk, stem	caulescent, caulicle, cauliflorous, cauliflory, cauliform, cauline, choux
†cauliculus	caulicul-	stalk, stem	caulescent, caulicle, cauliflorous, cauliflory, cauliform, cauline, choux
causa	caus-, -cus-	motive, accusation	accusal, accusation, accusative, accusativity, accusatory, accuse, causality, causation, causative, causativity, excusable, excuse, inexcusable, irrecusable, recusal, recusancy, recusant, recuse, ruse, rush
cavus	cav-	hollow	biconcave, biconcavity, cage, cajole, cajolement, caval, cavate, cavatina, cave, cavea, cavern, cavernicolous, cavernous, cavernulous, cavicorn, cavitation, cavity, concave, concavity, encage, excavate, excavation, excavator, quasiconcave, quasiconcavity
celeber	celebr-	famous	celebrant, celebrate, celebration, celebratory, celebrity, concelebration
celer • celerior • celerrimus	celer-	quick, swift	accelerando, accelerant, accelerate, acceleration, accelerator, celerity, decelerando, decelerate, deceleration, decelerator
centeni	centen-	hundred each	bicentenary, centenarian, centenary, centenionalis, supercentenarian, ultracentenarian
centesimus	centesim-	hundredth	centavo, centesimal, centesimation, centime, céntimo
centum	cent-	hundred	cent, centennial, centifidous, centillion, centurial, centurion, century, semicentennial, sesquicentennial, tricentennial
cera	cer-	wax	ceraceous, cereous, ceresin, inceration
cerebrum	cerebr-	brain	cerebellar, cerebellum, cerebral, cerebrifugal, cerebripetal, intracerebral
†cerebellum	cerebell-	brain	cerebellar, cerebellum, cerebral, cerebrifugal, cerebripetal, intracerebral
certus	cert-	certain	ascertain, ascertainable, certificate, certification, certiorari, certitude, decertification, incertitude, recertification
cervīx	cervīc-	neck	cervical, cervix, intracervical
cervus	cerv-	deer	cervid, Cervidae, cervine
ceterus	ceter-	other	et cetera
cibus	cib-	food	cibarious, cibarium, cibation
cicātrīx	cicātrīc-	scar	cicatrice
cilium	cili-	eyelash	cilia, ciliary, ciliate, ciliation, supercilious
cinis	ciner-	ashes	cinder, cinerarium, cinerary, cinereous, cinerin, incinerate, incineration, incinerator
cippus	cipp-	stake	cep
circus	circ-	circle	bicircular, circa, circinate, circular, circularity, circulate, circulation, circulator, circulatory, circumcircle, circus, cirque, encircle, encirclement, multicircular, noncircular, quasicircle, recirculate, recirculation, recirculator, research, ricercar, search, searchable, semicircle, semicircular, tricircular
†circulus	circul-	circle	bicircular, circa, circinate, circular, circularity, circulate, circulation, circulator, circulatory, circumcircle, circus, cirque, encircle, encirclement, multicircular, noncircular, quasicircle, recirculate, recirculation, recirculator, research, ricercar, search, searchable, semicircle, semicircular, tricircular
†circellus	circell-	circle	bicircular, circa, circinate, circular, circularity, circulate, circulation, circulator, circulatory, circumcircle, circus, cirque, encircle, encirclement, multicircular, noncircular, quasicircle, recirculate, recirculation, recirculator, research, ricercar, search, searchable, semicircle, semicircular, tricircular
cirrus	cirr-	curl, tentacle	cirrate, cirriform, cirriped, cirrose, cirrous, cirrus
citer • citerior • citimus	citr- • citerior- • citim-	on this side • •	• citerior •
cīvis	cīv-	citizen	citadel, city, civil, civilian, civility, incivil, incivility, intercity
clārus • clārior • clārissimus	clār-	clear	chiaroscuro, clairaudience, claircognizance, Claire, clairgustance, clairolfactus, clairsentience, clairvoyance, clairvoyant, Clara, clarain, claret, clarificant, clarification, clarify, clarinet, clarion, Clarissa, claritude, clarity, clear, clearage, clearance, cleartext, declarable, declaration, declarative, declaratory, declare, éclair, glair, glaireous, redeclare
clavis	clav-	key	claves, clavicle, clavier, enclave, exclave
†clāvicula	clāvicul-	key	claves, clavicle, clavier, enclave, exclave
clemens	clement-	mild	clemency, clement, inclemency, inclement
codex	codic-		code, codex, codical, codicil
†codicillus	codicill-		code, codex, codical, codicil
collis	coll-	hill	colliculus
†colliculus	collicul-	hill	colliculus
collum	coll-	neck	collar
color	color-	color	bicolor, Colorado, coloration, coloratura, concolorous, decolor, discolor, discoloration, multicolor, tricolor, unicolor, versicolor
cōlum	cōl-	strainer	colander, coulee, coulis, coulisse, couloir, cullender, cullis, percolate, percolation, percolator, piña colada, portcullis
columba	columb-	dove	columbarium, columbary, Columbella, columbine
cor	cord-	heart	accord, accordance, accordant, accordatura, concord, concordance, concordant, concordat, corcle, cordate, cordial, cordiality, cordiform, core, courage, courageous, discord, discordance, discordant, discourage, discouragement, encourage, encouragement, nonaccordant, obcordate, record, scordatura
†corcillum	corcill-	heart	accord, accordance, accordant, accordatura, concord, concordance, concordant, concordat, corcle, cordate, cordial, cordiality, cordiform, core, courage, courageous, discord, discordance, discordant, discourage, discouragement, encourage, encouragement, nonaccordant, obcordate, record, scordatura
†corculum	corcul-	heart	accord, accordance, accordant, accordatura, concord, concordance, concordant, concordat, corcle, cordate, cordial, cordiality, cordiform, core, courage, courageous, discord, discordance, discordant, discourage, discouragement, encourage, encouragement, nonaccordant, obcordate, record, scordatura
corbis	corb-	basket	corb, corf
corium	cori-	skin, hide	coriaceous, excoriate
cornū	corn-	horn	bicorn, bicorne, Capricorn, cornea, corneal, corneous, corner, cornicle, corniculate, corniferous, cornification, corniform, cornucopia, quadricorn, quadricornous, tricorn, tricorne, tricornigerous, tricornute, unicorn, unicornous
†corniculum	cornicul-	horn	bicorn, bicorne, Capricorn, cornea, corneal, corneous, corner, cornicle, corniculate, corniferous, cornification, corniform, cornucopia, quadricorn, quadricornous, tricorn, tricorne, tricornigerous, tricornute, unicorn, unicornous
cornus	corn-	dogwood	cornaceous, cornel, Cornus
†cornicula	cornicul-	dogwood	cornaceous, cornel, Cornus
corona	coron-	crown	corolla, corollaceous, corollarial, corollary, corona, coronamen, coronary, coronate, coronation, coronavirus, coroner, coronet, coroniform, Coronilla, crown, incoronate
†corolla	coroll-	crown	corolla, corollaceous, corollarial, corollary, corona, coronamen, coronary, coronate, coronation, coronavirus, coroner, coronet, coroniform, Coronilla, crown, incoronate
corpus	corpor-	body	accorporate, bicorporal, concorporate, concorporation, corporal, corporality, corporate, corporation, corporative, corporature, corporeal, corporeality, corporeity, corps, corpse, corpulence, corpulent, corpus, corpuscle, corpuscular, disincorporate, disincorporation, extracorporeal, incorporal, incorporality, incorporate, incorporation, incorporeal, incorporeality, incorporeity, tricorporal
†corpusculum	corpuscul-	body	accorporate, bicorporal, concorporate, concorporation, corporal, corporality, corporate, corporation, corporative, corporature, corporeal, corporeality, corporeity, corps, corpse, corpulence, corpulent, corpus, corpuscle, corpuscular, disincorporate, disincorporation, extracorporeal, incorporal, incorporality, incorporate, incorporation, incorporeal, incorporeality, incorporeity, tricorporal
cortex	cortic-	bark, rind	cortical, corticate, corticiform, corticifugal, corticipetal, decorticate, decortication, decorticator
coruscus	corusc-	vibrate	coruscant, coruscate, coruscation
corvus	corv-	raven	corbel, cormorant, corvine
†corvellus	corvell-	raven	corbel, cormorant, corvine
costa	cost-	rib	accost, bicostate, coast, coastal, costa, costal, costate, curvicostate, entrecôte, infracostal, intercostal, intracoastal, multicostate, quadricostate, supracostal, tricostate, unicostate
cotoneum	cotōne-	quince	cotoneaster
coxa	cox-	hip	coxal
crapula	crapul-	inebriation	crapulence, crapulent
cras	cras-	tomorrow	crastination, procrastinate, procrastination, procrastinator
crassus	crass-	thick	crass, crassitude, crassulaceous
crātis	crāt-	lattice, wickerwork	crate, grate, graticulation, graticule, griddle, grill, grillade, grillage, grille
†craticula	craticul-	lattice, wickerwork	crate, grate, graticulation, graticule, griddle, grill, grillade, grillage, grille
crēna	crēn-	notch	bicrenate, crena, crenate, crenation, crenature, crenulate, crenulation
†crēnula	crēnul-	notch	bicrenate, crena, crenate, crenation, crenature, crenulate, crenulation
creta	cret-	chalk	cretaceous
cribrum	cribr-	sieve	cribble, cribellum, cribrate, cribriform, garble
†cribellum	cribell-	sieve	cribble, cribellum, cribrate, cribriform, garble
crimen (Note: Contracted from cernimen)	crimin-	judgment, offense	criminal, criminality, criminate, incriminate, recriminate, recrimination
crīnis	crīn-	hair	crinel, crinigerous, crinite, crinoline, crinose, crinosity
crispus	crisp-	curled	crape, crepe, crêpe, crisp, crispate, crispation
crista	crist-	crest	crease, crest, cristate
crudelis	crudel-	rude, ruthless, cruel	cruel, crude
crus	crur-	leg, shank	bicrural, crural, crus, equicrural
crusta	crust-	rind, shell, crust	crostata, croustade, croûte, crouton, crust, crustacean, crustaceous, crustal, crustation, crustific, crustose, custard, duricrust, encrust, encrustation, incrust, incrustation
crux	cruc-	cross	crucial, cruciate, crucifer, cruciferous, crucifix, crucifixion, cruciform, crucify, crucigerous, crusade, cruzeiro, discruciate, excruciate
cucullus	cucull-	hood	cowl, cucullate
cuculus	cucul-	cuckoo	cuculiform
cucurbita	cucurbit-	gourd	cucurbit, Cucurbita, cucurbitaceous
culcita	culcit-	mattress	quilt
culex	culic-	gnat	Culex, culiciform, culicifuge, culicine, Culicivora
culina	culin-	kitchen	culinarian, culinary, kiln
culpa	culp-	blame, fault	culpability, culpable, culprit, exculpate, exculpatory, inculpable, inculpate, inculpatory, mea culpa
culter	cultr-	knife	colter, coulter, cultellus, cutlass, cutler, cutlery
†cultellus	cultell-	knife	colter, coulter, cultellus, cutlass, cutler, cutlery
cūlus	cul-	buttocks	culet, culottes, recoil
cumulus	cumul-	heap	accumulate, accumulation, accumulator, cumulate, cumulative, cumulativity, cumuliform, cumulose, cumulous, cumulus
cūnae	cūn-	cradle	cunabula, incunable, incunabula, incunabular, incunabulum
cuneus	cune-	wedge	coign/coigne, coin, cuneate, cuneiform, cuneus, encoignure, obcuneate, precuneus, quoin, sconcheon/scuncheon
cūpa	cūp-	tub, goblet, cask	cooper, cooperage, cup, cupel, cupellation, cupola, cupule
†cūpella	cūpell-	tub, goblet, cask	cooper, cooperage, cup, cupel, cupellation, cupola, cupule
†cūpula	cūpul-	tub, goblet, cask	cooper, cooperage, cup, cupel, cupellation, cupola, cupule
cura	cur-	care	accuracy, accurate, assecure, assurance, assure, curable, curate, curative, curator, cure, curettage, curette, curio, curiosity, curious, ensure, inaccurate, incurable, insecure, insecurity, insurability, insurable, insurance, insure, pococurante, proctor, proctorage, procurable, procuracy, procuration, procurator, procure, procurement, proxy, reassurance, reassure, reinsurance, reinsure, scour, scourage, secure, security, sinecural, sinecure, sure, surety
currus	curr-	chariot	corral, curule
curtus	curt-	shortened	curt, curtail, curtate, decurt
curvus	curv-	bent	curb, curvate, curvation, curvature, curve, curviform, curvilinear, curvity, incurvate, incurvature, incurve, recurvate, recurve, recurvous
cuspis	cuspid-	tip	bicuspid, bicuspidate, cusp, quadricuspid, tricuspid
custos	custod-	guardian	custodial, custodian, custody, noncustodial
cutis	cut-	hide, skin	cutaneous, cuticle, cuticolor, cuticular, cutin, cutis, cutisector, subcutaneous
†cuticula	cuticul-	hide, skin	cutaneous, cuticle, cuticolor, cuticular, cutin, cutis, cutisector, subcutaneous
damnum	damn- -demn-	harm	condemn, condemnation, damage, damnation, damnific, damnify, indemnification, indemnify, indemnity
decem	decem-	ten	dean, deanery, decan, decanal, December, decemfid, decempedal, decemvirate, decemviri, decennary, decennial, decennium, decuple, decurion, decurionate, decury, dicker, doyen, doyenne
decimus	decim-	tenth	decimal, decimate, decimation, dime
decus	decor-		decor, décor, decorament, decorate, decoration, decorative, decorator, decorous, decorum, redecorate
deni	den-	ten each	denar, denarian, denarius, denary, denier, dinar, dinero, dinheiro
dens	dent-	tooth	bident, bidental, dental, dentate, denticity, denticle, denticulate, dentiferous, dentiform, dentifrice, dentil, dentin, dentinal, dentition, denture, indent, indentation, indenture, interdental, intradental, multidentate, quadridentate, trident, tridentate
†denticulus	denticul-	tooth	bident, bidental, dental, dentate, denticity, denticle, denticulate, dentiferous, dentiform, dentifrice, dentil, dentin, dentinal, dentition, denture, indent, indentation, indenture, interdental, intradental, multidentate, quadridentate, trident, tridentate
densus	dens-	thick	condensable, condensate, condensation, condense, dense, density, nondense
deter • dēterior • dēterrimus	deter- • deterior- • deterrim-	• worse • worst	• deterior, deteriorate, deterioration •
deus	de-	god	deicidal, deicide, deific, deification, deiform, deity
dexter • dexterior • dextimus	dextr- • dexterior- • dextim-	right	ambidextrous, dexterity, dexterous, dextral, dextrality, dextrin, dextrorse, dextrose • •
diēs	diē-	day	adjourn, adjournment, aggiornamento, antemeridian, circadian, dial, diary, diurnal, diurnality, infradian, jornada, journal, journey, meridian, meridional, nundinal, per diem, postmeridian, quotidian, semidiurnal, sojourn, transmeridional, triduan, triduum, ultradian
dictum, indicatio	dict-/dit-	word	air-conditioning, Benedict, Benedictine, benediction, benedictive, benedictory, benison coindication, contraindicate, contraindication, contraindicative, condiction, condition, conditional, conditionalism, conditionalist, conditionality, conditionalize, conditionally, conditionate, conditioned, conditioner, conditioning, contradict, contradictable, contradictedness, contradiction, contradictionist, contradictious, contradictiously, contradictive, contradictively, contradictor, contradictorily, contradictory, dedicand, dedicate, dedicated-looking, dedicatee, dedication, dedicational, dedicative, dedicator, dedicatorial, dedicatorily, dedicatory decondition, dictate, dictionary, dictum, dijudicate, fatidical, forejudge, forjudgment, predict
digitus	digit-	finger, toe	bidigitate, digit, digital, digitate, digitiform, digitigrade, multidigit, multidigitate
dignus	dign-	worthy	condign, deign, dignify, dignitarial, dignitary, dignity, disdain, indign, indignance, indignant, indignation, indignity
dirus	dir-	fearful	dire
discipulus	discipul-	student	disciple, disciplinarian, disciplinary, discipline, interdisciplinarity, interdisciplinary, multidisciplinary, transdisciplinarity
divus	div-	god	divination, divinatory, divine, divinity
dominus	domin-	lord	beldam/beldame, codomain, codominance, codominant, condominium, dam, dame, damsel, demesne, demoiselle, domain, dominance, dominant, dominate, domination, dominative, dominator, dominatrix, domine, domineer, dominicide, dominion, dominium, domino, duenna, madam, madame, mademoiselle, madonna, predominance, predominant, predominate, semidominance, subdominant, superdominant
domus	dom-	house	domal, dome, domestic, domesticate, domestication, domesticity, domestique, domicile, domiciliary, major-domo, semidome
dōnum	dōn-	gift	condonation, condone, donation, donative, donator, donatory, pardon, pardonable
dorsum	dors-	back	disendorse, dorsal, dorsum, dossier, endorse, endorsee, endorsement, indorse, indorsement, reredos
dos	dot-	dowry	dotal, dotation dowager dowry endow endowment
drappus	drapp-	cloth	drab, drape, drapery
dulcis	dulc-	sweet	billet-doux, dolce, dolcetto, douce, doux, dulcet, dulcian, dulcify, dulcimer, edulcorant, edulcorate, subdulcid
duo	du-	two	deuce, doubt, dual, duality, dubiety, dubious, duet, duo, duplex, duumvirate, duumviri, nonduality
duodecim	duodec-	twelve	dozen, duodecennial, duodecillion
duodecimus	duodec-	twelfth	duodecimal
duodeni	duoden-	twelve each	duodenal, duodenary, duodenum
duplus	dupl-	twofold	dobla, double, doubloon, doublure, duplation, duple, redouble, semidouble
durus	dur-	hard	dour, durability, durable, duration, durative, duress, durum, endurable, endurance, endurant, endure, indurate, induration, nondurable, obdurate, obduration, perdurable, perdurance, perdure, subdural
ebrius	ebri-	drunk	inebriant, inebriate, inebriation, inebriety, sober, sobriety
ensis	ens-	sword	ensiferous, ensiform
equus	equ-	horse	equestrian, equine
eruca	eruc-	caterpillar	eruciform
exterus • exterior • extremus	exter- • exterior- • extrem-	• outer • outmost	extern, external, externality • exterior • extreme, extremity, extremum
faba	fab-	bean	faba bean, fabaceous, aquafaba
faber	fabr-		fabric, fabrication, fabricator
facilis	facil-	easy	facile, facilitate, facility
faenum	faen-	hay	fennel, sainfoin
falx	falc-	sickle	defalcation, falcate, falciform
fames	fam-	hunger	famine, famish
fanum	fan-	temple	profane, profanity
fascis	fasc-	bundle	fasces, fascicle, fascicular, fasciculation, fascine
†fasciculus	fascicul-	bundle	fasces, fascicle, fascicular, fasciculation, fascine
fatuus	fatu-	foolish, useless	fatuous, infatuation
fauces	fauc-, -foc-	throat	faucal, suffocate, suffocation
febris	febr-	fever	antefebrile, febrifacient, febriferous, febrifuge, febrile
fēlēs	fēl-	cat	felid, Felinae, feline
fēlix	fēlic-	happy	felicitations, felicitous, felicity
fēmina	fēmin-	woman	effeminacy, effeminate, feminine, feminism, feminist, femininity
femur	femor-	thigh	femoral, femur
fenestra	fenestr-	window	defenestration
ferox	feroc-	fierce	ferocious, ferocity
ferrum	ferr-	iron	farrier, farriery, ferrate, ferrite, ferreous, ferrous, ferruginous, ferrugo, nonferrous
ferus	fer-	wild	feral, ferine, ferocious, ferocity, fierce
festūca	festūc-		fescue, Festuca
festus	fest-		feast, festal, festival, festive, festivity, festivous, festoon, Festus, fete, fiesta, infestive
feudum	feud-	fee	feodary, feudal, feudary, feudatory, subinfeudation
fibra	fibr-		defibrillate, defibrillation, defibrillator, fiber, fibre, fibriform, fibril, fibrillar, fibrillate, fibrin, fibrinous, fibrous, multifibrous
†fibrilla	fibrill-		defibrillate, defibrillation, defibrillator, fiber, fibre, fibriform, fibril, fibrillar, fibrillate, fibrin, fibrinous, fibrous, multifibrous
fībula (Note: Contracted from figibula)	fībul-	clasp, fastener	fibula, fibular, infibulate, infibulation
ficus	fic-	fig	Ficus
fidēs	fid-	faith, trust	affiance, affiant, affidavit, confidant, confidante, confide, confidence, confident, confidential, confidentiality, defiance, defiant, defy, diffide, diffidence, diffident, faith, feal, fealty, fiancé, fiancée, fidelity, fiducial, fiduciary, infidel, infidelity, interfaith, multifaith, perfidious, perfidy, prefident
fīlia fīlius	fīli- fīli-	daughter son	affiliate, affiliation, affiliative, disaffiliate, disaffiliation, filial, filiate, filiation, filicide, filiety, nonaffiliation
filum	fil-	thread	bifilar, defilade, defile, enfilade, filament, filarial, filariform, filet, filiferous, filiform, filigree, fillet, multifilament, profile, unifilar
fimbriae	fimbri-		fimbria, fimbrial, fimbriate, fimbriation, fimbrillate, fringe
fimus	fim-	dung	fimicolous
fīnis	fīn-	end, limit	affinal, affine, affinitive, affinity, confine, confinement, confines, confinity, define, definiendum, definiens, definite, definition, definitive, equifinality, final, finality, finance, fine, finery, finesse, finis, finish, finite, finito, finitude, indefinite, indefinitude, infinite, infinitesimal, infinitive, infinitude, infinity, nonaffinity, nonfinal, nonfinite, prefinite, raffinate, raffinose, redefine, redefinition, refinance, refine, refinement, refinery, semidefinite, semifinal, superfine, transfinite
firmus	firm-	firm	affirm, affirmance, affirmant, affirmation, affirmative, affirmatory, confirm, confirmation, confirmational, confirmatory, disaffirm, disaffirmation, farm, fermata, firmament, infirm, infirmarian, infirmary, infirmity, nonaffirmation, obfirm, obfirmation, reaffirm, reaffirmation, reconfirm, reconfirmation
fiscus	fisc-	basket	confiscate, confiscation, confiscatory, fisc, fiscal, fiscus
fistula	fistul-	pipe, tube	fistula, fistulate, fistuliform, fistulose, fistulous
flaccus	flacc-	flabby	flaccid, flaccidity
flagrum	flagr-		flagellant, flagellar, flagellate, flagellation, flagelliform, flagellin, flagellum, flail, multiflagellate, uniflagellate
†flagellum	flagell-		flagellant, flagellar, flagellate, flagellation, flagelliform, flagellin, flagellum, flail, multiflagellate, uniflagellate
flamma (Note: for flagma)	flamm-	flame	flamage, flambé, flambeau, flamboyance, flamboyant, inflame, inflammable, inflammation, inflammatory, oriflamme
flavus	flav-	yellow	flavin, flavivirus, flavonoid
floccus	flocc-	tuft	deflocculant, deflocculation, floc, floccillation, floccinaucinihilipilification, floccose, flocculant, floccular, flocculation, floccule, flocculent, floccus, flock
†flocculus	floccul-	tuft	deflocculant, deflocculation, floc, floccillation, floccinaucinihilipilification, floccose, flocculant, floccular, flocculation, floccule, flocculent, floccus, flock
flōs	flōr-	flower	counterflory, deflorate, defloration, effleurage, effloresce, efflorescence, efflorescent, fiori, fioritura, fleur-de-lis, fleury, flora, floral, florescence, florescent, floret, floriculture, florid, floridean, floridity, floriferous, floriform, florilege, florilegium, florin, floruit, florulent, flory, flour, flourish, flower, inflorescence, multiflora, multiflorous, pauciflor, pluriflor, uniflorous
†floscellus	floscell-	flower	counterflory, deflorate, defloration, effleurage, effloresce, efflorescence, efflorescent, fiori, fioritura, fleur-de-lis, fleury, flora, floral, florescence, florescent, floret, floriculture, florid, floridean, floridity, floriferous, floriform, florilege, florilegium, florin, floruit, florulent, flory, flour, flourish, flower, inflorescence, multiflora, multiflorous, pauciflor, pluriflor, uniflorous
focus	foc-	hearth	bifocal, confocal, defuel, focaccia, focal, focus, foyer, fuel, fusillade, multifocal, omnifocal, parfocal, refocus, refuel, trifocal, varifocal
foedus	foeder-		confederate, confederation, federacy, federal, federation
folium	foli-	leaf	bifoliate, bifoliolate, centifolious, cinquefoil, counterfoil, defoliant, defoliate, defoliation, exfoliant, exfoliate, exfoliation, exfoliative, feuilleton, foil, folate, foliage, foliar, foliate, foliation, foliature, folic, foliferous, folio, foliolate, foliole, foliose, foliosity, folivore, folivorous, folivory, multifoil, multifoliate, octofoil, perfoliate, portfolio, quadrifoliate, quadrifolium, quatrefoil, septifolious, trefoil, trifoliate, trifoliolate, trifolium, unifoliate
†foliolum	foliol-	leaflet	bifoliate, bifoliolate, centifolious, cinquefoil, counterfoil, defoliant, defoliate, defoliation, exfoliant, exfoliate, exfoliation, exfoliative, feuilleton, foil, folate, foliage, foliar, foliate, foliation, foliature, folic, foliferous, folio, foliolate, foliole, foliose, foliosity, folivore, folivorous, folivory, multifoil, multifoliate, octofoil, perfoliate, portfolio, quadrifoliate, quadrifolium, quatrefoil, septifolious, trefoil, trifoliate, trifoliolate, trifolium, unifoliate
follis	foll-	bellows	follicle, follicular, follis, folly, fool, foolery
†folliculus	follicul-	bellows	follicle, follicular, follis, folly, fool, foolery
fons	font-	fountain, spring	font, fontal, fontanelle
foris	for-	outdoors	afforest, afforestation, deforest, deforestation, disforest, foreclose, foreign, forensic, forest, forfeit, forum, reforest, reforestation
fōrma	fōrm-	form, shape	biform, biformity, conform, conformable, conformance, conformant, conformity, counterreformation, deform, deformable, deformation, deformity, disinformation, formable, formal, formality, formant, format, formation, formative, formula, formulary, formulation, inform, informal, informality, informant, information, informative, irreformable, malformation, nonconformance, perform, performance, preform, preformat, reform, reformable, reformat, reformation, reformatory, transform, transformable, transformation, transformational, transformative, triform, triformity, uniform, uniformity
†formella	formell-	form, shape	
†formula	formul-	form, shape	
formica	formic-	ant	formic, formicophilia
formus	form-	warm	
fornix	fornic-	vault	fornication, forniciform
fors	fort-	luck	fortuitous, fortuity, fortunate, fortune
fortis	fort-	strong	comfort, effort, force, forcible, forte, fortification, fortify, fortis, fortissimo, fortitude
fovea	fove-	shallow round depression	fovea, foveal, foveole
frāter	frātr-	brother	fraternal, fraternity, fratricide, friar, friary
fraus	fraud-	fraud	defraud, defraudation, fraud, fraudulent
frēnum	frēn-	bridle	frenal, frenate, frenulum, frenum, refrain, refrainment
†frenulum	frenul-	bridle	frenal, frenate, frenulum, frenum, refrain, refrainment
frequēns • frequentior • frequentissimus	frequent-	often	frequency, frequent, frequentation, frequentative, infrequency, infrequent
fretum	fret-	strait	transfretation, transfrete
frīgus	frigor-	cold	frigorific
†frīgusculum	friguscul-	cold	frigorific
frōns, fruns	frond-		frond, frondent, frondescence, frondiferous, frondlet, frondose
frōns	front-	brow, forehead	affront, affrontive, bifront, confront, confrontation, confrontational, effrontery, front, frontage, frontal, frontier, frontispiece, nonconfrontational, nonfrontal, prefrontal, quadrifrons, transfrontier
frustum	frust-	piece	bifrustum, frustule, frustulent, frustulum, frustum
†frustillum	frustill-	piece	bifrustum, frustule, frustulent, frustulum, frustum
†frustulum	frustul-	piece	bifrustum, frustule, frustulent, frustulum, frustum
frutex	frutic-	shrub	frutescence, frutescent, fruticose, fruticulose, suffrutescent, suffruticose, suffruticulose
†fruticulus	fruticul-	shrub	frutescence, frutescent, fruticose, fruticulose, suffrutescent, suffruticose, suffruticulose
frūx	frūg-	fruit	frugal, frugality, frugiferous, frugivore, frugivorous, frumenty, infrugiferous
fulvus • fulvissimus	fulv-	tawny	fulvic, fulvid, fulvous
fūmus	fūm-	smoke	fumacious, fumade, fumage, fumarine, fumarole, fumatorium, fumatory, fume, fumeuse, fumid, fumidity, fumiferous, fumigant, fumigate, fumigation, fumigator, infumate, infumation, perfume, perfumery, suffumigate, suffumigation
fundus	fund-	bottom	cofound, defund, found, foundation, foundational, founder, fund, fundament, fundamental, fundoplication, fundus, profound, profundal, profundity
†fundulus	fundul-	bottom	cofound, defund, found, foundation, foundational, founder, fund, fundament, fundamental, fundoplication, fundus, profound, profundal, profundity
fungus	fung-	mushroom	fungal, fungicidal, fungicide, fungiform, fungus
fūnis	fūn-	rope	funambulatory, funicle, funicular, funiculate, funiform
†fūniculus	fūnicul-	rope	funambulatory, funicle, funicular, funiculate, funiform
fūnus	funer-		funeral, funerary, funerate, funereal
fur	fur-	thief	furuncle
furca	furc-	fork	bifurcation, fourchette, furcate, furcula, furcular, multifurcate, trifurcate, trifurcation
†furcilla	furcill-	fork	bifurcation, fourchette, furcate, furcula, furcular, multifurcate, trifurcate, trifurcation
†furcula	furcul-	fork	bifurcation, fourchette, furcate, furcula, furcular, multifurcate, trifurcate, trifurcation
furtum	furt-	theft	furtive
fuscus • fuscior	fusc-	dark	fuscation, fuscine, fuscous, infuscate, infuscation, obfuscate, obfuscation, subfuscous
fūstis	fūst-	cudgel	fustigate, fustigation
†fusticulus	fusticul-	cudgel	fustigate, fustigation
fūsus	fūs-	spindle	fusain, Fusarium, fusarole, fusee, fuselage, fusilli, fusula, fuze
galbus	galb-	yellow	jaundice
galea	gale-	helmet	galea, galeate, galeiform
galēna	galēn-	lead ore	galena, galenic
gallīna	gallīn-	hen	gallinacean, gallinaceous, gallinule
†gallīnula	gallīnul-	hen	gallinacean, gallinaceous, gallinule
gelu	gel-		congeal, congelation, gel, gelati, gelatin, gelatinous, gelation, gelato, gelée, gelid, gelifluction, gelignite, jellification, jelly
geminus	gemin-	twin	bigeminal, bigeminy, gemel, gemelli, gemelliparous, geminal, geminate, gemination, gemini, gimmal, ingeminate, quadrigeminal, trigeminal, trigeminy
†gemellus	gemell-	twin	bigeminal, bigeminy, gemel, gemelli, gemelliparous, geminal, geminate, gemination, gemini, gimmal, ingeminate, quadrigeminal, trigeminal, trigeminy
gemma	gemm-	bud	gem, gemma, gemmaceous, gemmate, gemmiferous, gemmiform, gemmiparous, gemmulation, gemmule, gemmuliferous
†gemmula	gemmul-	bud	gem, gemma, gemmaceous, gemmate, gemmiferous, gemmiform, gemmiparous, gemmulation, gemmule, gemmuliferous
gena	gen-	cheek	fixigena, gena, genal, librigena
gens	gent-		gens, genteel, gentile, gentility, gentle, gentrice, gentrification, gentry
genū	genū-	knee	genicular, geniculate, geniculation, geniculum, genu, genual, genucubital, genuflect, genuflection, genuflexion
†geniculum	genicul-	knee	genicular, geniculate, geniculation, geniculum, genu, genual, genucubital, genuflect, genuflection, genuflexion
genus	gener-	birth, offspring, creation	congener, congeneric, degenerate, degenerative, engender, gender, general, generality, generate, generation, generational, generative, generator, generatrix, generic, generosity, generous, genre, genuine, genus, intergenerational, intergeneric, regenerate, regenerative, subgenre, subgenus, transgender
germen	germin-	sprout	germ, germane, germicide, germinal, germinate, germination, nongermane, regerminate
gibbus	gibb-	hump	gibbose, gibbosity, gibbous
glaber	glabr-	smooth	glabella, glabellar, glabrate, glabrescent, glabrous
†glabellus	glabell-	smooth	glabella, glabellar, glabrate, glabrescent, glabrous
glacies	glaci-	ice	englacial, glacé, glacial, glaciation, glacier, glacious, glacis, glance, interglacial, interglaciation, postglacial, subglacial, supraglacial
gladius	gladi-	sword	gladiate, gladiator, gladiatory, gladiature, gladiolus
glāns	gland-	acorn	eglandular, eglandulose, gland, glandage, glandar, glandiferous, glandiform, glandivorous, glandopreputial, glandula, glandular, glandule, glanduliferous, glandulose, glans, subglandar
†glandula	glandul-	acorn	eglandular, eglandulose, gland, glandage, glandar, glandiferous, glandiform, glandivorous, glandopreputial, glandula, glandular, glandule, glanduliferous, glandulose, glans, subglandar
glēba, glaeba	glēb-	clod	gleba, glebal, glebe, glebosity
globus	glob-		conglobate, global, globate, globe, globose, globosity, globular, globule, globulin, inglobate
†globulus	globul-		conglobate, global, globate, globe, globose, globosity, globular, globule, globulin, inglobate
glomus	glomer-		agglomerate, agglomeration, agglomerative, glomerate, glomerular, glomerulation, glomerulus, juxtaglomerular
†glomerulus	glomerul-		agglomerate, agglomeration, agglomerative, glomerate, glomerular, glomerulation, glomerulus, juxtaglomerular
gluten	glutin-	glue	agglutinant, agglutinate, agglutination, agglutinative, deglutination, glutelin, gluten, glutinosity, glutinous, nonagglutinative
gracilis • gracilior • gracillimus	gracil-	slender	engrail, engrailment, gracile, gracility
gradus	grad-	step	aggradation, aggradational, aggrade, antegrade, anterograde, centigrade, degradable, degradation, degradational, degrade, degree, digitigrade, gradation, grade, gradient, gradine, gradual, graduality, graduand, graduate, graduation, gree, laterigrade, multigrade, nongraduate, plantigrade, postgraduate, progradation, prograde, retrogradation, retrograde, saltigrade, tardigrade
grandis • grandior • grandissimus	grand-		aggrandise, aggrandisement, grandee, grandeur, grandific, grandiloquent, grandiose, grandiosity, grandioso, grandity, grandmaster
granum	gran-	grain	degranulation, engrain, filigree, garner, garnet, grain, granary, grange, granger, granite, granivore, granivorous, granivory, granular, granularity, granulate, granulation, granule, grenade, grenadier, grogram, grosgrain, ingrain, multigrain, pomegranate
†granulum	granul-	grain	degranulation, engrain, filigree, garner, garnet, grain, granary, grange, granger, granite, granivore, granivorous, granivory, granular, granularity, granulate, granulation, granule, grenade, grenadier, grogram, grosgrain, ingrain, multigrain, pomegranate
grātus • gratissimus	grāt-		aggrace, agree, agreeable, agreeance, agreement, congratulant, congratulate, congratulations, congratulatory, disgrace, grace, graciosity, gracious, gratify, gratification, gratis, gratitude, gratuitous, gratuity, gratulant, gratulate, gratulation, gratulatory
gravis • gravior • gravissimus	grav-	heavy	aggravate, aggravation, degravation, gravamen, grave, gravid, gravida, gravidity, gravitas, gravitate, gravitation, gravitational, gravity, grief, grieve, grievance, grievant, grievous, ingravescence, ingravescent, multigravida, multigravidity, nongravitational, nulligravida, primigravida, reaggravate, supergravity
grex	greg-	flock, herd	aggregate, aggregation, aggregator, congregate, congregation, congregational, desegregate, desegregation, disaggregate, egregious, gregarious, intercongregational, segregate, segregation
grossus • grossior	gross-	thick	engross, engrossment, grocer, grocery, grosgrain, gross
gula	gul-		gula, gular, gullet, gully, subgular
gurges	gurgit-		demigorge, disgorge, disgorgement, engorge, engorgement, gorge, gorgeous, gorget, ingurgitate, ingurgitation, regurgitate, regurgitation
gustus	gust-	taste	disgust, gustatory, gusto, gustoso
gutta	gutt-	drop	gout, gutta, guttate, gutter, guttifer, guttiform
guttur	guttur-	throat	goitre, guttural
hallux	halluc-	big toe	hallucal, hallux
hāmus	hām-	hook	hamate, hamiform, hamular, hamulate, hamulus
†hāmulus	hāmul-	hook	hamate, hamiform, hamular, hamulate, hamulus
harena	haren-	sand	arena, arenaceous, arenite, arenose
hasta	hast-	spear	hasta, hastate, hastatic, hastile
hebes	hebet-	blunt, dull	hebetate, hebetude
hedera	heder-	ivy	Hedera, hederaceous
herba	herb-	grass	herbaceous, herbal, herbarium, herbicide, herbivore, herbivorous, herbivory, non-herbal
hērēs	hērēd-		disinherit, heir, hereditable, hereditament, hereditary, heredity, heritability, heritage, inherit, inheritable, inheritance, inheritor, inheritrix, nonhereditary, noninheritable
hibernus	hibern-		hibernacle, hibernal
hiems	hiem-	winter	hiemal
hircus	hirc-	goat	hircine
homō	homin-	man (human being)	bonhomie, homage, hombre, homicide, hominid, homuncular, homunculus, human, humane, humanitarian, humanity, inhuman, inhumane, inhumanity, Nemo, nonhuman, prehuman, subhuman, superhuman, transhuman
†homunculus	homuncul-	man (human being)	bonhomie, homage, hombre, homicide, hominid, homuncular, homunculus, human, humane, humanitarian, humanity, inhuman, inhumane, inhumanity, Nemo, nonhuman, prehuman, subhuman, superhuman, transhuman
honor	honor-	honor	honorable, honorarium, honorary, honorific
hortus	hort-	garden	cohort, court, courteous, courtesan, courtesy, courtier, curtain, horticulture
hostis	host-	enemy	hostile, hostility
humus	hum-	ground	exhumation, exhume, humate, humation, humic, humiliate, humility, inhumation, inhume
ignis	ign-	fire	igneous, ignite, ignition
imbecillus	imbecile-	weak	imbecile, imbecility
inanis	inan-		
inferus • inferior • infimus	infer- • inferior- • infim-	• lower • lowest	• inferior, inferiority •
inguen	inguin-	groin	inguinal
īnsula	īnsul-	island	insular, insulate, insulation, peninsula, peninsular, isolate, isolation
interus • interior • intimus	inter- • interior- • intim-	• •	entrail, intern, internal, internality • interior • intima, intimacy, intimate, intimation
iocus jocus	joc-	jest	jocular, jocularity, joke
†joculus	jocul-	jest	jocular, jocularity, joke
iūdex jūdex (Note: Contracted from jūs and dicō)	iūdic-	judge	adjudicate, adjudication, adjudicative, adjudicator, adjudicatory, extrajudicial, injudicious, judge, judgement, judgment, judgmental, judicable, judicative, judicator, judicatory, judicature, judicial, judiciary, judicious, nonjudicial, prejudge, prejudgment, prejudice, prejudicial
iugum jugum	iug-	yoke	conjugacy, conjugal, conjugate, conjugation, jugal, jugate, jugular
iūs	iūr-	law, right	abjuration, abjure, conjure, de jure, jurat, juration, juratory, jurisdiction, jury, justice
iuvenis juvenis	juven-	young	junior, juniorate, juniority, juvenile, juvenilia, juvenility, rejuvenate
jejunus	jejun-		jejunal, jejune, jejunity, jejunum
labia	labi-	lip	labial, labium
labor	labor-	toil	collaboration, collaborative, collaborator, elaboration, laboratory, laborious
labrum	labr-	lip	labrose, labrum
lac	lact-	milk	lactate, lactic, lactose
lacrima	lacrim-	tear	lachrymose
lacus	lac-		lacuna, lacustrine, lagoon, lake
lapis	lapid-	stone	dilapidate, lapidary
lassus	lass-		lassitude
latex	latic-	liquid	laticifer
latus	lat-	broad, wide	latifoliate, latitude
latus	later-	side	collateral, lateral
laus	laud-	praise	laud, laudable, Lauds
laxus	lax-	loose	laxity, relax
lenis	leni-	gentle	leniency, lenient, leniment, lenis, lenition, lenitive, lenitude, lenity
lens	lent-	lentil	lens, lenticel, lenticular, lentiform
lentus	lent-		lentic, relent
leo	leon-	lion	leonine
lepus	lepor-	hare	leporid, leporine
levis	lev-	light (weight)	levity, relieve
lēx	lēg-	law	alleged, extralegal, illegal, legal, legality, legislation, legislator, privilege
liber	liber-	free	illiberal, illiberality, liberal, liberality, liberate, liberation, liberator
liber	libr-	book	librarian, library, libretto
libra	libr-	balance, scales	deliberate, deliberation, deliberative, equilibrium, libration
lignum	lign-	wood	ligneous, ligniform, lignin, lignite, lignose
limbus	limb-	edge	limbate, limbic, limbo
limes	limit-		delimit, limes, limit, limitation
linea	line-	line	align, collinear, collineation, linea, lineage, linear, linearity, multicollinearity
lingua	lingu-	tongue	bilingual, bilinguality, bilinguous, collingual, elinguation, interlanguage, language, ligula, ligular, ligule, lingua franca, lingual, linguiform, linguine, multilingual, prelingual, quadrilingual, sublingual, trilingual
†lingula, ligula	lingul-	tongue	bilingual, bilinguality, bilinguous, collingual, elinguation, interlanguage, language, ligula, ligular, ligule, lingua franca, lingual, linguiform, linguine, multilingual, prelingual, quadrilingual, sublingual, trilingual
lira	lir-	furrow	delirament, delirant, delirate, deliration, deliriant, delirifacient, delirious, delirium
littera	litter-	letter	alliteration, alliterative, biliteral, illiteracy, illiterate, literacy, literal, literary, literate, literature, obliterate, obliteration, transliteracy, transliteration, triliteral
locus, stlocus	loc-	place	accouchement, bilocation, bilocular, cislocative, collocation, couch, couchant, dislocate, dislocation, interlocal, lieu, local, locale, locality, locate, location, locative, locator, loculament, locular, locule, loculose, loculus, milieu, multilocal, multilocation, multilocular, nonlocal, quasilocal, relocate, relocation, translocal, translocate, translocation, translocative, trilocular, unilocular
†locellus	locell-	place	accouchement, bilocation, bilocular, cislocative, collocation, couch, couchant, dislocate, dislocation, interlocal, lieu, local, locale, locality, locate, location, locative, locator, loculament, locular, locule, loculose, loculus, milieu, multilocal, multilocation, multilocular, nonlocal, quasilocal, relocate, relocation, translocal, translocate, translocation, translocative, trilocular, unilocular
†loculus	locul-	place	accouchement, bilocation, bilocular, cislocative, collocation, couch, couchant, dislocate, dislocation, interlocal, lieu, local, locale, locality, locate, location, locative, locator, loculament, locular, locule, loculose, loculus, milieu, multilocal, multilocation, multilocular, nonlocal, quasilocal, relocate, relocation, translocal, translocate, translocation, translocative, trilocular, unilocular
longus • longior • longissimus	long-	long	allonge, elongate, elongation, longa, longanimity, longe, longeron, longinquity, longitude, longitudinal, longum, lunge, lungo, oblong, prolong, prolongation, purloin
lūbricus	lūbric-	slippery	lubricant, lubricate, lubrication, lubricator, lubricity, lubricous
lucrum	lucr-	gain, profit	lucrative, lucre, lucrific
†lucellum	lucell-	gain, profit	lucrative, lucre, lucrific
lūmen (Note: Contracted from lucimen)	lūmin-	light	dislimn, enlumine, illuminable, illuminance, illuminant, illuminate, illuminati, illumination, illumine, intraluminal, limn, lumen, luminaire, luminal, luminance, luminant, luminaria, luminary, lumination, lumine, luminescence, luminescent, luminiferous, luminosity, luminous, relumine, subluminal, subluminous, superluminal, transillumination, transluminal, ultraluminous
lūna (Note: Contracted from luc-)	lūn-	Moon	circumlunar, cislunar, demilune, interlunar, interlunation, lunar, lunate, lunatic, lunation, lune, lunette, luniform, lunisolar, mezzaluna, mezzelune, plenilunary, semilunar, sublunar, sublunary, superlunary, translunar
lupus	lup-	wolf	lupine
lūtra	lūtr-	otter	Lutra, lutrine
lutum	lut-	mud	lutaceous, lutite
lux	luc-	light	elucidate, elucidation, elucubrate, elucubration, lucent, lucid, lucidity, Lucifer, luciferous, lucifugal, noctilucent, pellucid, pellucidity, semipellucid, translucency, translucent, translucid, translucidity, translucidus
luxus	lux-	dislocated	luxuriant, luxurious, luxury
†macula	macul-	spot	immaculate, macula, macular, maculate, maculation, maculature, macule, maculose
magister	magistr-	master	maestro, magisterial, magistery, magistracy, magistral, magistrate, magistrature, master, mastery, mistral, quartermaster, remaster
magnus • māior • maximus	magn- • māior- • maxim-	big, great • greater • greatest	magnanimity, magnanimous, magnate, magnificent, magnitude • maestoso, majesty, major, majorate, majordomo, majoritarian, majority, majuscule, mayor, mayoral, mayoralty, semimajor, supermajority • maxim, maximal, maximum
malleus	malle-	hammer	malleability, malleable, mallet
malus • peior • pessimus	mal- • peior- • pessim-	bad • worse • worst	dismal, grand mal, malady, malaise, malevolence, malevolent, malice, malicious, malignancy, malignant, nonmalignant, petit mal, premalignant • impair, impairment, pejoration, pejorative • pessimal
mantum	mant-		dismantle, dismantlement, manta, mantel, mantelet, mantilla, mantle
†mantellum	mantell-		dismantle, dismantlement, manta, mantel, mantelet, mantilla, mantle
manus	manu-	hand	amanuensis, Bimana, bimanous, bimanual, mainour, maintain, manacle, manage, manageable, management, managerial, mandamus, mandate, maneuver, manicure, manifer, manifest, manifestation, manifesto, maniform, maniple, manipulation, manner, manual, manuary, manubrium, manuduction, manufacture, manumission, manumit, manus, manuscript, Quadrumana, quadrumanous
†manicula	manicul-	hand	amanuensis, Bimana, bimanous, bimanual, mainour, maintain, manacle, manage, manageable, management, managerial, mandamus, mandate, maneuver, manicure, manifer, manifest, manifestation, manifesto, maniform, maniple, manipulation, manner, manual, manuary, manubrium, manuduction, manufacture, manumission, manumit, manus, manuscript, Quadrumana, quadrumanous
mare	mar-	sea	marinade, marinate, marine, mariner, maritime, submarine, ultramarine
Mars	marti-	Mars	martial, Martian
māter	mātr-	mother	immaterial, material, materiality, maternal, maternity, matricide, matriculant, matriculate, matrilocal, matrimonial, matrimony, matrix, matron, matter
maturus	matur-	ripe	immature, immaturity, maturant, maturate, maturation, mature, maturescent, maturity, premature
maxilla	maxill-	jaw	hemimaxilla, hemimaxillectomy, intermaxilla, maxillar, maxillary, maxillate, maxillectomy, maxilliferous, maxilliform, maxillula, premaxilla, septomaxilla, submaxilla, supermaxilla, supramaxilla, zygomaxillare
medius	medi-	middle	antemeridian, dimidiate, dimidiation, immediacy, immediate, intermediary, intermediate, intermedio, intermezzo, mean, media, medial, median, mediant, mediation, mediator, mediatrix, mediety, medieval, mediocre, mediocrity, medium, meridian, mezzanine, postmeridian
mel	mell-	honey	melliferous, mellific, mellifluence, mellifluent, mellifluous, melliloquent, mellivorous
membrum	membr-		bimembral, dismember, dismemberment, member, membral, membrane, membranous, nonmember, semimembranous, transmembrane
memor	memor-	mindful	commemorate, commemoration, commemorative, immemorial, memoir, memorabilia, memorability, memorable, memorandum, memorial, memory, remember, remembrance, rememorate
menda	mend-	blemish	emend, emendation
mendicus	mendic-	beggar	mendicant, mendicate, mendication, mendicity
mens	ment-	mind	comment, commentary, dementia, mental, mentality
merus	mer-	pure	mere
mēta	met-	goal	mete
miles	milit-	soldier	militant, military, militate, militia
mīlle	mīll-	thousand	bimillennium, mile, mileage, miliarense, miliaresion, millefeuille, millefiori, millefleur, millennial, millennium, milli-, million, millionaire, millipede, milreis, multimillion, postmillennial, premillennial
millēnī	millēn-	a thousand each	bimillenary, millenarian, millenary, postmillenarian
millēsimus	millēsim-	thousandth	mil, millesimal
mirus	mir-		admirability, admirable, admiration, admirative, admire, marvel, miracle, miraculous, mirage, Miranda, mirative, mirativity, mirror
†miraculum	miracul-		admirability, admirable, admiration, admirative, admire, marvel, miracle, miraculous, mirage, Miranda, mirative, mirativity, mirror
miser • miserior • miserrimus	miser-	wretched	commiserate, commiseration, miser, miserable, misericord, misery
†misellus	misell-	wretched	commiserate, commiseration, miser, miserable, misericord, misery
missa	miss-	Mass	missal, missificate
mitis • mitissimus	mit-		mitigant, mitigate, mitigation
modus	mod-		accommodate, accommodation, accommodative, accommodator, bimodal, bimodality, commode, commodification, commodious, commodity, decommodification, demodulate, demodulation, demodulator, immodest, immodesty, intermodal, intermodulation, modal, modality, mode, model, modern, modernity, modest, modesty, modicum, modification, modify, modiolus, modular, modularity, modulate, modulation, modulator, module, modulo, modulus, multimodal, multimodality, postmodern, postmodernity, Quasimodo, remodel, remodulate, supermodel, trimodal, trimodality, ultramodern, unimodular, unimodularity
†modulus	modul-		
moles	mol-	mass	bimolecular, demolition, mole, molecule
mollis	moll-	soft	emollient, mollient, mollify, mollitude, mollusc, molluscicide, molluscivore, mollusk
mons	mont-	mountain	cismontane, dismount, montage, montane, monticello, monticule, montiform, montigenous, mount, piedmont, submontane, surmount, tramontane, transmontane, ultramontane
†monticellus	monticell-	mountain	cismontane, dismount, montage, montane, monticello, monticule, montiform, montigenous, mount, piedmont, submontane, surmount, tramontane, transmontane, ultramontane
†monticulus	monticul-	mountain	cismontane, dismount, montage, montane, monticello, monticule, montiform, montigenous, mount, piedmont, submontane, surmount, tramontane, transmontane, ultramontane
mora	mor-	delay	demur, demure, demurrage, demurral, moratorium
morbus	morb-	sickness	morbid, morbidity
mors	mort-	death	immortal, immortality, mortal, mortality, mortician, rigor mortis
mortuus	mort-	dead	mortgage, mortuary, morgue, postmortem
mōs	mōr-	custom	immoral, immorality, moral, morale, morality, mores, morigerous, morose, morosity
mucrō	mucrōn-	point	mucro, mucronate, mucronation, mucronulate, mucronule
mūcus	mūc-		mucic, muciferous, muciform, mucigel, mucilage, mucilaginous, mucivore, mucosa, mucous, muculent, submucosa
mulier	muli-	woman	muliebrity, mulierose
multa, mulcta	mult-	penalty	mulct
multus • plūs • plūrimus	mult- • plūr- • plūrim-	many • more • most	multiplex, multiplicity, multitude • nonplus, plural, plurality, pluriform, plus, surplus • plurimal
mūlus	mūl-	mule	mular
mundus	mund-	world	antemundane, demimondaine, demimonde, extramundane, intramundane, mondain, mondaine, mondial, mondo, mundane, mundanity, ultramundane
mūrex	mūric-		murex, muricate, muriculate
muria	muri-	brine	muriate, muriatic
murmur	murmur-		murmur, murmuration, murmurous
†murmurillum	murmurill-		murmur, murmuration, murmurous
mūrus, moerus	mūr-	wall	antemural, immuration, immure, immurement, intramural, murage, mural
mūs	mūr-	mouse	intermuscular, murine, muscular, muscularity, musculature
†mūsculus	mūscul-	mouse	intermuscular, murine, muscular, muscularity, musculature
musca	musc-	fly	Musca, muscarine, Muscicapa, Muscidae, musciform, mosquito
mūscus	mūsc-	moss	
mustus	must-	new	must
mutilus	mutil-		mutilate, mutilation, mutilous
mūtulus	mūtul-	modillion	intermutule, modillion, mutular, mutule
mūtus	mūt-		mute
N–V
Citation form	Declining stem	Meaning	English derivatives
nāpus	nāp-	turnip	neep
nāris	nār-	nostril	internarial, nares, narial, prenarial
nāsus	nās-	nose	intranasal, nasal, nasalance, nasality, nonnasal
nāvis	nāv-	ship	antenave, naval, nave, navicular, navigable, navigate, navy, nonnavigable
†nāvicella	nāvicell-	ship	antenave, naval, nave, navicular, navigable, navigate, navy, nonnavigable
†nāvicula	navicul-	ship	antenave, naval, nave, navicular, navigable, navigate, navy, nonnavigable
nebula	nebul-	cloud	nebula, nebular, nebulizer, nebulous
necesse (Note: Contracted from ne- and cedō)	necess-		necessary, necessitarian, necessitate, necessitude, necessity, nonnecessity
nemus	nem-	grove	nemoral nemorose nemorous
nepōs	nepōt-	nephew	grandnephew, nephew, nepoticide, nepotism
nervus	nerv-		innervate, nerval, nervate, nerve, nervose, nervosity, trinervate
neuter	neutr-	neither	neutral, neutrality, nonneutrality
nīdor	nīdor-		nidor, nidorose
nīdus	nīd-	nest	denidation, niche, nidicolous, nidificate, nidification, nidifugous, nidulant, nidulate
†nidulus	nidul-	nest	denidation, niche, nidicolous, nidificate, nidification, nidifugous, nidulant, nidulate
niger	nigr-	black	denigrate, denigration, denigrative, denigrator, negrita, nigrities, negrito, negritude, nigrescence, nigrescent, nigrine, nigritude
nihil	nihil-	nothing	annihilate, annihilation, annihilator, nihil, nil
nodus	nod-	knot	acnode, crunode, denouement, internodal, internode, nodal, node, nodose, nodosity, nodular, nodule, nodulose, tacnode
†nodulus	nodul-	knot	acnode, crunode, denouement, internodal, internode, nodal, node, nodose, nodosity, nodular, nodule, nodulose, tacnode
nomen	nomin-	name	agnomen, agnominal, agnomination, binomen, binominal, denomination, denominational, denominative, denominator, ignominious, ignominy, interdenominational, multidenominational, multinominal, nominal, nomination, nominative, nominator, nominee, nondenominational, noun, postnominal, praenomen, prenominal, pronominal, pronoun, redenomination, renown, surnominal, trinomen, trinominal
nonageni	nonagen-	ninety each	nonagenarian, nonagenary
nonagesimus	nonagesim-	ninetieth	nonagesimal
nōnus	non-	ninth	nonary, None, noon
norma	norm-	carpenter's square	abnormal, abnormality, denormal, enormity, enormous, nonnormal, nonnormative, norm, normal, normality, normative, seminorm, seminormal, subnormal
noster	nostr-	our	nostrum
novem	novem-	nine	November, novennial
novemdecim	novemdec-	nineteen	novemdecillion
noveni	noven-	nine each	Novena, novenary
novus • novior • novissimus	nov-	new	innovate, innovation, innovational, innovative, innovator, innovatory, nova, novation, novel, novella, novelty, novice, novitiate, renovatable, renovate, renovation, renovative, renovator, supernova
†novellus	novell-	new	innovate, innovation, innovational, innovative, innovator, innovatory, nova, novation, novel, novella, novelty, novice, novitiate, renovatable, renovate, renovation, renovative, renovator, supernova
nox	noct-	night	equinoctial, equinox, noctambulous, noctiluca, noctilucent, noctule, nocturn, nocturnal, nocturnality, nocturne, notturno, seminocturnal, trinoctial
nūbēs	nūb-	cloud	enubilate, enubilous, nuance, nubilose, nubilous, obnubilate
nudus	nud-	naked	denudation, denude, nonnude, nude, nudity, seminude, seminudity
nugae	nug-	trifles	nugacious, nugacity, nugation, nugatory
nūmen	nūmin-	nod	numen, numinous
numerus	numer-	number	denumerable, enumerable, enumerate, enumeration, enumerative, enumerator, equinumerant, equinumerous, innumerable, innumeracy, innumerate, innumerous, nonenumerative, numerable, numeracy, numeral, numerary, numerate, numeration, numerative, numerator, numerical, numero, numerosity, numerous, renumerate, supernumerary
nux	nuc-	nut	enucleate, enucleation, extranuclear, internuclear, intranuclear, nucament, nucellus, nucifer, nuciferine, nuciferous, nuciform, Nucifraga, nucivorous, nuclear, nucleate, nucleation, nucleus, nucleolar, nucleolate, nucleolus
†nucula	nucul-	nut	enucleate, enucleation, extranuclear, internuclear, intranuclear, nucament, nucellus, nucifer, nuciferine, nuciferous, nuciform, Nucifraga, nucivorous, nuclear, nucleate, nucleation, nucleus, nucleolar, nucleolate, nucleolus
octāvus	octav-	eighth	octaval, octave, octavo
octō	oct-	eight	octal, octangular, octavalent, octennial, October, octofid, octopartite, octuped, octuple, octuplet, octuplicate
octōdecim	octodecim-	eighteen	octodecillion, octodecimo
octogeni	octogen-	eighty each	octogenarian, octogenary
octōgēsimus	octogesim-	eightieth	octogesimal
octōni	octon-	eight each	octonary, octonion
oculus	ocul-	eye	binocular, circumocular, inoculation, intraocular, inveigle, ocular, oculus
†ocellus	ocell-	eye	binocular, circumocular, inoculation, intraocular, inveigle, ocular, oculus
odium	odi-	hatred	annoy, ennui, odious, odium
odor	odor-		deodorant, malodor, malodorous, odoriferous, odorous
oleum	ole-	oil	oleose, oleosity, oleum
omen	omin-		abominable, abomination, omen, ominous
omnis	omn-	all	omnibenevolence, omniform, omnipotence, omnipresence, omniscience, omnivore
onus	oner-	burden, load	exonerate, exoneration, onerous, onus
opacus	opac-	shady	opacity, opaque
ops	op-		copious, inopulent, opulence, opulent
opus	oper-	work	chef-d'oeuvre, cooperate, cooperation, cooperative, hors d'oeuvre, inoperable, interoperability, interoperable, inure, inurement, manoeuvre, oeuvre, opera, operability, operable, operand, operant, operate, operation, operational, operative, operator, operose, operosity, opus, opuscule, postoperative, preoperative
†opusculum	opuscul-	work	chef-d'oeuvre, cooperate, cooperation, cooperative, hors d'oeuvre, inoperable, interoperability, interoperable, inure, inurement, manoeuvre, oeuvre, opera, operability, operable, operand, operant, operate, operation, operational, operative, operator, operose, operosity, opus, opuscule, postoperative, preoperative
orbis	orb-	ring	deorbit, orb, orbicle, orbicular, orbiculate, orbit, orbital, postorbital, suborbital, superorbital
†orbiculus	orbicul-	ring	deorbit, orb, orbicle, orbicular, orbiculate, orbit, orbital, postorbital, suborbital, superorbital
ordo	ordin-	order	coordinal, coordinate, coordination, disorder, extraordinary, incoordinate, incoordination, infraorder, inordinate, inordination, insubordinate, insubordination, ordain, ordainment, order, ordinal, ordinance, ordinary, ordinate, ordination, ordinative, ordnance, ornery, parvorder, preordain, preorder, preordination, quasiorder, reordain, reorder, reordination, suborder, subordinate, subordination, superordain, superorder, superordinate, superordination
os	or-	mouth	adorable, adoral, adoration, adore, adosculation, exorable, inexorable, inosculate, inosculation, interosculate, intraoral, oral, oration, orator, oratorio, oratory, orifice, oscitate, oscitation, osculant, oscular, oscularity, osculate, osculation, osculator, osculatory, osculatrix, oscule, osculum
†osculum	oscul-	mouth	adorable, adoral, adoration, adore, adosculation, exorable, inexorable, inosculate, inosculation, interosculate, intraoral, oral, oration, orator, oratorio, oratory, orifice, oscitate, oscitation, osculant, oscular, oscularity, osculate, osculation, osculator, osculatory, osculatrix, oscule, osculum
os	oss-	bone	exossation, interosseous, osseous, ossicle, ossicular, ossiferous, ossification, ossifrage, ossify, ossuary
†ossiculum	ossicul-	bone	exossation, interosseous, osseous, ossicle, ossicular, ossiferous, ossification, ossifrage, ossify, ossuary
ōscen	ōscin-	songbird	oscine
ostium	osti-		ostiary, ostiolar, ostiole, ostium
†ostiolum	ostiol-		ostiary, ostiolar, ostiole, ostium
otium	oti-	leisure	negotiable, negotiate, negotiation, nonnegotiable, otiose, otiosity, renegotiate, renegotiation
ovis	ov-	sheep	ovile, ovine
†ovicula	ovicul-	sheep	ovile, ovine
ovum	ov-	egg	oval, ovarian, ovary, ovicapsule, ovicidal, ovicide, oviduct, oviferous, oviform, oviposition, ovipositor, ovolo, ovular, ovulation, ovulatory, ovule, ovum, pluriovulate
†ovulum	ovul-	egg	oval, ovarian, ovary, ovicapsule, ovicidal, ovicide, oviduct, oviferous, oviform, oviposition, ovipositor, ovolo, ovular, ovulation, ovulatory, ovule, ovum, pluriovulate
pagus	pag-		pagan, paisano, peasant, peasantry
pala	pal-	spade	palette
palatum	palat-	roof of the mouth	impalatable, palatability, palatable, palatal, palate
palla	pall-	covering, cloak	circumpallial, pall, pallial, palliate, palliative, pallium
pālus	pāl-	stake	impale, impalement, pale, palisade, pole, travail
pălus	palūd-	marsh	paludose
paluster	palustr-		palustral, palustrine
panis	pan-	bread	accompaniment, accompany, appanage, companion, company, empanada, impanate, pannier, pantry
pannus	pann-		empanel, impanel, pane, panel, repanel, subpanel
panus	pan-		panicle
†panicula	panicul-		panicle
papaver	papaver-	poppy	papaveraceous, papaverine
papilio	papilion-	butterfly	pavilion
par	par-	equal	comparative, comparator, disparage, disparagement, parity, disparity, impar, imparity, nonpareil, pair, par, parile, parity, peer, peerage, subpar, umpire
parcus	parc-		parcity
paries	pariet-	wall	biparietal, parietal
pars	part- -pert-	piece	apart, apartment, apportion, apportionment, bipartient, bipartisan, bipartite, bipartition, champerty, compart, compartition, compartment, compartmental, coparcenary, coparcener, counterpart, counterparty, depart, department, departmental, departure, dispart, disproportionate, equipartition, ex parte, impart, impartial, intraparty, jeopardous, jeopardy, multipartite, nonpartisan, parcel, parcenary, parcener, parse, partial, partiality, participate, participle, particle, particular, particularity, particulate, partisan, partita, partite, partition, partitive, partner, party, passel, portion, proportion, proportional, proportionality, purpart, purparty, quadripartite, reapportion, reapportionment, repartee, repartition, superparticular, tripartient, tripartite, unipartite
†particella	particell-	piece	
†particula	particul-	piece	
parvus • minor • minimus	parv- • min- • minim-	small • less • least	parvifoliate, parvity, parvovirus • administer, administration, administrative, administrator, administratrix, maladminister, minister, ministerial, ministrant, ministrative, ministry, minor, minority, minstrel, minstrelsy, minus, minuscule, semiminor • minim, minimal, minimum
passer	passer-	sparrow	passerine
passus	pass-		compass, encompass, pace, passage, passant, passement, passementerie, passenger
pater	patr-	father	Jupiter, paternal, paternity, patrician, patrilineal, patrilocal, patrilocality, patrimonial, patrimony, patron, patronage, perpetrate, repatriation
paucus	pauc-	few	paucal, pauciloquent, paucity, poco
pauper	pauper-		impoverish, impoverishment, pauperage, poor, poverty
pausa	paus- pos-		compose, composure, counterpose, counterproposal, disposable, disposal, dispose, disposure, exposal, expose, exposé, exposure, imposable, impose, imposure, interposal, interpose, multipurpose, opposable, opposal, oppose, posada, pose, poseur, poseuse, predispose, proposal, propose, purpose, reimpose, reposal, repose, repurpose, supposal, suppose, transposable, transposal, transpose
pavo	pavon-	peacock	pavone, pavonine
pax	pac-	peace	appease, appeasement, copayment, pacific, pacify, pay, payment, repay, repayment
pectus	pector-	chest	pectoral
pecu	pecu-		impecunious, peculiar, pecuniary
penna	penn-	feather	pen, pennage, pennate, penniform, pennigerous, pennon
perca	perc-	perch	Perca, Percidae, perciform, percoid, Percoidea
persona	person-	person	impersonate, impersonation, impersonator, person, personable, personage, personal, personality, personification, subpersonality, transpersonal
pēs	ped-	foot	biped, bipedal, expedient, expedite, expedition, impeach, impeachment, impediment, inexpedient, oppidum, pawn, pedal, pedestal, pedestrian, pedicel, pedicle, pedicure, pediform, pedigerous, pedigree, peon, peonage, piedfort, piedmont, pioneer, quadruped, quadrupedal, tripedal
†pediculus	pedicul-	foot	biped, bipedal, expedient, expedite, expedition, impeach, impeachment, impediment, inexpedient, oppidum, pawn, pedal, pedestal, pedestrian, pedicel, pedicle, pedicure, pediform, pedigerous, pedigree, peon, peonage, piedfort, piedmont, pioneer, quadruped, quadrupedal, tripedal
pestis	pest-	pest	pesticide, pestiferous, pestilence
pila	pil-	ball	pellet, pelota, peloton, pill
†pilula	pilul-	ball	pellet, pelota, peloton, pill
pileus	pile-	cap	Pilea, pileate, pileum, pileus
pilus	pil-	hair	depilation, depilatory, epilation, piliferous, piliform, pilose, pilosity
pinna	pinn-	feather	panache, pinnacle, pinnal, pinnate, pinniform, pinniped
†pinnaculum	pinnacul-	feather	panache, pinnacle, pinnal, pinnate, pinniform, pinniped
pinus	pin-		pine, pineal
pirus	pir-	pear	piriform
piscis	pisc-	fish	pisces, pisciform, piscine, piscivore
pius	pi-	dutiful	piety, pious, pittance, pity
pix	pic-		Picea, picene, piceous, pitch
planca	planc-	plank	planch
planta	plant-	sole	implant, implantable, implantation, plant, plantar, plantation, plantigrade, supplant, supplantation, transplant, transplantation
planus	plan-	flat	applanate, applanation, complanar, complanate, coplanar, coplanarity, esplanade, explain, explanation, explanatory, piano, pianoforte, plain, plaintext, planar, planary, planate, planation, plane
platea	plate-	place	displace, displacement, emplacement, piazza, placement, plaza, replace, replacement, transplace
plēbs	pleb-	common people	plebeian, plebiscite, plebs
plenus	plen-	full	plenary, plenipotent, plenipotentiary, plenish, plenishment, plenitude, plenitudinous, plenum
plūma	plūm-	feather	deplumation, deplume, displume, plumage, plume, plumose, plumosity, plumulaceous, plumular, plumule, plumulose, semiplume, superplume
†plūmula	plūmul-	feather	deplumation, deplume, displume, plumage, plume, plumose, plumosity, plumulaceous, plumular, plumule, plumulose, semiplume, superplume
plumbum	plumb-	lead	plumb, plumbaginous, plumbago, plumbeous, plummet, plunge, replumb
pluvia	pluvi-	rain	compluvium, displuviate, impluvium, plover, pluvial, pluviosity
pōculum	pōcul-	cup	poculent, poculiform
†pōcillum	pōcill-	cup	poculent, poculiform
pollen	pollin-		polenta, pollen, pollinate, pollination, pollinator, polliniferous
pollex	pollic-	thumb	pollex, pollical, pollicate, prepollex
pondus	ponder-	weight	imponderable, ponder, ponderable, ponderance, ponderation, ponderosa, ponderosity, ponderous, pound, preponderance, preponderate
pons	pont-	bridge	pons, pontage, pontic, pontile, pontine, pontonier, pontoon, punt
populus	popul-		depopulate, depopulation, people, populace, popular, popularity, populate, population, pueblo, repopulate, repopulation, subpopulation
†popellus	popell-		depopulate, depopulation, people, populace, popular, popularity, populate, population, pueblo, repopulate, repopulation, subpopulation
pōpulus	pōpul-	poplar	populetum, Populus
porca, porcus	porc-	pig	porcine, porcupine, pork
porta	port-	gate	anteporch, anteport, anteportico, porch, portal, portcullis, portico, portière
†portula	portul-	gate	anteporch, anteport, anteportico, porch, portal, portcullis, portico, portière
portus	port-		importune, importunity, opportune, opportunity, port
posterus • posterior • postremus	poster- • posterior- • postrem-	• •	posterity • a posteriori, posterior, posteriority • postremogeniture
potis	pot-		compossible, idempotence, idempotent, impossible, impotence, impotency, impotent, nilpotence, nilpotent, posse, possible, potence, potency, potent, potentate, potential, potentiality, puissance, puissant, subpotency, superpotency, superpotential, unipotent
prandium	prandi-	lunch	prandial, preprandial
pravus	prav-	crooked	depravity
pretium	preti-	price	appreciate, appreciation, depreciation, precious
prex	prec-	prayer	preces
prior • prīmus	prior- • prīm-	former • first	a priori, prior, priority, priory, subprior • prima facie, primacy, primal, primary, primate, prime, primer, primine, primitive, primogeniture, primordial, primrose, Primula, subprimal, subprime
privus	priv-	own	privacy, private, privy
probrum	probr-		opprobrium
probus	prob-		approbation, approval, approve, improbability, improbable, probability, probable, proband, probate, probation, probationary, probative, probity, reprobate, reproval
prope • propior • proximus	prop- • propior- • proxim-	near, nigh • nearer • nearest	propinquity, propitiation, propitiatory, propitious • approach, rapprochement, reproach • proximal, proximate, proximity
proprius	propri-	proper	appropriate, appropriation, impropriety, inappropriate, propriety
prunus	prun-	plum	prune
publicus	public-		public, publican, publication, publicity
puer	puer-	boy	puerile, puerility, puerperant
pulcher	pulchr-	beautiful	pulchritude, pulchritudinous
pullus	pull-		poultry, pullet, pullorum, pullulate, pullulation, repullulate, repullulation
†pullulus	pullul-		poultry, pullet, pullorum, pullulate, pullulation, repullulate, repullulation
pulmo	pulmon-	lung	extrapulmonary, intrapulmonary, pulmonary
pulvinus	pulvin-	cushion, pillow	pulvilli, pulvinar, pulvinated, pulvinus
pulvis	pulver-	dust, powder	pulverize, pulverulence, pulverulent
pumex	pumic-	pumice stone	pumicate, pumice, pumiceous, pumiciform, pumicite
pupa	pup-	doll	pupae, pupal, puparium, pupation, pupil
purus	pur-	pure	depurate, depuration, impure, impurity, pure, purification, purity
pus	pur-	pus	purulence, purulent
quadrageni	quadragen-	forty each	quadragenarian, quadragenary
quadrāgēsimus	quadrāgēsim-	fortieth	Quadragesima, quadragesimal
quadrāgintā	quadrāgint-	forty	quarantine
quadrini	quadrin-	four each	carillon, carillonneur, quadrin
quadrum, quadrus	quadr-	square	biquadrate, biquadratic, cadre, conquadrate, escadrille, intrasquad, quadrance, quadrate, quadratic, quadratrix, quadrature, quadrel, quadric, quadrille, quarry, squad, squadron, squarable, square, subsquadron
†quadrellus	quadrell-	square	biquadrate, biquadratic, cadre, conquadrate, escadrille, intrasquad, quadrance, quadrate, quadratic, quadratrix, quadrature, quadrel, quadric, quadrille, quarry, squad, squadron, squarable, square, subsquadron
quartus	quart-	fourth	inquartation, interquartile, quadroon, quart, quartal, quartan, quartary, quarter, quartet, quartic, quartile, quartine, quarto, semiquartile
quaternī	quatern-	four each	biquaternion, quatern, quaternary, quaternate, quaternion, quaternity, quire
quattuor	quadr-	four	quadrangle, quadrennial, quadriceps, quadrifarious, quadrifid, quadrifolium, quadrifrons, quadrilateral, quadrilingual, quadriliteral, quadrillion, quadrinational, quadrinodal, quadrinomial, quadrinominal, quadripara, quadrireme, quadrisection, quadrivalent, quadrivium, quadruped, quadruple, quadruplet, quadruplex, quadruplicate, quatrain, quatre, quatrefoil
quattuordecim	quattuordecim-	fourteen	quatorzain, quatorze, quattuordecillion
quiēs	quiēt-	rest	acquiesce, acquiescence, acquiescent, acquit, acquittal, acquittance, inquietude, quiescence, quiescent, quiet, quietude, quietus, quit, requiem, requiescat, requital, requite, requitement
quīndecim	quīndecim-	fifteen	quindecennial, quindecillion, quindecimal, quindecimvir, quinzaine, quinze
quindēni	quindēn-	fifteen each	quindenary
quingēnī, quingentēnī	quingēn-	five hundred each	quingenary
quīnī	quīn-	five each	biquinary, quinarius, quinary, quinate
quinquageni	quinquagen-	fifty each	quinquagenarian, quinquagenary
quintus	quint-	fifth	biquintile, quint, quinta, quintal, quintan, quintant, quinte, quintessence, quintessential, quintic, quintile, quintipara, quintus, semiquintile
radius	radi-	ray, spoke	biradial, circumradius, interradial, irradiance, irradiate, irradiation, multiradial, nonradiative, nonradioactive, radial, radian, radiance, radiant, radiation, radiator, radio, radioactive, radioactivity, radius, raion, ray, semiradial, transradial
rādīx	rādīc-	root	biradical, deracinate, deracination, eradicable, eradicate, radical, radicand, radicant, radicate, radicel, radicle, radicular, radicule, radiculose, radish, ultraradical
†radicula	radicul-	root	biradical, deracinate, deracination, eradicable, eradicate, radical, radicand, radicant, radicate, radicel, radicle, radicular, radicule, radiculose, radish, ultraradical
rāmus	rām-	branch	biramous, ramada, ramage, ramal, ramate, ramification, ramiform, ramon, ramose, ramosity, ramulose, ramulus, ramus, ramuscule, uniramous
†rāmulus	rāmul-	branch	biramous, ramada, ramage, ramal, ramate, ramification, ramiform, ramon, ramose, ramosity, ramulose, ramulus, ramus, ramuscule, uniramous
rāna	rān-	frog	ranula, ranunculaceous, ranunculus
†rānula	rānul-	frog	ranula, ranunculaceous, ranunculus
†rānunculus	rānuncul-	frog	ranula, ranunculaceous, ranunculus
rāpa, rāpum	rāp-	turnip	rape, ravioli
†rāpulum	rāpul-	turnip	rape, ravioli
remus	rem-	oar	bireme, quadrireme, quinquereme, remex, remiform, remiges, remigial, remiped, sexireme, trireme
rēn	ren-	kidney	adrenal, renal, reniform
res	re-	thing	irrealis, real, reality, surreal
rete	ret-	net	reticle, reticular, reticulate, reticulation, reticule, retiform, retina
†reticulum	reticul-	net	reticle, reticular, reticulate, reticulation, reticule, retiform, retina
rēx	rēg-	king	interregnum, regal, regalia, regality, regency, regent, regicide, regious, reguline, reign, royal, viceroy
†regulus	regul-	king	interregnum, regal, regalia, regality, regency, regent, regicide, regious, reguline, reign, royal, viceroy
ripa	rip-	bank	arrival, arrive, arrivé, riparian, river, riverine, riviera, transriverine
ritus	rit-	rite	ritual
rivus	riv-	brook	corrival, corrivation, derivation, derivative, derive, nonrivalrous, rival, rivality, rivalrous, rivalry, rivose, rivulet, Rivulus
†rivulus	rivul-	brook	corrival, corrivation, derivation, derivative, derive, nonrivalrous, rival, rivality, rivalrous, rivalry, rivose, rivulet, Rivulus
rōbor	rōbor-	oak	corroborant, corroborate, corroboration, corroborative, corroborator, robust
rōs	rōr-	dew	irrorate, irroration
rosa	ros-	rose	primrose, rosacea, rosaceous, rosarian, rosarium, rosary, rosé, roseola, rosette, rosulate, sub rosa
†rosula	rosul-	rose	primrose, rosacea, rosaceous, rosarian, rosarium, rosary, rosé, roseola, rosette, rosulate, sub rosa
rōstrum	rōstr-	beak, prow	brevirostrate, curvirostral, lamellirostral, rostellate, rostelliform, rostellum, rostral, rostrate, rostriform, rostrulum, rostrum
†rostellum	rostell-	beak, prow	brevirostrate, curvirostral, lamellirostral, rostellate, rostelliform, rostellum, rostral, rostrate, rostriform, rostrulum, rostrum
†rostrulum	rostrul-	beak, prow	brevirostrate, curvirostral, lamellirostral, rostellate, rostelliform, rostellum, rostral, rostrate, rostriform, rostrulum, rostrum
rota	rot-	wheel	circumrotation, contrarotation, rondeau, rondel, rondo, rotary, rotation, rotational, rotelle, rotifer, Rotifera, rotiferous, rotiform, rotula, rotund, rotunda, rotundifolious, rotundity, roulette, round, roundel, rowel
†rotella	rotell-	wheel	circumrotation, contrarotation, rondeau, rondel, rondo, rotary, rotation, rotational, rotelle, rotifer, Rotifera, rotiferous, rotiform, rotula, rotund, rotunda, rotundifolious, rotundity, roulette, round, roundel, rowel
†rotula	rotul-	wheel	circumrotation, contrarotation, rondeau, rondel, rondo, rotary, rotation, rotational, rotelle, rotifer, Rotifera, rotiferous, rotiform, rotula, rotund, rotunda, rotundifolious, rotundity, roulette, round, roundel, rowel
ruber	rubr-	red	erubescence, erubescent, rubella, Rubio, rubious, rubric, rubricate, rubrication, rubricator, ruby
†rubellus	rubell-	red	erubescence, erubescent, rubella, Rubio, rubious, rubric, rubricate, rubrication, rubricator, ruby
rūdis	rūd-	rude	erudiate, erudite, erudition, rudiment, rudimentary, rudity
rūdus	rūder-	rubbish	ruderal
rūfus	rūf-	red	rufescence, rufescent, rufous
ruga	rug-	wrinkle	arroyo, corrugant, corrugate, corrugation, erugate, rugose
rūmen	rūmin-	throat	rumen, rumenic, ruminal, ruminant, ruminate, rumination, ruminator
rūpēs	rūp-	crag, rock	rupestrine, rupicolous
rūs	rūr-	countryside, farm	nonrural, roister, roisterous, rural, rustic, rusticate, rustication, rusticity
sacer	sacr- -secr-	sacred	consecrate, consecration, deconsecration, desecration, desecrator, execrable, execrate, execration, inexecrable, obsecrate, reconsecrate, sacrament, sacrifice, sacrificial, sacrilege, sacrilegious, sacristy, sacrosanct, saint, sanctimony, sanction, Sanctus, Tersanctus
saeculum	saecul-		nonsecular, secular, secularity
saepēs	saep-	hedge	septal, septarium, septate, septiform, septifragal, septulate, septulum, septum, transept, transeptal, uniseptate
saeta, sēta	saet-	bristle	searce, seta, setaceous, setal, setaria, setiferous, setiform, setigerous, setireme, setose
†saetula	saetul-	bristle	searce, seta, setaceous, setal, setaria, setiferous, setiform, setigerous, setireme, setose
sagina	sagin-	fatten	saginate, sagination
sal	sal-	salt	desalinate, desalination, salami, salary, saline, salinity, salsa, sauce, saucisson, sausage
sanguis	sanguin-	blood	consanguineous, sangfrois, sanguinaceous, sanguinary, sanguine
sanus	san-	sound	insane, insanity, sanatorium, sane, sanity
saxum	sax-	rock	saxatile, saxicavous, saxicoline, saxifrage, saxifragous
sēdecim	sēdecim-	sixteen	sedecimal
sēdēnī	sēdēn-	sixteen each	sedenion
semen	semin-	seed	disseminate, dissemination, disseminative, disseminator, disseminule, inseminate, insemination, semen, seminal, seminar, seminarian, seminary, seminiferous, seminific, seminivorous, seminose
semis	semi-	half	semiannual, semicolon, semiconductor, semiconscious, seminatural
senex	sen-	old man	senate, senator, senile, senility, senior, seniority
seni	sen-	six each	senary
septem	sept-	seven	septangular, September, septemfid, septemfluous, septemvir, septennial, septifarious, septilateral, septinsular, septireme, septivalent, septuple, septuplet, septuplicate
septeni	septen-	seven each	septenary
septimus	septim-	seventh	septimal, septime
sex	sex-	six	semester, sexangle, sexangular, sexavalent, sexennial, sexennium, sexireme, sexivalent, sexpartite, sexradiate, sextain, sextuple, sextuplet
sexageni	sexagen-	sixty each	sexagenarian, sexagenary
sexagesimus	sexagesim-	sixtieth	sexagesimal
sextus	sext-	sixth	bissextile, bissextus, semisextile, sestet, sestina, Sext, sextain, sextan, sextans, sextant, sextary, sextic, sextile, sextillion, siesta, sixte
†sextula	sextul-	sixth	bissextile, bissextus, semisextile, sestet, sestina, Sext, sextain, sextan, sextans, sextant, sextary, sextic, sextile, sextillion, siesta, sixte
sibilus	sibil-	hiss	assibilate, assibilation, persiflage, sibilance, sibilant, sibilate, sibilation, sibilous
siccus • siccior	sicc-	dry	demi-sec, desiccant, desiccation, exsiccant, exsiccate, exsiccation, exsiccator, exsiccatum, sec, siccant, siccation, siccative, siccific
sidus	sider-	constellation	consider, considerable, considerate, consideration, desiderate, desideration, desiderative, desideratum, desideria, desirability, desirable, desire, Desiree, inconsiderable, inconsiderate, inconsideration, reconsider, reconsideration, sidereal
signum	sign-	mark, sign	adsignify, assign, assignable, assignat, assignation, assignee, assignment, consign, consignable, consignation, consignee, consignment, cosign, cosignatory, countersign, countersignal, countersignature, design, designate, designation, designative, designator, designatory, designee, ensign, insignia, insignificance, insignificant, nonsignatory, re-sign, reassign, reassignment, redesign, redesignate, redesignation, reseal, resealable, resign, resignation, sain, seal, sealable, sealant, sigil, sigillary, sigillate, sigla, sign, signaculum, signage, signal, signalment, signate, signation, signatory, signature, signee, signet, significance, significant, signification, significative, significavit, signum
†sigillum	sigill-	mark, sign	
silva	silv-	forest	sylvan, silviculture
similis	simil-	like	assimilate, assimilation, similar, similarity, simile, similitude, verisimilitude
sincerus	sincer-		insincere, insincerity, sincere, sincerity
singulus	singul-	one each	single, singularity, singulation, singulative
sinister	sinistr-	left	sinister, sinistral
sinus	sinu-	curve	insinuation, sine, sinus, sinuose, sinuosity, sinuous
soccus	socc-	slipper	sock
†socculus	soccul-	slipper	sock
socius, socia	soci-		associate, association, associative, consociate, consociation, consociational, disassociate, disassociation, dissociable, dissocial, dissociate, dissociation, dissociative, interassociation, nonassociative, sociability, sociable, social, sociality, sociative, societal, society
sol	sol-	sun	circumsolar, extrasolar, insolate, insolation, solar, solarium, soliform, soliscence, solstice, subsolar
solidus	solid-		nonsolid, quasisolid, semisolid, sol, solder, soldier, soldiery, soldo, solid, solidarity, solidary, solidification, solidity, solidus, sou
solium	soli-	seat	soil, soilure, subsoil
solum, solea	sol-	bottom	aridisol, entresol, inceptisol, insole, sole, soleus, solifluxion, solum
solus	sol-	alone, only	desolate, desolation, desolatory, saudade, sole, soliloquy, solitaire, solitary, solitude, solitudinarian, solitudinous, solivagous, solo, sullen
somnium	somni-	dream	somnial
somnus	somn-	sleep	insomnia, somnifacient, somniferous, somnific, somniloquy, somnolent
sonus	son-	sound	absonant, ambisonic, assonance, assonant, assonate, consonance, consonant, consonous, dissonance, dissonant, inconsonance, inconsonant, infrasonic, infrasound, resonance, resonant, resonate, resound, sonance, sonant, sonnet, sonorant, sonority, soun, sound, subsonic, supersonic, triconsonantal, ultrasonic, ultrasound, unison, unisonal, unisonant, unisonous
sopor	sopor-	deep sleep	sopor, soporific
soror	soror-	sister	cousin, sororal, sororate, sororicide, sorority
sors	sort-	lot	consort, consortial, consortium, sort, sortition, subsort
†sorticula	sorticul-	lot	consort, consortial, consortium, sort, sortition, subsort
spatium	spati-	space	interspace, interspatial, space, spatial, spatiate, subspace
spēs	spēr-	hope	despair, desperado, desperate, desperation, esperance, prosper, prosperity, prosperous
spica	spic-	ear of grain	spica, spicate, spicose, spicosity, spicular, spiculate, spicule, spiculiform
†spiculum	spicul-	ear of grain	spica, spicate, spicose, spicosity, spicular, spiculate, spicule, spiculiform
spina	spin-	thorn	infraspinate, infraspinatus, interspinal, spinal, spine, spinel, spinescent, spiniferous, spiniform, spinose, spinous
spūma	spūm-	foam	despumate, despumation, spoom, spumante, spume
squāma	squām-	scale	desquamate, desquamation, desquamative, squamate, Squamella, squamiform, squamosal, squamose, squamous, squamule, squamulose, subsquamosal, supersquamosal
†squāmula	squāmul-	scale	desquamate, desquamation, desquamative, squamate, Squamella, squamiform, squamosal, squamose, squamous, squamule, squamulose, subsquamosal, supersquamosal
squarrōsus	squarrōs-		squarrose, squarrulose
squātina	squātin-	angel shark	Squatina
stagnum	stagn-		restagnant, restagnate, restagnation, stagnancy, stagnant, stagnate, stagnation
stella (Note: for sterula)	stell-	star	circumstellar, constellation, interstellar, quasistellar, stellar, stellate, stellation, stelliferous, stelliform, stellula, stellular, substellar
sterilis	steril-		nonsterile, sterilant, sterile, sterility
stilus (Note: Contracted from stiglus)	stil-		stiletto, stiliform, style, stylet, stylus
stimulus	stimul-		costimulation, costimulatory, stimulate, stimulation, stimulative, stimulator, stimulus
stipes	stipit-		etiolate, etiolation, exstipulate, instipulate, stipe, stipel, stipellate, stipes, stipitate, stipitiform, stipular, stipule, stubble
†stipella	stipell-		etiolate, etiolation, exstipulate, instipulate, stipe, stipel, stipellate, stipes, stipitate, stipitiform, stipular, stipule, stubble
†stipula	stipul-		etiolate, etiolation, exstipulate, instipulate, stipe, stipel, stipellate, stipes, stipitate, stipitiform, stipular, stipule, stubble
stips	stip-		stipend
stiria	stiri-	drop	distill, distilland, distillate, distillation, distillery, stillatitious, stillatory
†stilla	still-	drop	distill, distilland, distillate, distillation, distillery, stillatitious, stillatory
stirps	stirp-		extirpate, extirpation
strēnuus	strenu-		strenuity, strenuous
stria	stri-	furrow	extrastriate, striate, striation, striatum, striature
strix	strig-	owl	strigine, Strix
stuppa	stupp-	tow	stupeous, stupose
stuprum	stupr-		constuprate, constupration
suavis	suav-	sweet	assuage, assuagement, suave, suaviloquent, suaviloquy, suavity
sucus succus	succ-	juice	exsuccous, succulence, succulent
sulcus	sulc-	furrow	bisulcate, bisulcous, sulcal, sulcate, sulcation, sulciform, sulcus, trisulcate
superus • superior • supremus, summus	super- • superior- • suprem-, sum-	over • higher • highest	insuperable, superable • superior, superiority • consummate, sum, summa, summation, summit, summitry, summity, supreme, supremity, supremum
supīnus	supin-		resupinate, resupination, resupine, supinate, supination, supinator, supine, supinity
sūra	sur-	calf	sural
surdus	surd-	deaf	absurd, absurdity, surd
sūrus	sur-	branch	surculate, surculose
†sūrculus	surcul-	branch	surculate, surculose
sūs	su-	sow	suid, Suidae
susurrus	susurr-	whisper	susurrant, susurrate, susurration, susurrous
taberna	tabern-		tabernacle, tabernacular, tavern
tabernaculum	tabernacul-		tabernacle, tabernacular, tavern
tabes	tab-		tabefaction, tabes, tabescence, tabescent, tabid
tabula	tabul-	board	tabellion, table, tablet, tabular, tabulate, tabulation, tabulator
†tabella	tabell-	board	tabellion, table, tablet, tabular, tabulate, tabulation, tabulator
taedium	taedi-		tediosity, tedium
tardus	tard-	slow	retard, retardation, tardy
templum	templ-	temple	templar, template
tempus	tempor-	time	contemporaneous, contemporary, extemporaneous, tempest, tempo, temporal, temporaneous, temporary
tenuis	tenu-	thin	attenuant, attenuate, attenuation, attenuator, extenuate, extenuation, tenuate, tenuifolious, tenuis, tenuity, tenuous
terminus	termin-	boundary	coterminous, determinable, determinant, determinate, determination, determinative, determinator, determine, exterminate, extermination, indeterminable, indeterminate, interminable, terminal, terminate, termination, terminative, terminator
terni	tern-	three each	tern, ternary, ternate, ternion
terra	terr-	dry land, earth	atterration, circumterrestrial, disinter, disinterment, extraterrestrial, extraterritorial, extraterritoriality, inter, interment, parterre, reinter, reinterment, souterrain, subterrane, subterranean, terrace, terracotta, terrain, terran, terrane, terraqueous, terrarium, terrene, terreplein, terrestrial, terricolous, terrier, terrigenous, territorial, territoriality, territory, terroir, tureen
tertius	terti-	third	sesquitertian, sesterce, subtertian, Terce, tercet, tercine, tertial, tertian, tertiary, tertiate, tierce
testis	test-	witness	attest, attestable, attestation, attestator, contest, contestable, contestant, contestation, counter-protest, detest, detestable, detestation, incontestability, incontestable, intestable, intestacy, intestate, obtest, obtestation, protest, Protestant, protestation, protestator, testacy, testament, testamentary, testamur, testate, testation, testator, testatrix, testicle, testicond, testicular, testiculate, testimonial, testimonium, testimony
titulus	titul-	title	disentitle, disentitlement, entitle, entitlement, intertitle, nontitle, retitle, subtitle, tilde, titular, titulary, titulus
tōtus	tōt-	all, whole	factotum, subtotal, total, totality, totipotent
trēs	tri-	three	trammel, trellis, trey, triangle, triceps, triennial, trillion, triolet, triple, triplet, triplicate, triquetra, triquetrous, triradiate, trireme, triumvirate, trivia
tribus	trib-		attributable, attribute, attribution, attributive, contribute, contribution, contributive, contributor, contributory, deattribute, deattribution, distributable, distributary, distribute, distribution, distributive, distributor, equidistribution, intertribal, nondistributive, redistribute, redistribution, retribute, retribution, retributive, subtribe, tribal, tribe, tribunal, tribune, tributary, tribute
tricae	tric-	tricks	extricable, extricate, extrication, inextricable, intricacy, intricate, intrigant, intrigue, treacherous, treachery, trickery
trīgēsimus	trīgēsim-	thirtieth	trigesimal
trīnī	trīn-	three each	nontrinitarian, trinal, trinary, trine, Trinidad, Trinitarian, trinity
tubus	tub-	tube	intubate, intubation, tubal, tubate, tube, tubicolous, tubicorn, tubiform, tubular, tubulate, tubule
†tubulus	tubul-	tube	intubate, intubation, tubal, tubate, tube, tubicolous, tubicorn, tubiform, tubular, tubulate, tubule
turba	turb-		disturb, disturbance, nonperturbative, perturb, perturbance, perturbation, perturbative, trouble, troublous, turbid, turbidity, turbinate, turbine, turbulence, turbulent
†turbula	turbul-		disturb, disturbance, nonperturbative, perturb, perturbance, perturbation, perturbative, trouble, troublous, turbid, turbidity, turbinate, turbine, turbulence, turbulent
tussis	tuss-	cough	pertussis, tussive
ūber	ūber-	udder	exuberance, exuberant, exuberate, uberous, uberty
ulcus	ulcer-	sore	nonulcerous, ulcer, ulcerate, ulceration, ulcerative, ulcerous
†ulcusculum	ulcuscul-	sore	nonulcerous, ulcer, ulcerate, ulceration, ulcerative, ulcerous
ulmus	ulm-	elm	Ulmaceae, ulmaceous, ulmic, Ulmus
ulter • ulterior • ultimus	ultr- • ulterior- • ultim-	– • farther • farmost, farthest	– • ulterior, ulteriority • penultimate, ultima, ultimate, ultimatum, ultimogeniture
umbra	umbr-	shade, shadow	adumbrate, adumbration, inumbrate, penumbra, umbrage, umbrageous, umbrella
†umbella	unbell-	shade, shadow	adumbrate, adumbration, inumbrate, penumbra, umbrage, umbrageous, umbrella
uncia	unci-	twelfth	inch, ounce, quincuncial, uncial
uncus	unc-	hook	unciform, Uncinaria, uncinate, Uncinia
unda	und-	wave	abound, abundance, abundant, inundate, redound, redundancy, redundant, superabound, superabundance, superabundant, surround, undulant, undulate, undulation, undulatory, undulose
undecim	undecim-	eleven	undecimarticulate
undeni	unden-	eleven each	undenary
unguis	ungu-	claw, hoof	ungual, unguiferous, unguiform, ungular, ungulate
†ungula	ungul-	claw, hoof	ungual, unguiferous, unguiform, ungular, ungulate
ūnus	ūn-	one	adunation, biunique, coadunate, coadunation, disunite, disunity, malunion, nonuniform, nonuniformity, nonunion, nonunique, nonunity, onion, reunification, reunion, reunite, triune, unanimity, unanimous, unary, unate, unicorn, unific, unification, uniform, uniformity, union, unique, unite, unity
†ūllus (Note: Contracted from ūnulus)	ūll-	one	adunation, biunique, coadunate, coadunation, disunite, disunity, malunion, nonuniform, nonuniformity, nonunion, nonunique, nonunity, onion, reunification, reunion, reunite, triune, unanimity, unanimous, unary, unate, unicorn, unific, unification, uniform, uniformity, union, unique, unite, unity
urbs	urb-	city	conurbation, interurban, suburb, suburban, urban, urbane
ursus	urs-	bear	ursine, Ursus
uterus	uter-	womb	extrauterine, transuterine, uterine, uterus
†uterculus	utercul-	womb	extrauterine, transuterine, uterine, uterus
ūva	uv-	grape	uvea, uveal, uvula, uvular
†ūvula	uvul-	grape	uvea, uveal, uvula, uvular
uxor	uxōr-	wife	uxorial, uxoricide, uxorilocal, uxorious
vacca	vacc-	cow	vaccary, vaccination, vaccine, vaquero
vacuus	vacu-	empty	avoid, avoidable, avoidance, devoid, evacuate, evacuee, vacant, vacate, vacation, vacuole, vacuous, vacuum, void, voidable, voidance
vadum	vad-	ford	vadose
vāgīna	vāgīn-	sheath	extravaginal, invaginate, invagination, transvaginal, vagina, vaginal, vanilla
vagus	vag-	wandering	astray, evagation, extravagance, extravagant, extravaganza, extravagate, stray, vagabond, vagary, vagile, vagrant, vague, vagus
valgus	valg-	bow-legged	valgus
valles vallis	val-	valley	valley, vale, valles, vallis
vallum	vall-	rampart	circumvallate, circumvallation, contravallation, interval, multivallate, vallar, vallate, vallation, vallum
valva	valv-		bivalve, valvate, valve
vanus	van-	empty, vain	evanesce, evanescence, evanescent, evanish, vaniloquence, vain, vanish, vanitas, vanity, vaunt
varius	vari-	varying	bivariate, contravariance, contravariant, countervair, covariance, covariant, covariate, covariation, intervarietal, invariable, invariance, invariant, miniver, multivariable, multivariate, subvariety, univariate, vair, vairy, variability, variable, variance, variant, variate, variation, variational, variegate, variegation, variegator, varietal, variety, variform, variola, variolation, variorum, various, vary
vās	vās-	vessel	extravasate, extravasation, extravascular, intravasate, intravasation, intravascular, vas, vasal, vascular, vasculature, vasculose, vasculum, vase, vasiform, vasoconstriction
†vāscellum	vāscell-	vessel	extravasate, extravasation, extravascular, intravasate, intravasation, intravascular, vas, vasal, vascular, vasculature, vasculose, vasculum, vase, vasiform, vasoconstriction
†vāsculum	vāscul-	vessel	extravasate, extravasation, extravascular, intravasate, intravasation, intravascular, vas, vasal, vascular, vasculature, vasculose, vasculum, vase, vasiform, vasoconstriction
vassus	vass-	servant	valet, varlet, vassal, vassalage
†vassallus	vassall-	servant	valet, varlet, vassal, vassalage
vastus	vast-	empty	devastate, devastation, vast, vastitude, vastity, wastage, waste
vellus	veller-	fleece	vellum, vellus
velox • velocior • velocissimus	veloc-	quick, swift	velocipede, velociraptor, velocity
vēlum	vēl-	sail, veil	reveal, revelation, revelator, revelatory, velamen, velar, velate, veliger, velum, vexil, vexillary, vexillatio, vexillum, voile
†vēxillum	vēxill-	flag	reveal, revelation, revelator, revelatory, velamen, velar, velate, veliger, velum, vexil, vexillary, vexillatio, vexillum, voile
vēna	vēn-	vein	devein, intravenous, vein, veinlet, venae cavae, venation, venational, venesection, venipuncture, venisection, venose, venosity, venous, venular, venule, venulose
†venula	venul-	vein	devein, intravenous, vein, veinlet, venae cavae, venation, venational, venesection, venipuncture, venisection, venose, venosity, venous, venular, venule, venulose
venēnum	venēn-		envenomation, venenation, venenose, venom, venomous
venter	ventr-	belly	eventration, interventricular, subventricular, supraventricular, ventral, ventricle, ventricular, ventriloquy
ventus	vent-	wind	ventage, ventail, ventilate, ventilation, ventilator, ventilatory, ventose, ventosity
†ventulus	ventul-	wind	ventage, ventail, ventilate, ventilation, ventilator, ventilatory, ventose, ventosity
venum	ven-		venal, venality, vend
venus	vener-	desire	venerable, venereal
vērātrum	vērātr-	hellebore	veratridine, veratrine, Veratrum
verbum	verb-	word	adverb, adverbial, proverb, proverbial, verbal, verbatim, verbiage, verbicide, verbid, verbose, verbosity
vermis	verm-	worm	vermeil, vermian, vermicelli, vermicide, vermicular, vermiculate, vermiculation, vermicule, vermiculite, vermiculose, vermiculture, vermiform, vermifuge, vermilion, vermin, verminate, vermination, verminous, vermiparous, vermivore, vermivorous
†vermiculus	vermicul-	worm	vermeil, vermian, vermicelli, vermicide, vermicular, vermiculate, vermiculation, vermicule, vermiculite, vermiculose, vermiculture, vermiform, vermifuge, vermilion, vermin, verminate, vermination, verminous, vermiparous, vermivore, vermivorous
vernus	vern-	spring	vernal
vērus	ver-	true	veracious, veracity, verify, verisimilitude, veritable, verity,
vespa	vesp-	wasp	vespacide
vesper	vesper-	evening	vespertine
vestigium	vestig-	trace, track	investigate, vestige, vestigial
vestis	vest-	clothing	circumvest, disinvest, disinvestment, divest, divestiture, divestment, invest, investiture, investment, reinvest, reinvestment, revest, revet, revetment, transvestite, travesty, vest, vestment, vesture
vetus	veter-	old	inveteracy, inveterate, inveteration, veteran, veterovata
via	vi-	way	bivial, bivious, bivium, convey, conveyance, convoy, deviance, deviant, deviate, deviation, devious, envoy, impervious, invoice, nontrivial, obviate, obviation, obvious, pervious, previous, quadrivial, quadrivium, semipervious, trivial, triviality, trivium, via, viaduct, vialis, viary, viatical, viaticum, viator, voyage, voyageur
viceni	vicen-, vigen-	twenty each	vicenarian, vicenary
vīcēsimus	vīcēsim-	twentieth	vicesimary, vicesimate, vicesimation, vigesimal
vicis	vic-	change	subvicar, vicar, vicarage, vicarial, vicariance, vicariant, vicariate, vicarious, viceroy, vicissitude, vicissitudinous, viscount, viscountess
vicus	vic-		vicinage, vicinal, vicine, vicinity
vīgēsimus	vīgēsim-	twentieth	septemvigesimal, vigesimal
vīgintī	vīgint-	twenty	vigintillion, vigintisexviri, vigintivirate, vigintiviri
vīlis • vilior • vilissimus	vīl-	cheap, vile	revile, revilement, vile, vilification, vilify, vilipend
vīlla	vīll-	country house	demivill, intervillage, supervillain, supervillainess, vill, villa, village, villain, villainess, villainous, villainy, villanelle, villatic, ville, villein, villeinage
†vīllula	vīllul-	country house	demivill, intervillage, supervillain, supervillainess, vill, villa, village, villain, villainess, villainous, villainy, villanelle, villatic, ville, villein, villeinage
villus	vill-	shaggy hair	intervillous, velour, velvet, villiform, villose, villosity, villous, villus
vindex	vindic-		avenge, revanche, revenge, vendetta, vengeance, vindicable, vindicate, vindication, vindicator, vindicatory, vindictive
vinum	vin-	wine	vignette, vine, viniculture, vinosity
vir	vir-	man (masculine)	quadrumvirate, triumvirate, virago, virile, virility, virtue
virga	virg-	rod, twig	virga, virgate, virgule
vīrus	viru-	poison	virulent, virus
viscus	viscer-	internal organ	eviscerate, visceral, viscus
vita	vit-	life	revitalize, viable, vital, vitality, vitamin
vitium	viti-		vice, vicious, vitiate
vitrum	vitr-	glass	vitreous, vitriol
viverra	viverr-	ferret	viverrid, viverrine
vola	vol-	palm	volar
vox	vōc-	voice	advocacy, advocate, advowson, avocate, avocation, avoke, avouch, avouchment, avow, avowal, avowance, avowant, avowry, convocation, convoke, devoice, disavouch, disavow, disavowal, disavowance, equivocal, equivocation, equivocator, invocation, irrevocable, nonvocal, prevocalic, provocation, revocable, revocation, revoice, revoke, sub voce, univocal, univocalic, univocity, vocable, vocabulary, vocal, vocalic, vocality, vocation, vocational, vocative, vociferant, vociferous, voice, voiceprint, vouch, voucher, vouchment, vouchsafe, vowel
†vōcula	vōcul-	voice	
vulgus	vulg-	crowd	divulge, vulgar, vulgarity, vulgate
vulnus	vulner-	wound	invulnerability, invulnerable, vulnerability, vulnerable, vulnerary, vulnerose
vulpēs	vulp-	fox	vulpecular, vulpicide, vulpine
†vulpēcula	vulpēcul-	fox	vulpecular, vulpicide, vulpine
vultur	vultur-	vulture	vulture, vulturine, vulturous
Citation form	Declining stem	Meaning	English derivatives

Key
†	Diminutive

== Prepositions and other words used to form compound words ==
Latin prepositions and other words
Word	Meaning	Prefixes	Ref.
ā, ab	away from	ab-, a-, abs-, as-	
ad	to, toward	ad-, a-, ac-, af-, ag-, al-, ap-, ar-, at-	
ambo	both	ambi-, am-, amb-	
ante	before	ante-, anti-	
bis	twice	bi-, bis-	
circum	around	circum-	
cis	this side of	cis-	
contrā	against, opposite to	contra-, contro-	
cum	together, with	con-, co-, col-, com-, cor-	
dē	down from	de-	
dexter	right, to the right hand	dextro-	
dis-, un-	apart	dis-, di-, dif-, dir-	
ex, ē	from, out of	ex-, e-, ef-	
extrā	outside	extra-, extro-	
in	in, into	in-, il-, im-, ir-	
īnfrā	below	infra-	
inter	among, between	inter-, intel-	
intrā	within	intra-, intro-	
iuxtā	beside	juxta-	
multus	much, many	multi-	
ne	no	ne-, neg-	
non-, un-	not	non-	
ob, obs	toward, against, in the way of, by reason of	ob-, o-, oc-, of-, og-, op-, os-	
paene	almost, nearly	pen-	
per	thorough, through	per-, pel-	
post	after, behind	post-	
prae	before	pre-	
praeter	by, past	preter-	
prō	for, forth, in front of	pro-, pol-, por-, prod-	
re-	again, back	re-, red-	
retro	backwards	retro-	
sē	apart, without	se-, sed-	
sinister	left, to the left hand	sinistr-	
sub	from below, under	sub-, su-, suc-, suf-, sug-, sum-, sup-, sur-, sus-	
subter	beneath	subter-	
super	above, over	super-	
suprā	above, more than	supra-	
trāns	across	trans-, tra-, tran-	
ultrā	beyond	ultra-	
ve-	out	ve-	

== See also ==
- Hybrid word
- Classical compound
- Latin
- Latin influence in English
- List of Byzantine Greek words of Latin origin
- List of Greek and Latin roots in English
- List of Latin phrases
- Latin mnemonics
- Latin school
- List of Latin abbreviations
- List of Latin and Greek words commonly used in systematic names
- List of Latinised names
- List of legal Latin terms
- Medical terminology
- Romanization (cultural)
- Toponymy
- Help:IPA/Latin
