= Eberhard of Béthune =

13th-century Flemish author

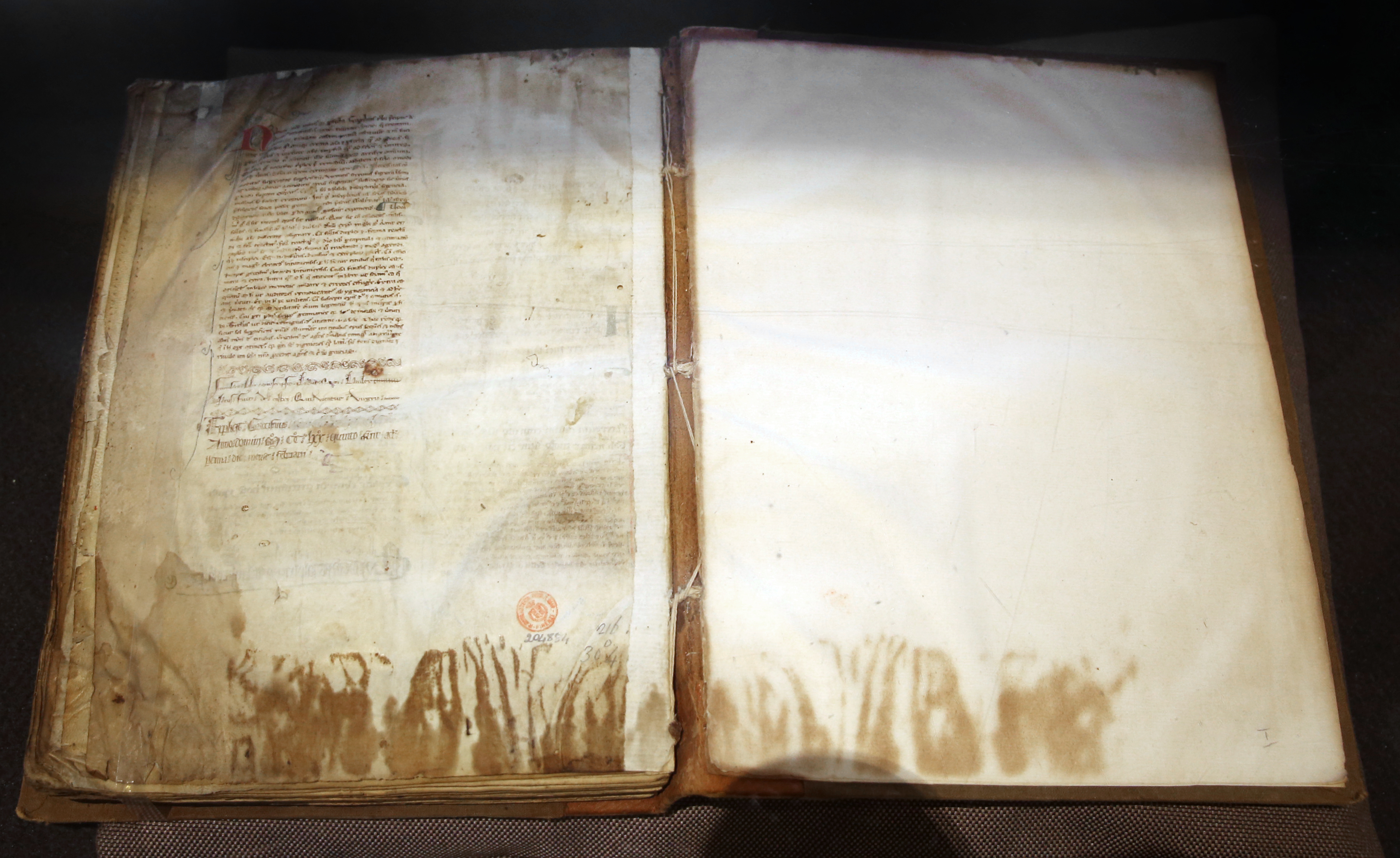
Graecismus by Eberhard of Béthune

Eberhard of Béthune (Note: Also known as Everard of Béthune, Évrard de Béthune, Éverard de Béthune, Ebrardus Bethuniensis or Bithuniensis, Eberhardus Bethuniensis, Eberard, Ebrard, Ebrad.) (died c. 1212) was a Flemish grammarian of the early thirteenth century, from Arras. He was the author of Graecismus, a popular Latin grammatical poem, dated to around 1212. The title derives from a short section on the Greek language.

Eberhard was also actively engaged in opposing the Waldensians and wrote a book entitled Liber Antihaeresis (c. 1210) against them. He is cited in Martyrs Mirror and Foxe's Book of Martyrs in relation to the etymology of the movement's name.

== Influence and manuscript tradition ==
Eberhard's Graecismus became an influential textbook in medieval Latin education, alongside the Doctrinale of Alexander of Villedieu. Both works were composed in verse to facilitate memorisation and were widely copied and studied in medieval schools. Unlike the Doctrinale, the Graecismus concentrated particularly on distinguishing words with similar forms or meanings, while also addressing grammatical figures and rhetorical devices.

The work circulated in numerous manuscript copies, often accompanied by explanatory glosses and commentaries. A late-thirteenth-century manuscript preserved in the British Library (Harley MS 2513) contains both marginal and interlinear commentary, illustrating how the text was studied and interpreted. The Graecismus continued to be copied and annotated during the later Middle Ages and was subsequently reproduced in printed editions.
