= Latin mnemonics =

Mnemonic device for teaching and remembering Latin grammar

A Latin mnemonic verse or mnemonic rhyme is a mnemonic device for teaching and remembering Latin grammar. Such mnemonics have been considered by teachers to be an effective technique for schoolchildren to learn the complex rules of Latin accidence and syntax. One of their earliest uses was in the Doctrinale by Alexander of Villedieu written in 1199 as an entire grammar of the language comprising 2,000 lines of doggerel verse. Various Latin mnemonic verses continued to be used in English schools until the 1950s and 1960s.

Authors who have borrowed Latin mnemonics from Latin textbooks for their own works include Thomas Middleton and Benjamin Britten. For example, in Britten's opera The Turn of the Screw, he used the words of a Latin mnemonic that he had found in a Latin grammar book belonging to Myfanwy Piper's aunt for Miles' "malo" song.

Jacques Brel wrote a song in 1962 about a Latin mnemonic verse. Some mnemonics have been recited to hymn tunes.

== History ==
Mnemonic rhymes have been considered by teachers to be an effective technique for schoolchildren to learn the complex rules of Latin accidence and syntax.

One of the earliest uses of mnemonic verse to teach Latin was the Doctrinale by Alexander of Villedieu, which was an entire grammar of the language comprising 2,000 lines of doggerel verse produced in 1199. It was used as a standard Latin grammar textbook across Europe for three centuries, and continued to be used in Italy and other places until relatively recently.^{[note 1]} Apart from Terentianus Maurus' De litteris syllabis et metris Horatii, discovered at Bobbio in 1493, all ancient grammatical texts prior to the Doctrinale had been prose works, with the only verse therein being citations from Roman poets; although some, such as those by Petrus Helias and Paolo da Camaldoli, contain mnemonic verses. Critics of Alexander at the time considered it to be "a monstrous idea to squeeze an entire grammar into verses".

The verse form of Doctrinale in fact arose by accident. Alexander had been employed by the bishop of Dol-de-Bretagne to teach Latin to his nephews, using the grammar of Priscian. He had noticed that the boys could not remember Priscian as prose, so he translated its rules into verse form. When Alexander was away one day, the bishop asked his nephews a grammar question, and was surprised when they answered in verse. The bishop persuaded Alexander to compile and to publish an entire book of such verses, which became the Doctrinale.

Many grammarians adopted Alexander's innovation soon afterwards, including John of Garland (incidentally Alexander's harshest critic) who wrote grammatical treatises in verse, Simon di Vercelli ("Maestro Sion") who wrote Novum Doctrinale somewhere between 1244 and 1268 (it only being transcribed by one of his pupils when he died in 1290), and Everard de Béthune who wrote Graecismus in 1212. From that point onwards, it was rare for a grammatical work to not at least contain the principal rules as mnemonic verses. Even the new humanistic grammars of the 15th century included mnemonic verses excerpted from Doctrinale or other versified grammars. This method of Latin grammar instruction was used by teachers well into the 20th century, it still being used in English schools in the 1950s and 1960s.

Thomas Sheridan wrote several mnemonic poems, with the intention of helping students to remember various parts of Latin grammar, prosody, and rhetoric, which were published as An Easy Introduction of Grammar in English for the Understanding of the Latin Tongue and A Method to Improve the Fancy. One of the shorter ones is "Of Knowing the Gender of Nouns by Termination":

All nouns in a make Feminine,
If you like "Musa" them decline,
Except they're from a Graecian line,
Or by their sense are Masculine.

== Examples and analysis ==
In his opera The Turn of the Screw, Benjamin Britten used the words of a Latin mnemonic that he had found in a Latin grammar book belonging to Myfanwy Piper's aunt for Miles' "malo" song:

Mālo: I would rather be
Mālo: In an apple tree
Mălo: Than a naughty boy
Mălo: In adversity

The rhyme explains the Latin near-homonym sentence "malo malo malo malo"^{[note 2]}, where each is a different meaning for one of the two words "mālo" and "mălo." One of its functions is to remind students that the ablative of comparison does not employ a preposition and that the preposition typically employed with the ablative of place where is sometimes omitted (typically in verse). Thus "in an apple tree" can be rendered "malo", instead of the more common "in malo".

Another author who borrowed from Latin grammar textbooks was Thomas Middleton. In his play A Mad World, My Masters the character Follywit addresses a treasure chest that he is about to rob:

Ha! Now, by my faith, a gentlewoman of very good parts: diamond, ruby, sapphire, ’onyx cum prole silexque‘. If I do not wonder how the quean 'scaped tempting, I'm an hermaphrodite!

The Latin phrase is a line taken from William Lily's Latin grammar Brevissima Institutio, from a mnemonic poem entitled "The Third Special Rule", the particular verse of which is entitled "Nouns of the doubtful Gender excepted":

Sunt dubii generis, cardo, margo, cinis, obex,
Forceps, pumex, imbrex, cortex, pulvis, adepsque:
Adde culex, natrix, et onyx cum prole, siléxque;
Quamvis hæc meliùs vult mascula dicier usus.

The literal meaning of the phrase is "onyx with its compounds, and silex". Its use by Middleton is in fact a pun. It has both a surface meaning on the precious metals in the treasure chest and a deeper meaning, given the "doubtful gender" title of the verse, on Follywit's own cross-dressing.

A Latin rhyme for remembering the list of Latin prepositions that take the ablative case is given by William Windham Bradley:

A, ab, absque, coram, de,
palam, clam, cum, ex, et e,
sine, tenus, pro, et prae;
His super, subter, addito,
et in, sub, si fit statio.

John Barrow Allen translated it into English as follows:

A (ab), absque, coram, de,
palam, clam, cum, ex, or e,
sine, tenus, pro, and prae.
And unto these, if rest at be intended,
Let in, sub, super, subter be appended.

Another version, taught in the 1950s, was :-

A (ab), absque, coram, de,
palam, clam, cum, ex, and e,
sine, tenus, pro, and prae.
Add super, subter, sub, and in,
When STATE not MOTION 'tis they mean.

A longer companion verse for the accusative case ended with the line

   When MOTION 'tis, not STATE they mean.

A condensed version is "SIDSPACE".

Such a mnemonic is a simple collection of words, and the musical rhythm acts as an aid to memory. Thomas Thornely asked "whose heart has not been stirred in early youth by the solemn chant" of this mnemonic, saying that "in this meaningless collocation of syllables we seem to hear the low rumbling of thunder of the Dies Irae and are naturally led to contrast it with the light tripping of the banded prepositions that favour the accusative". A similar example is the rosa mnemonic, used by French schoolchildren, which is simply the first declension:

rosa rosa rosam
rosae rosae rosa
rosae rosae rosas
rosarum rosis rosis

Jacques Brel's 1962 song about this calls it "le plus vieux tango du monde" (the world's oldest tango) which fair-haired youngsters "Ânonnent comme une ronde En apprenant leur latin" (drone like a round whilst learning their Latin).

Mnemonic rhymes have sometimes failed. Jean-Jacques Rousseau once complained of "those Ostrogothic verses that made me sick to my heart and could not get into my ear". Other children regarded the mnemonics more favourably, setting them to familiar tunes. Edward Hornby would recite the following, which he described as "little pearls of poetry", to the tune of the hymn "Love Divine, All Loves Excelling":

Third Nouns Masculine prefer
Endings o, or, os and er,
add to which the ending es,
if its Cases have increase.

Many neuters end in er,
siler, acer, verber, ver,
tuber, uber, and cadaver,
piper, iter, and papaver.

Third Nouns Feminine we class
ending is, x, aus, and as,
s to consonant appended,
es in flexion unextended.

== Footnotes ==
- Note 1: There were 46 editions printed in Italy alone before 1500. Its use died out in German schools around 1520, but the last Italian edition was published in 1588.
- Note 2: A longer sentence is "malo malo malo malo malo malo malo, quam dente vento occurrere". This uses additional meanings for "malo" and translates to "I would rather meet with a bad apple, with a bad tooth, than a bad mast with a bad wind.".
