= Rotowaro Carbonisation Plant =

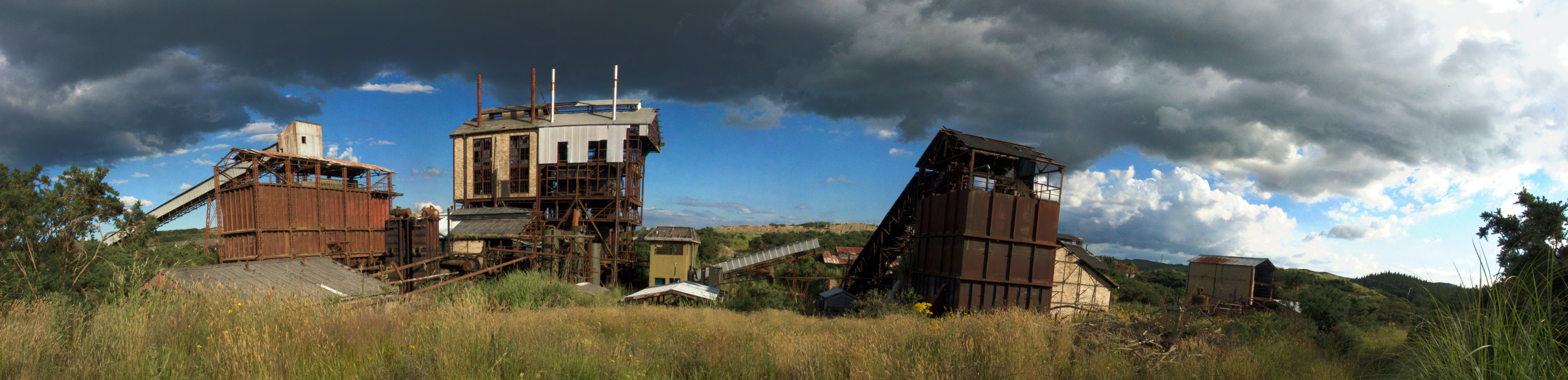
- The Rotowaro Carbonisation Plant.
- Interactive map of the Rotowaro Carbonisation Plant area

General information
- Type: Coal processing plant
- Location: South of Rotowaro Road, 8 km south-west of Huntly
- Coordinates: 37°36′6″S 175°4′24″E
- Construction started: 1930
- Completed: 1931

Heritage New Zealand – Category 1
- Designated: 22 August 1991
- Reference no.: 7013

The Rotowaro Carbonisation Plant, also known as the Waikato Carbonisation Plant, was a coal processing plant in the Rotowaro/Huntly area, New Zealand. It was also the first plant to use the Lurgi process in the Southern Hemisphere.

== History ==
The first of its kind in the Southern Hemisphere, the plant was constructed in the late 1930s to convert otherwise unusable low-quality coal from the nearby Rotowaro Coal Mines into carbon briquettes, which were then used for domestic heating. The coal was carbonised using the Lurgi process, the result being coke and charcoal, with tar and creosote as by-products. The tar was used with the char to create the briquettes. Waste from the plant was discharged directly into the nearby Awaroa stream, which caused heavy pollution of the waterway. Following complaints about the pollution, Waikato Carbonisation Limited trialed a waste incineration programme, but the output of the plant exceeded the capacity of the burners. The excess was pumped into waste pools up until the plant's closure in 1985, when major fire caused a retort to explode.

Various ownership changes lead to the complete abandonment of the plant. The plant currently sits on land administered by the Public Trust.

Due to the historic nature of the site, the plant is classed as a Category I Historic Place by the Historic Places Trust.

== Pollution and cleanup ==
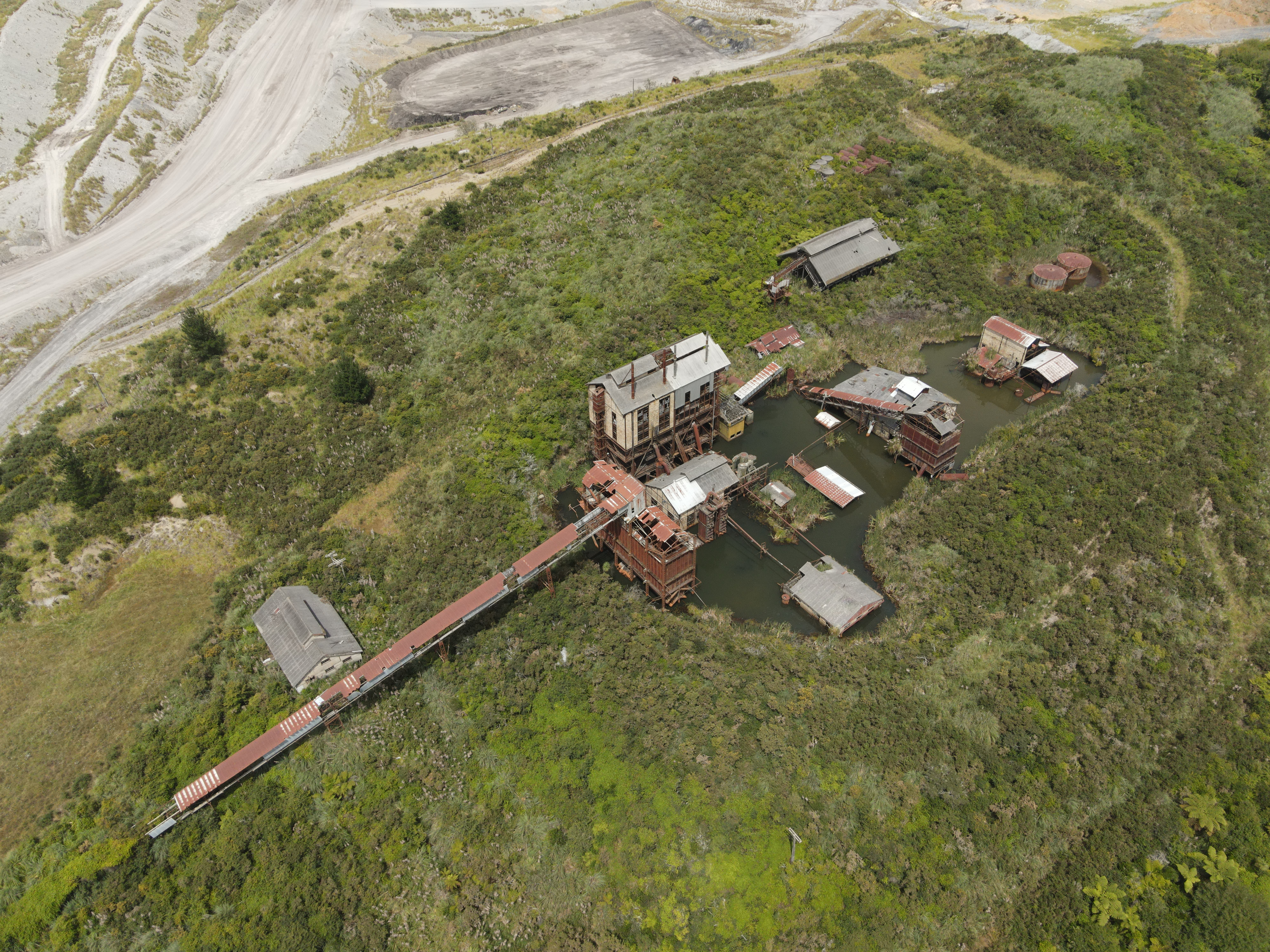
The former plant in 2024

After the plant's closure, the plant was owned jointly by the Ministry of Energy and New Zealand Steel. Following the private sale of NZ Steel, the land on which the plant was located passed onto the local regional administration. An environmental evaluation of the site in the 1990s showed that the degree of contamination was at a hazardous level. As a result, Environment Waikato completed a cleanup of the site, and removed all chemicals that posed a risk to human health or to the environment.
