= Culm bomb =

Compressed block of culm used for fuelling a fire

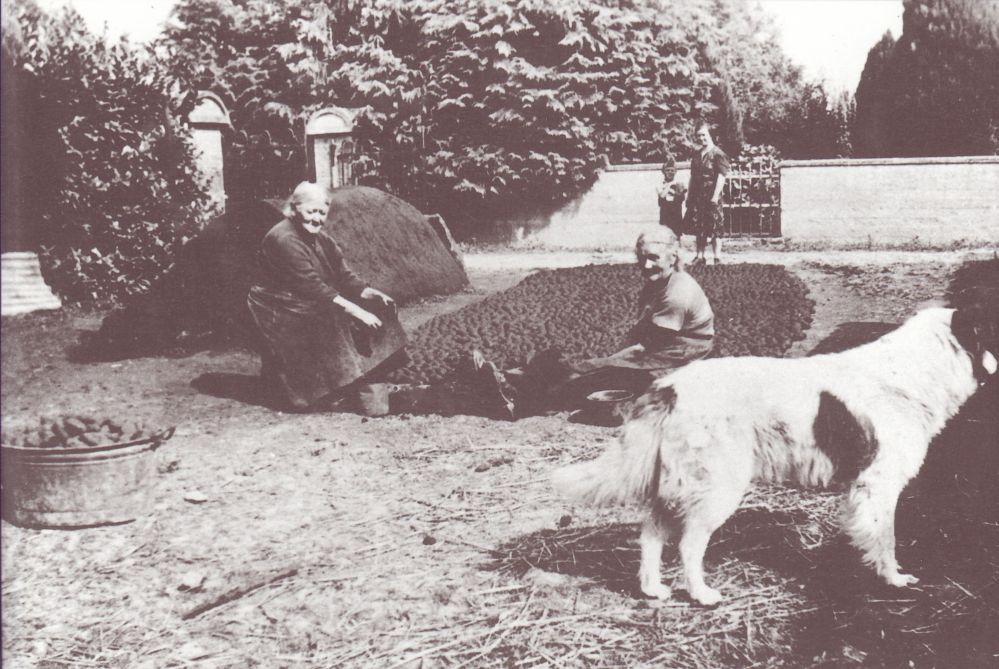
Women making culm bombs in Ireland in the early 20th century

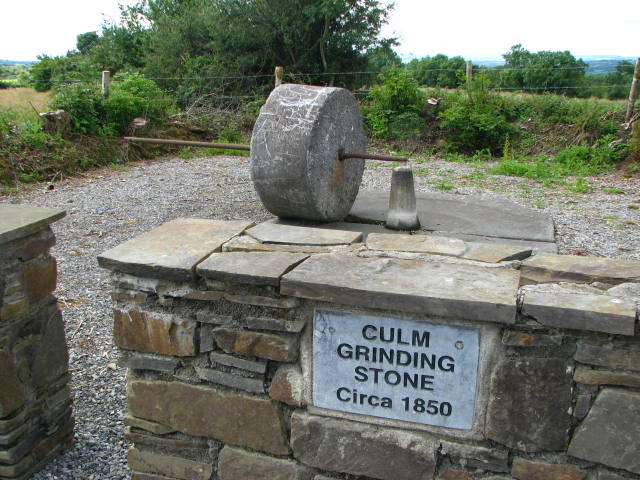
A horse-powered culm crusher near Castlecomer in County Kilkenny

A culm bomb or culm ball is a compressed ball of culm (anthracite), mixed with yellow clay as a binding agent, historically used as a solid fuel. Associated primarily with Ireland, culm bombs were historically used in industry (for example in blacksmith's forges and grain drying) as well as for domestic use. They were most commonly used in coal mining areas, including Castlecomer, County Kilkenny and Ballingarry, County Tipperary.

In domestic use, culm bombs were often handmade by those who used them as coal finings could be bought (or found) more cheaply than buying coal. The yellow clay used to bind the culm could be dug up in a field, being common to the areas in which culm bombs were made.

When large quantities of bombs were being made, the process was somewhat mechanised by using a culm-crusher drawn by a horse. Otherwise, for smaller batches used by a single family, the process was entirely manual, with a person wearing a strong pair of boots trampling the culm and clay mixture. This process, known as "dancing the culm", required a person to tread the culm and clay together until it was ready to be made into balls or "bombs".

When the culm was sufficiently prepared, it was hand-formed into "bombs" or "bumbs". These were about the size of a hand grenade (hence the term bomb), and left out to dry in the sun. While the process of preparing the mixture was typically undertaken by men, the making of the balls was traditionally completed by women or children. During the 1920s and 1930s, a mechanical device known as a "culm shooter" was used to reduce the mechanical labour required to make culm balls. Once made, culm bombs were typically stacked on a fire started with kindling in much the same way a coal fire is sustained.

The use of culm bombs lasted well into the middle of 20th-century Ireland, by which time Ireland's coal seams were becoming depleted and affordable alternatives for heating and cooking had improved (including mass-produced peat briquettes for ranges, with oil, electricity and natural gas used for hot water boilers).

== See also ==
- Briquette
- Coal refuse
- East Asian coal briquettes
