= Briquette =

Compressed block of biomass used for fueling a fire

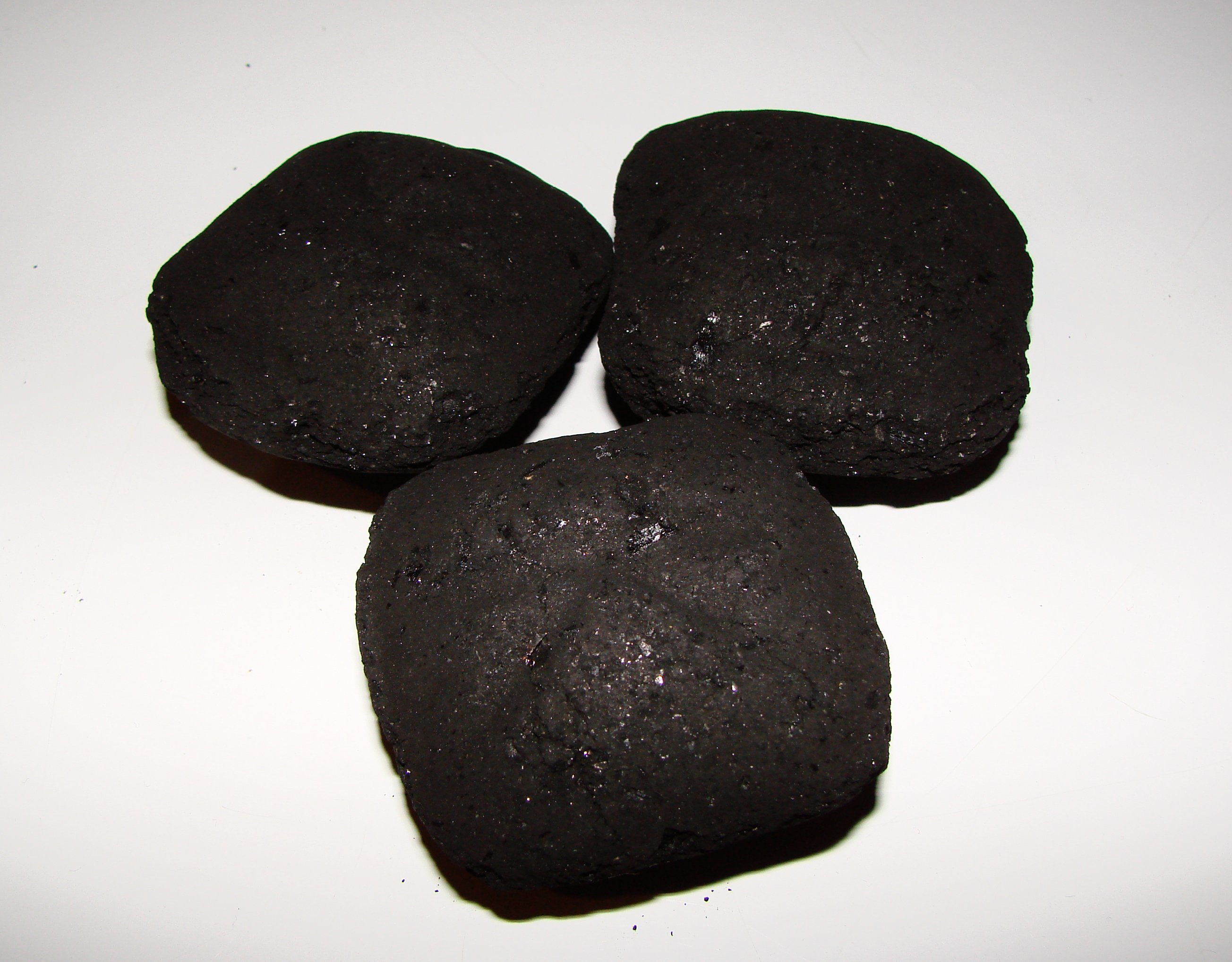
Kingsford charcoal briquettes

A briquette (French: [bʁikɛt]; in English also spelled briquet or brickette) is a compressed block of coal dust or other combustible biomass material (e.g. charcoal, sawdust, wood chips, peat, or paper) used for fuel and kindling to start a fire. The term is a French word meaning "small brick".

== Coal briquettes ==
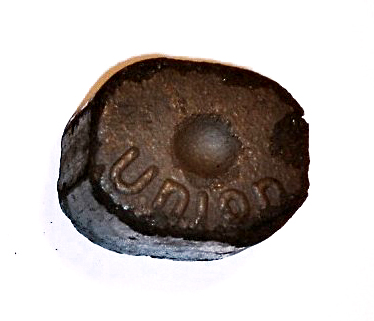
Lignite briquette

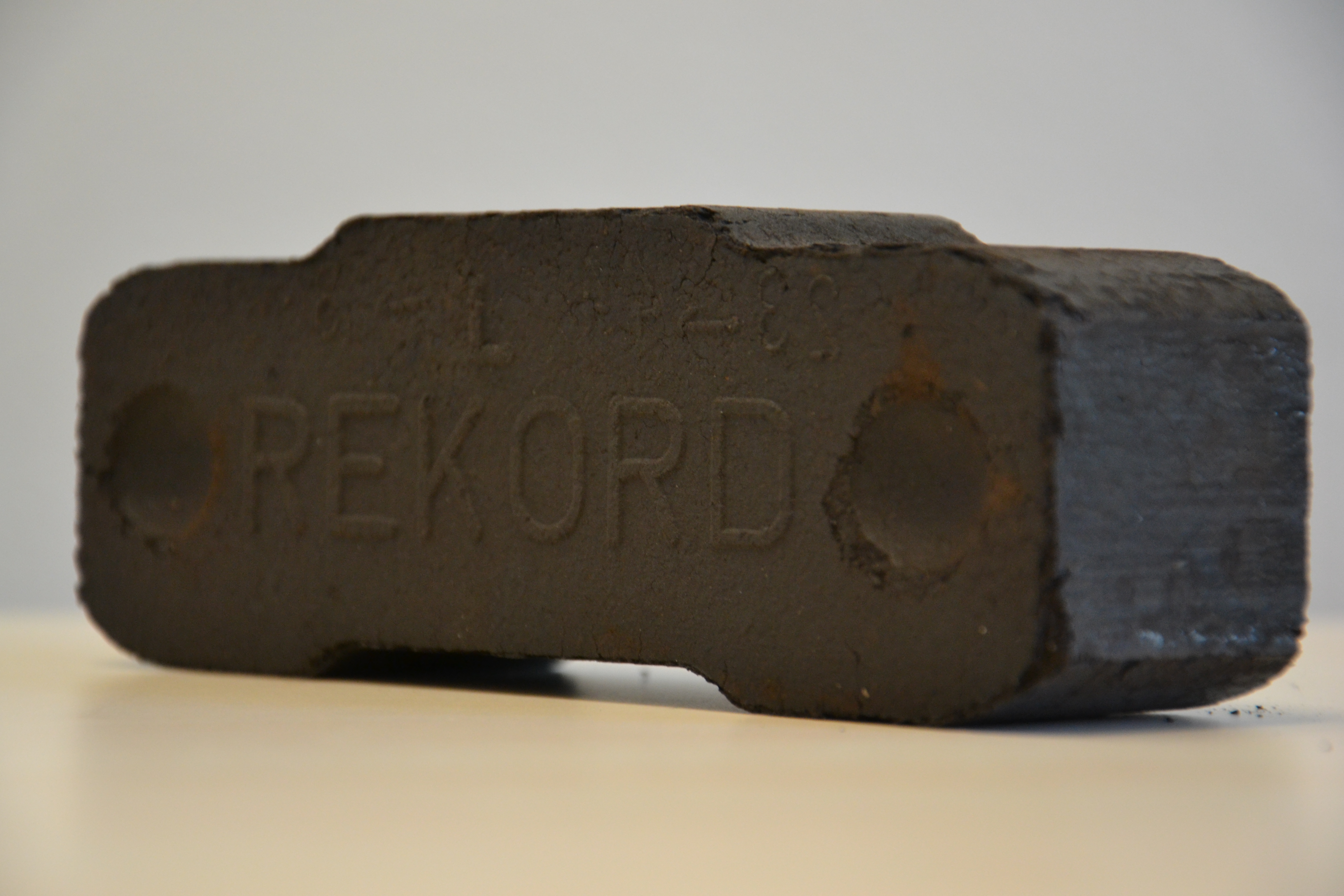
Coal briquette

Coal briquettes have long been produced as a means of using up 'small coal', the finely broken coal inevitably produced during the mining process. Otherwise this is difficult to burn as it is hard to arrange adequate airflow through a fire of these small pieces; also such fuel tends to be drawn up and out of the chimney by the draught, giving visible black smoke.

The first briquettes were known as culm bombs and were hand-moulded with a little wet clay as a binder. These could be difficult to burn efficiently, as the unburned clay produced a large ash content, blocking airflow through a grate.

With Victorian developments in engineering, particularly the hydraulic press, it became possible to produce machine-made briquettes with minimal binder content. A tar or pitch binder was used, obtained first from gas making and later from petrochemical sources. These binders burned away completely, making it a low-ash fuel. A proprietary brand of briquettes from the South Wales coalfield was Phurnacite, developed by Idris Jones for Powell Duffryn. These were intended to emulate a high-quality anthracite coal, such as that from the Cynheidre measures. This involved blending a mixture of coals from different grades and colliery sources. Phurnacite used the following mix:

- Bituminous coal, 25%
- Steam coal, 45%
- Dry steam coal, 22%
- Pitch, 8%

Early briquettes were large and brick-shaped. Phurnacite briquettes later adopted a squared oval shape. This regular shape packed well as a good firebed, with plentiful airflow. They are also easy to mechanically feed, allowing the development of automatically controlled heating boilers that could run for days without human intervention.

== Charcoal briquettes ==
Burning Ogatan

Charcoal briquettes sold for cooking food can include:

- Wood charcoal (fuel)
- Lignite coal (fuel)
- Anthracite coal (fuel)
- Limestone (ash colourant)
- Starch (binder)
- Borax (release agent)
- Sodium nitrate (accelerant)
- Sawdust
- Wax (some brands: binder, accelerant, ignition facilitator).
- Chaff (rice chaff and peanut chaff)

As a rule of thumb, a charcoal briquette will heat a camping Dutch oven by approximately 25 °F (14 °C), so 20 charcoal briquettes will heat it by 500 °F (280 °C).

== East-Asian briquettes ==
Home made charcoal briquettes (called tadon) were found after charcoal production in Japanese history. In the Edo period, polysaccharide extracted from red algae was widely used as a binder. After the imports of steam engines in the Meiji period, coal and clay became major ingredients of Japanese briquettes. These briquettes, rentan and mametan, were exported to China and Korea. Today, coal briquettes are avoided for their sulfur oxide emission. Charcoal briquettes are still used for traditional or outdoor cooking. Woody flakes such as sawdust or coffee dust are major ingredients of modern mass-consumed briquettes (e.g., Ogatan).

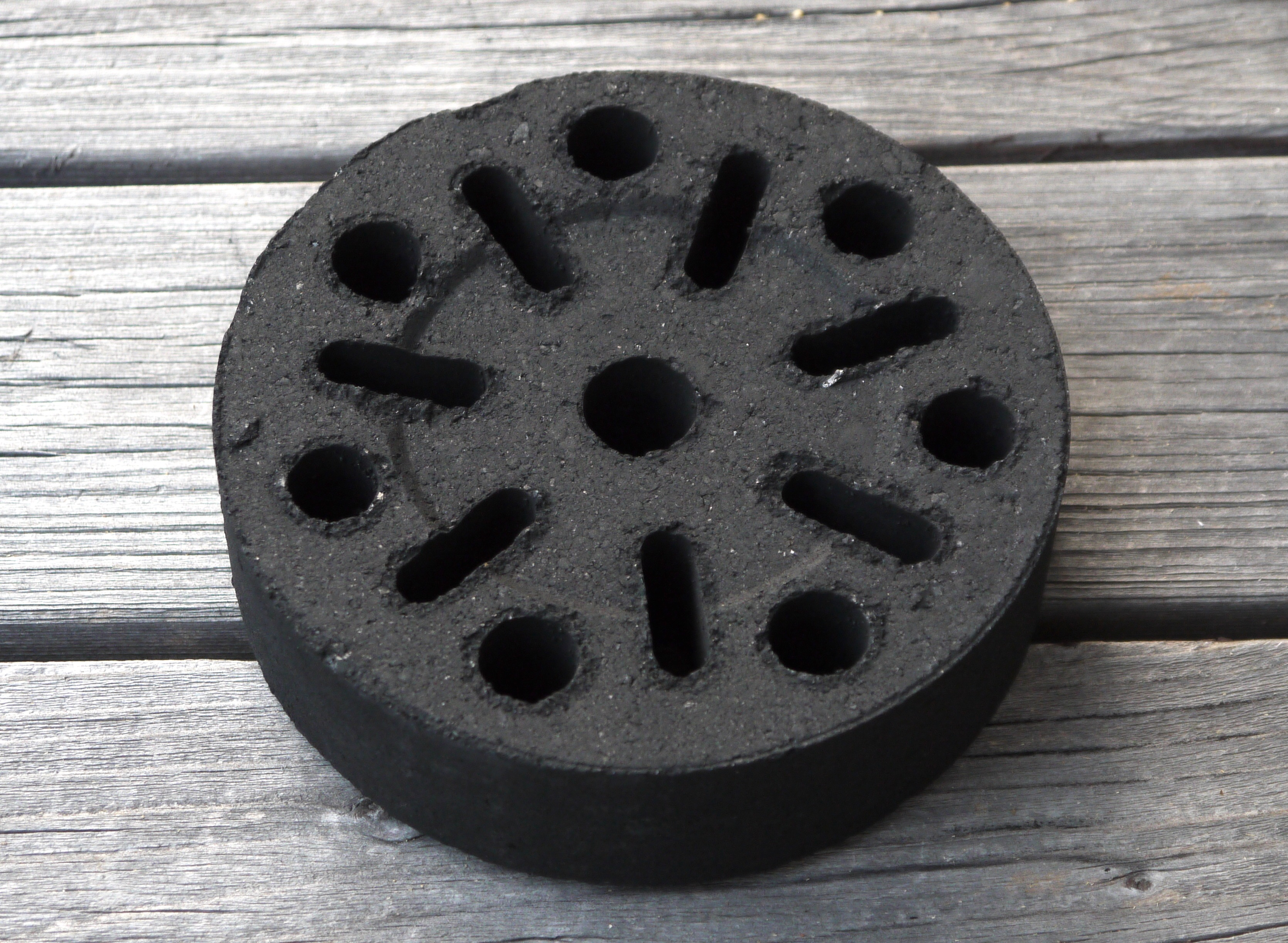
Quick grill briquette

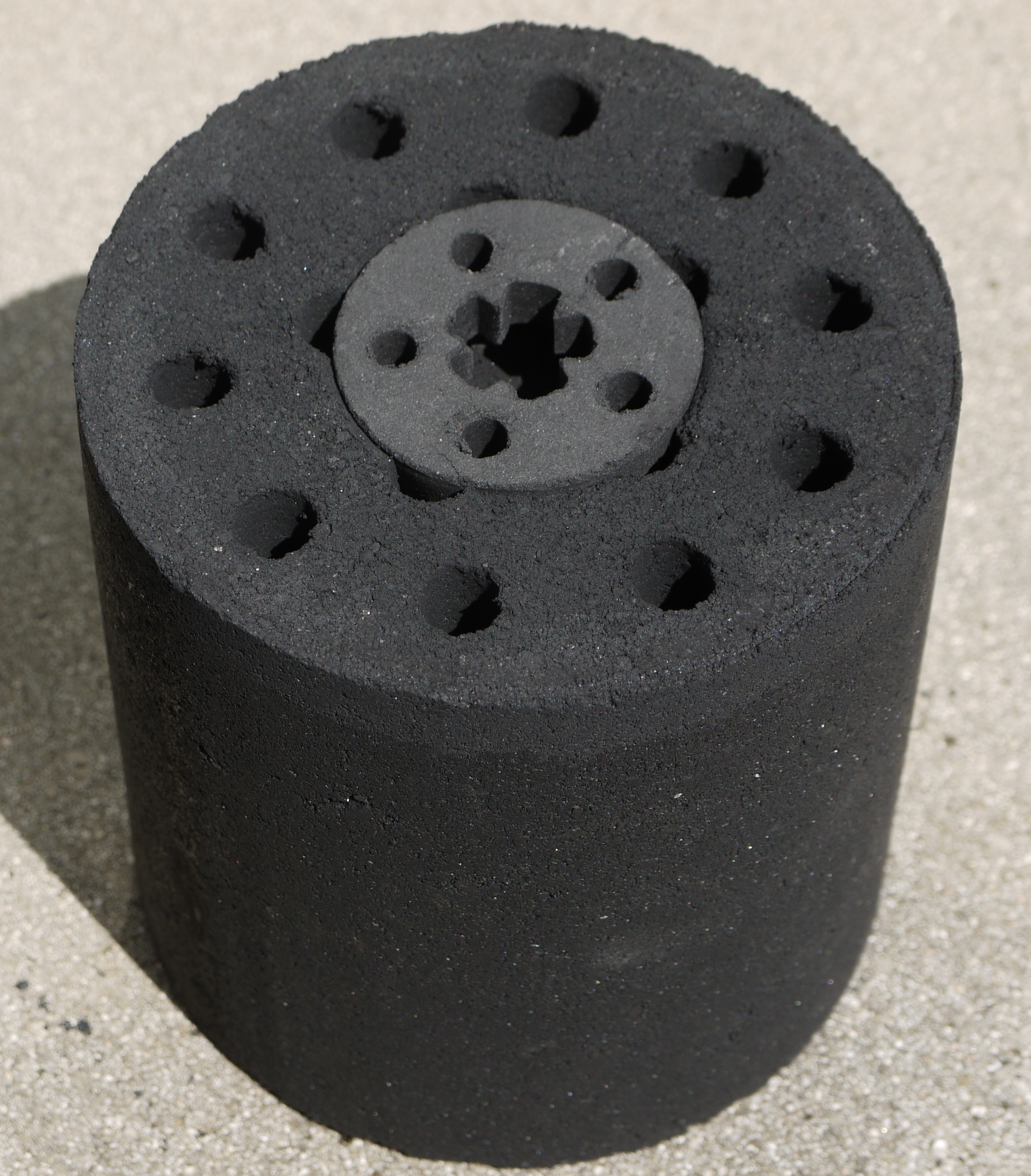
Rentan, Japanese coal briquette

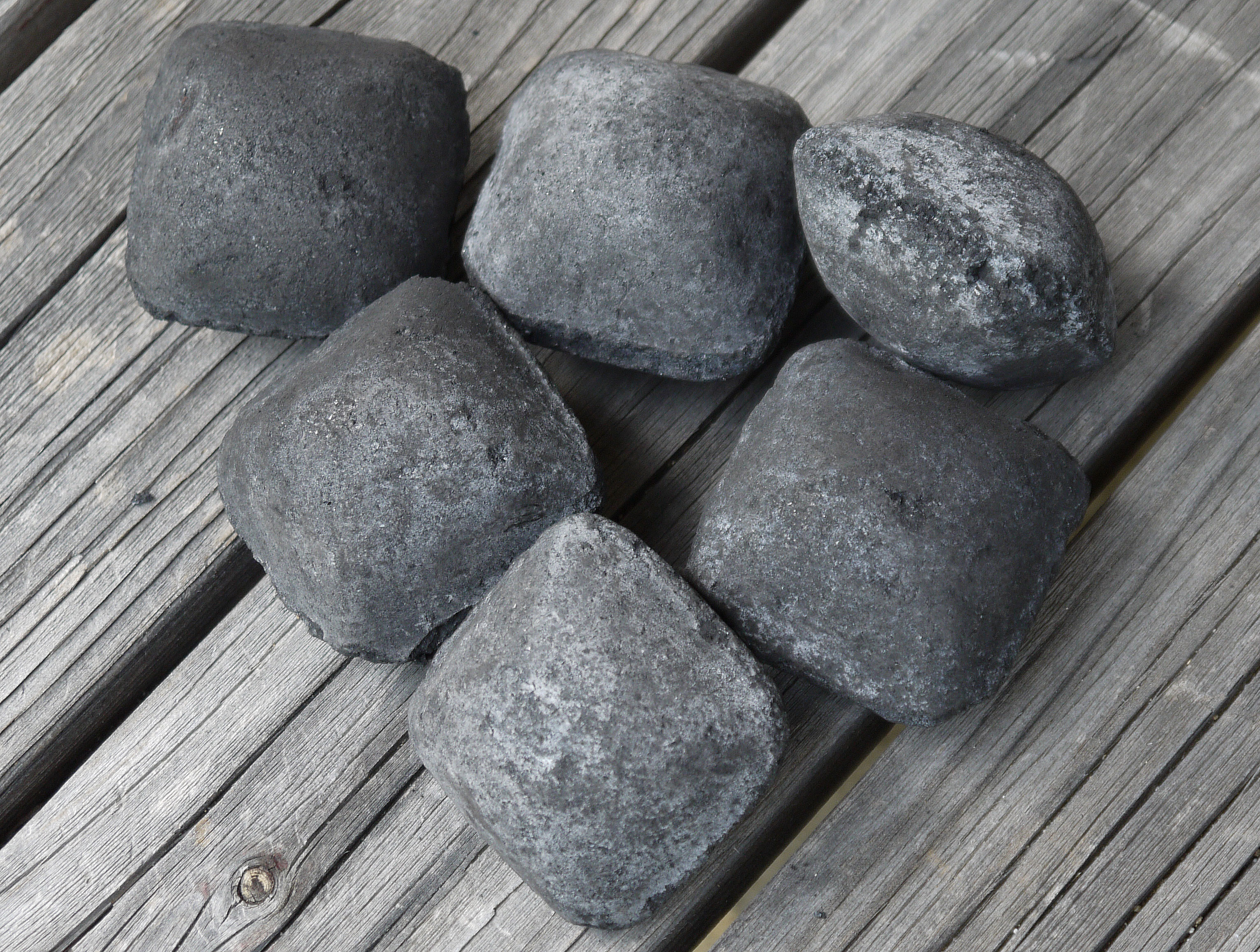
Mametan, Japanese coal briquettes

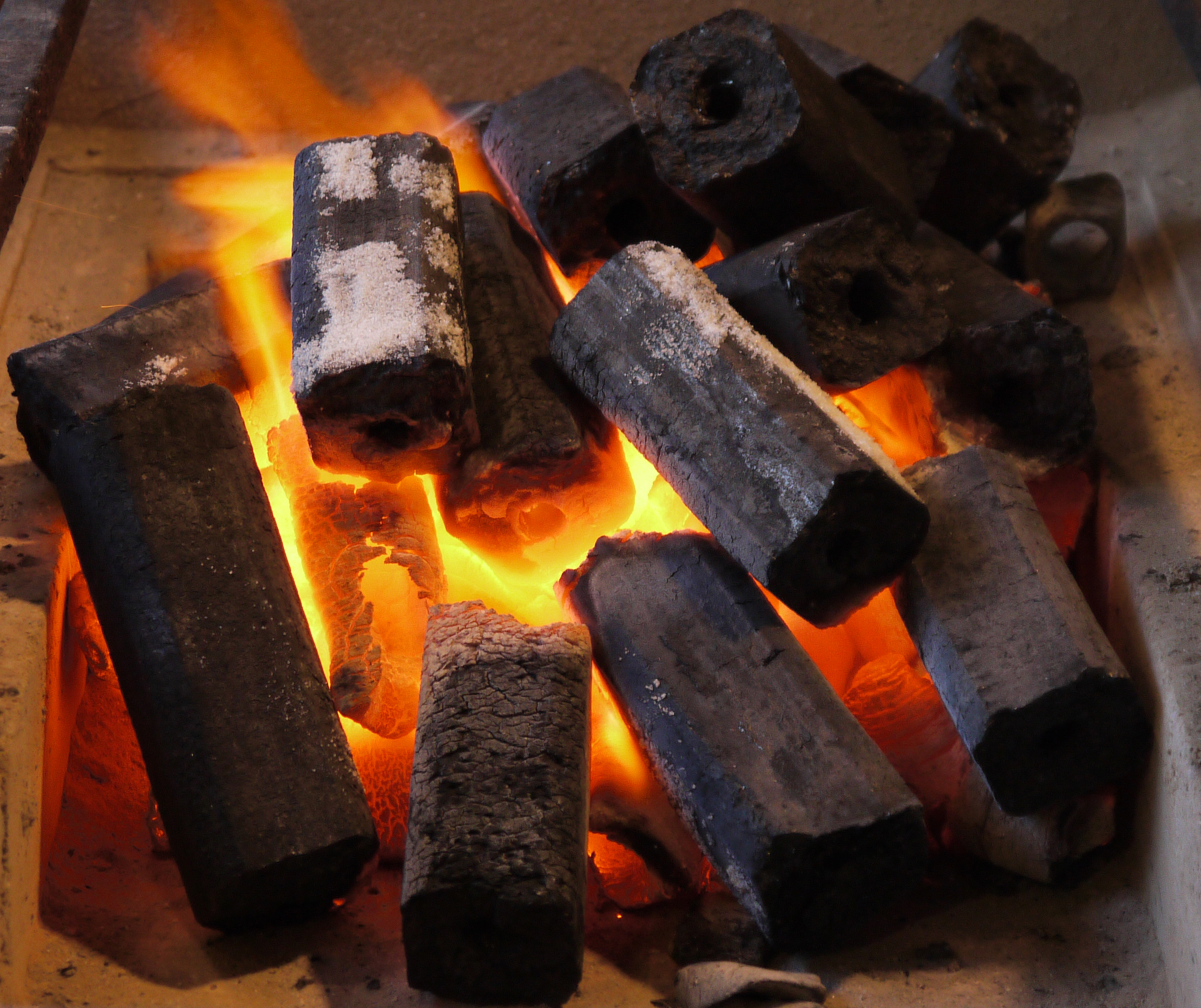
Ogatan, Japanese charcoal briquettes made from sawdust

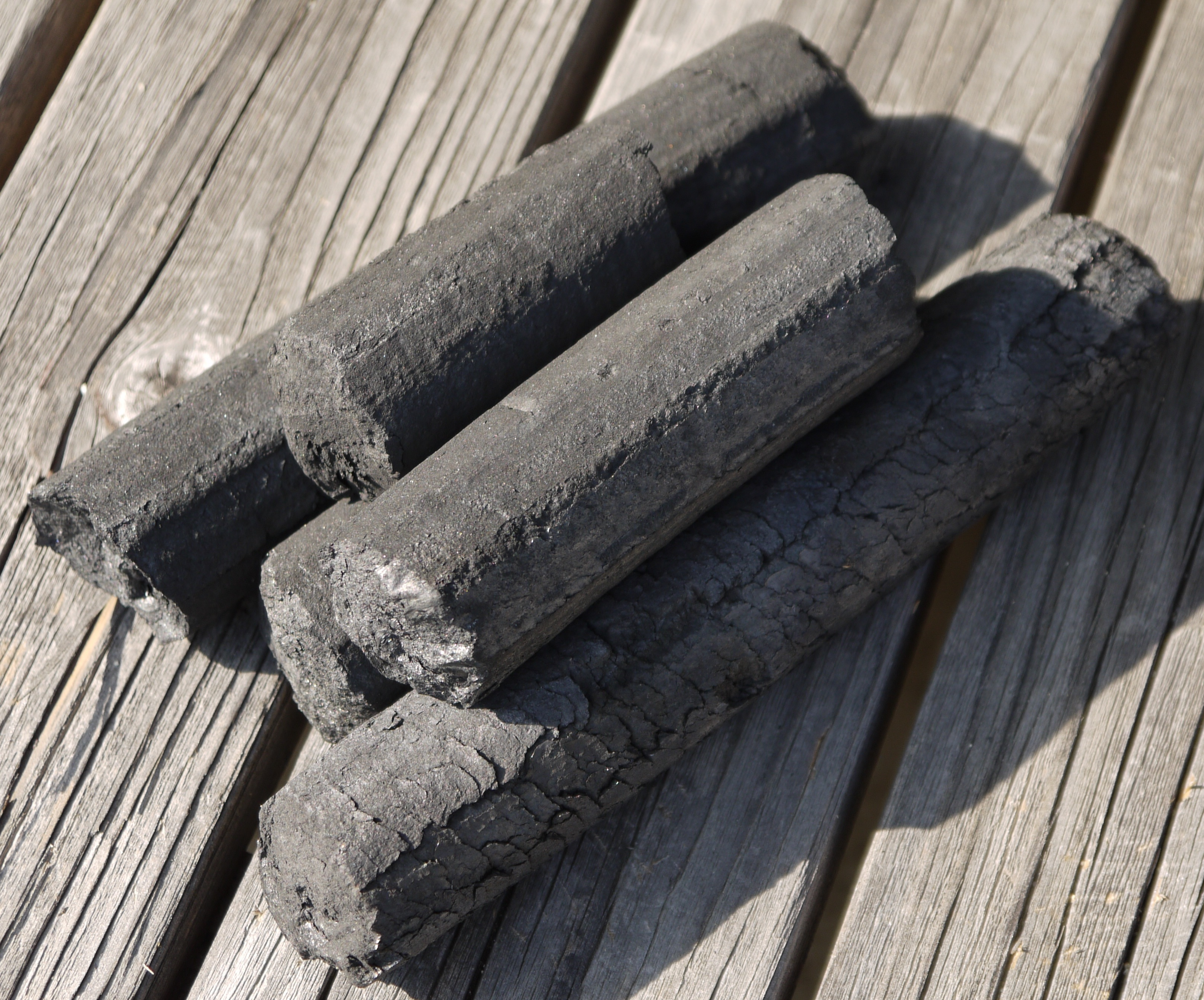
Solid type Ogatan

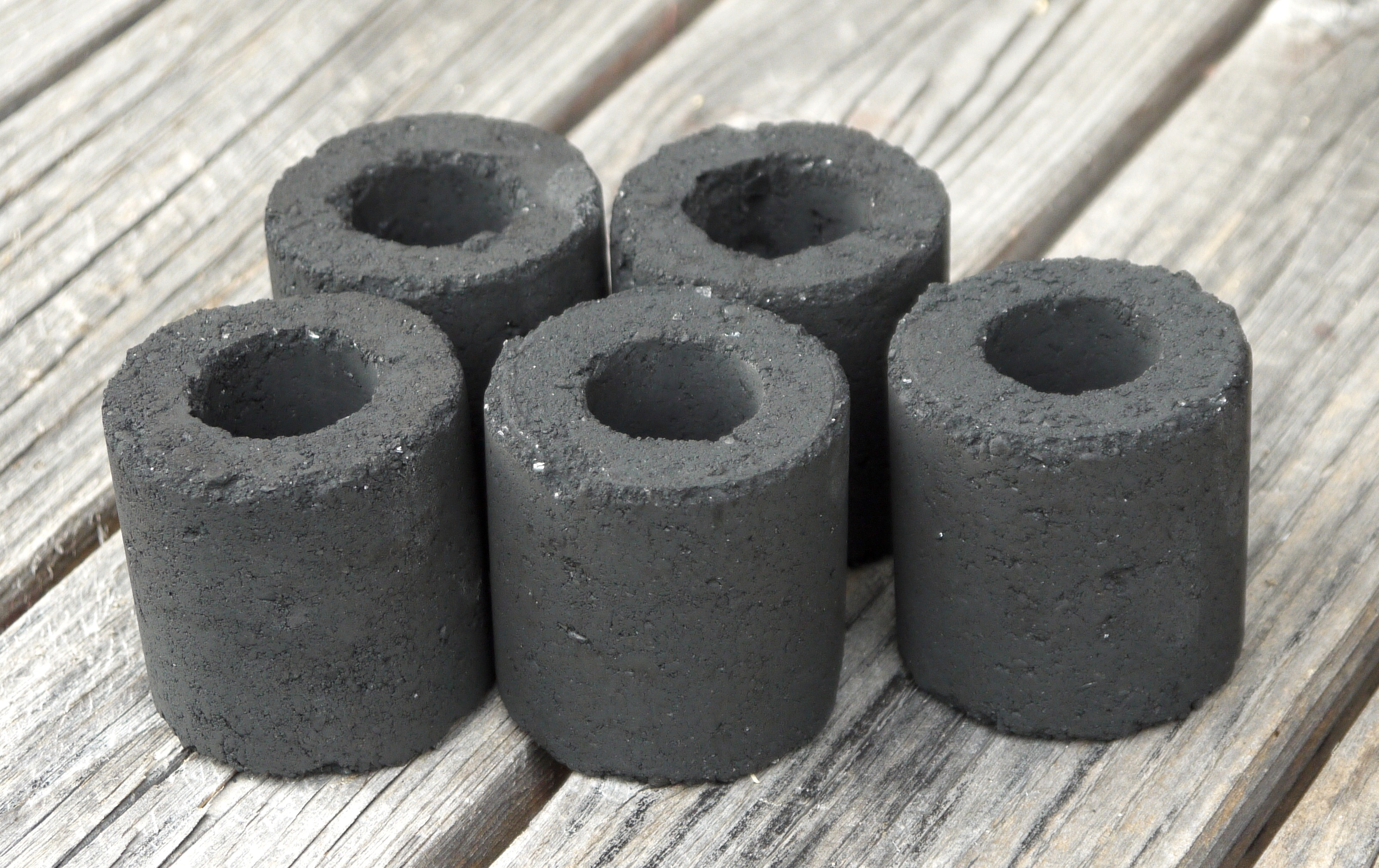
High calo tan, made from coffee dust

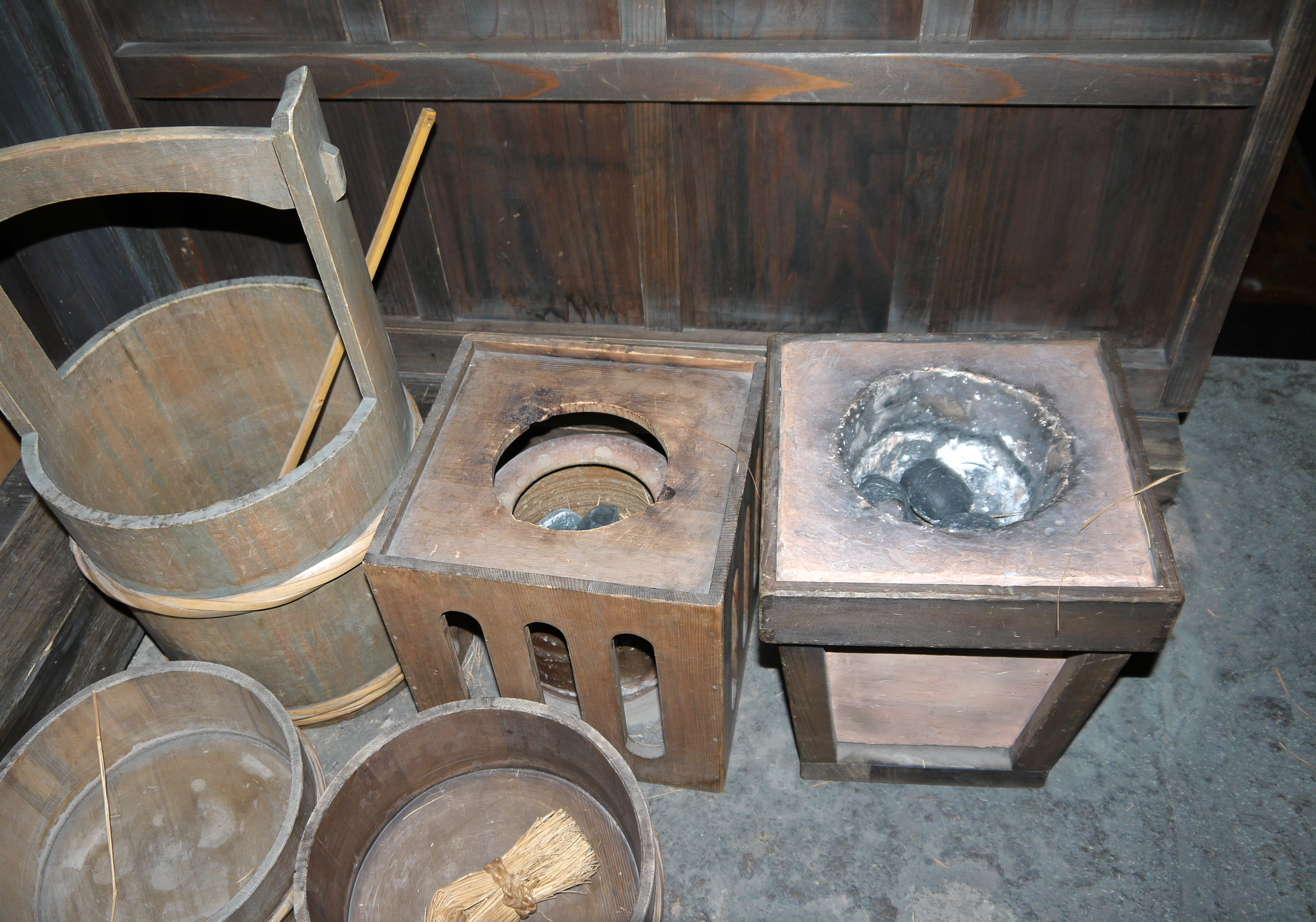
Tadon and shichirin

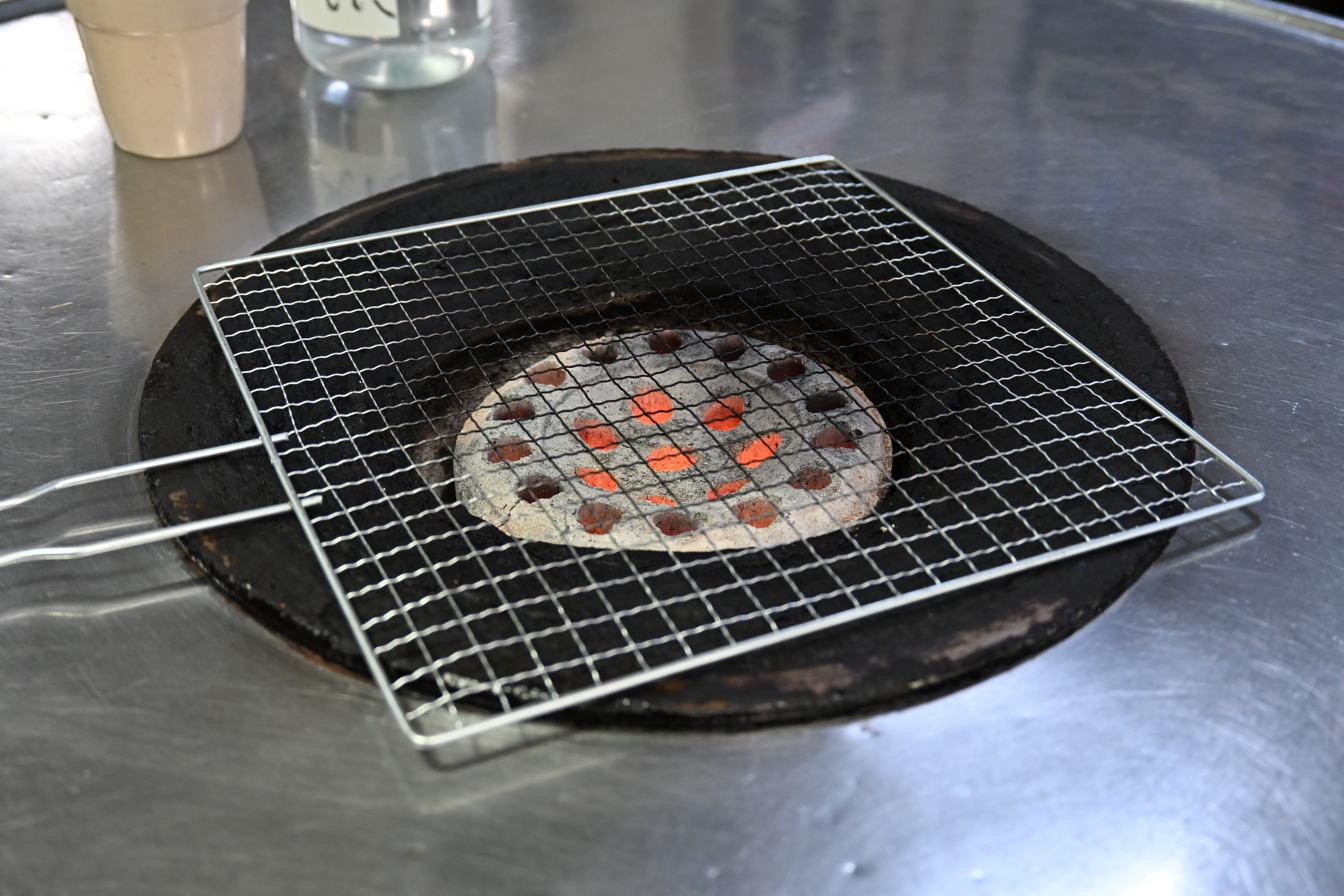
22-hole Yeontan, Korean coal briquette

=== Use in China ===
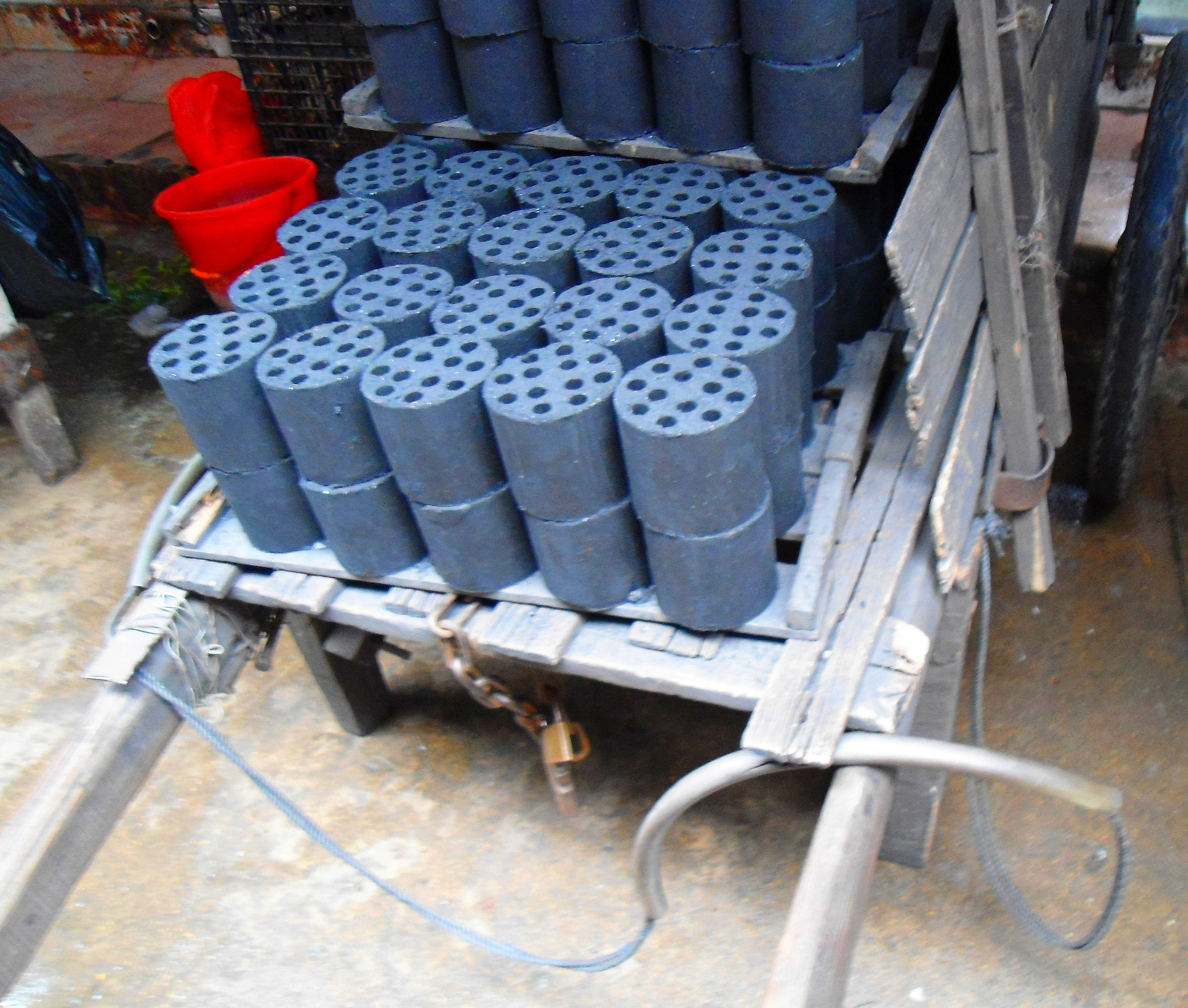
Fuel briquettes, called mei (coal 煤), sold throughout China

Throughout China, cylindrical briquettes, called "fēng wō méi" (beehive coal 蜂窩煤 / 蜂窝煤) or "Mei" (coal 煤) or "liàn tàn" (kneaded coal 練炭 / 练炭), are used in purpose-built cookers.

The origin of "Mei" is "Rentan" (kneaded coal 練炭) of Japan. Rentan was invented in Japan in the 19th century, and spread to Manchukuo, Korea and China in the first half of the 20th century. There were many Rentan factories in Manchukuo and Pyongyang. Although Rentan went out of use in Japan after the 1970s, it is still popular in China and Vietnam ("than tổ ong" coal).

The cookers are simple, ceramic vessels with metal exteriors. Two types are made: the single, or triple briquette type, the latter holding the briquettes together side by side. These cookers can accommodate a double stack of cylinders. A small fire of tinder is started, upon which the cylinder(s) is placed. When a cylinder is spent, another cylinder is placed on top using special tongs, with the one below igniting it. The fire can be maintained by swapping spent cylinders for fresh ones, and retaining a still-glowing spent cylinder.

Each cylinder lasts for over an hour. These cookers are used to cook, or simmer, pots of tea, eggs, soups, stews, etc. The cylinders are delivered, usually by cart, to businesses, and are very inexpensive.

== Peat briquettes ==
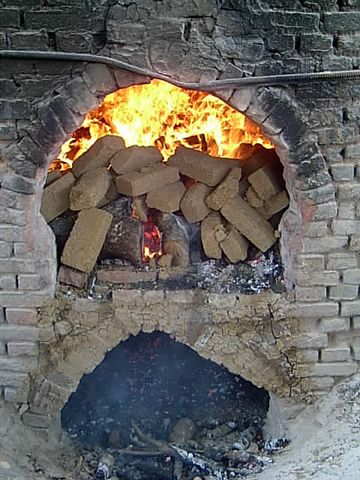
Peat block

In Ireland, briquettes made from peat, the product of the decomposition of marsh plants in a low-oxygen environment, are a common type of solid fuel, largely replacing sods of raw peat as a domestic fuel. These briquettes consist of shredded peat, compressed to form a virtually smokeless, slow-burning, easily stored and transported fuel. Although often used as the sole fuel for a fire, they are also used to light a coal fire quickly and easily. Peat briquettes are also sometimes used for grilling meats and vegetables as they bring a unique aroma to the food. Bord na Móna is the Irish state owned company in charge of peat, which also handles production of peat briquettes.

== Biomass briquettes ==
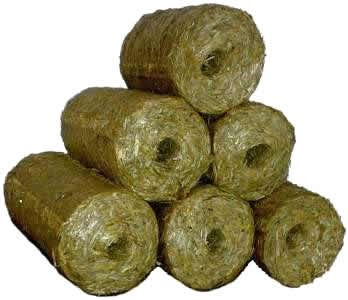
Straw or hay briquettes

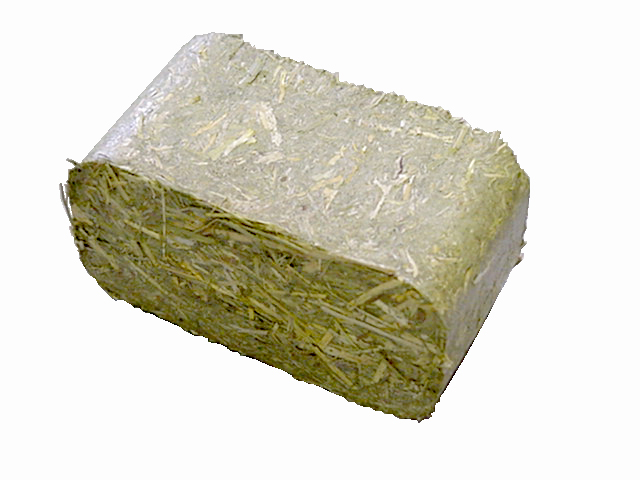
Biomass briquette

Biomass briquettes are made from agricultural waste and are a replacement for fossil fuels such as oil or coal, and can be used to heat boilers in manufacturing plants, and also have applications in developing countries. Biomass briquettes are a technically renewable source of energy and their emissions do not constitute an anthropogenic greenhouse gas, unlike emissions from traditional coal briquettes, as any carbon released was taken directly from the atmosphere in recent history, not sequestered deep in the earth during the carboniferous period as with coal.

Although briquetting is an appropriate technology for the production of renewable energy, its widespreadness is limited. Especially due to the high initial investments and energy consumption of a high-pressure briquetting press. However, manual low-pressure briquetting presses (operating pressure <5 MPa) can represent a relevant alternative, regarding to their ease of use and modest energy consumption for the developing countries.

A number of companies in India have switched from furnace oil to biomass briquettes to save costs on boiler fuels. The use of biomass briquettes is predominant in the southern parts of India, where coal and furnace oil are being replaced by biomass briquettes. A number of units in Maharashtra (India) are also using biomass briquettes as boiler fuel. Use of biomass briquettes can earn Carbon Credits for reducing emissions in the atmosphere. Lanxess India and a few other large companies are supposedly using biomass briquettes for earning Carbon Credits by switching their boiler fuel. Biomass briquettes also provide more calorific value/kg and save around 30–40 percent of boiler fuel costs.

A popular biomass briquette emerging in developed countries takes a waste produce such as sawdust, compresses it and then extrudes it to make a reconstituted log that can replace firewood. It is a similar process to forming a wood pellet but on a larger scale. There are no binders involved in this process. The natural lignin in the wood binds the particles of wood together to form a solid. Burning a wood briquette is far more efficient than burning firewood. Moisture content of a briquette can be as low as 4%, whereas green firewood may be as high as 65%.

For example, parameters of fuel briquettes made by extrusion from sawdust in Ukraine:

| Parameter | Value |
|---|---|
| Briquette density, t/m^{3} | 1.0–1.2 |
| Heat content, MJ/kg | 19.3–20.5 |
| Ash content, % | 0.5–1.5 |

(MJ = Megajoules. 3.6 MJ equals 1 kWh.)

The extrusion production technology of briquettes is the process of extrusion screw wastes (straw, sunflower husks, buckwheat, etc.) or finely shredded wood waste (sawdust) under high pressure when heated from 160 to 350 °C (320 to 662 °F). As shown in the table above the quality of such briquets, especially heat content, is much higher comparing with other methods like using piston presses.

Sawdust briquettes have developed over time with two distinct types: those with holes through the centre, and those that are solid. Both types are classified as briquettes but are formed using different techniques. A solid briquette is manufactured using a piston press that compresses sandwiched layers of sawdust together. Briquettes with a hole are produced with a screw press. The hole is from the screw thread passing through the centre, but it also increases the surface area of the log and aids efficient combustion.

== Paper briquettes ==
Paper briquettes are the byproduct of a briquettor, which compresses shredded paper material into a small cylindrical form. Briquettors are often sold as add-on systems to existing disintegrator or rotary knife mill shredding systems. The NSA has a maximum particle size regulation for shredded paper material that is passed through a disintegrator or rotary knife mill, which typically does not exceed 3 mm (1/8 inch) square. This means that material exiting a disintegrator is the appropriate size for compression into paper briquettes, as opposed to strip-cut shredders which produce long sheets of paper.

After being processed through the disintegrator, paper particles are typically passed through an air system to remove dust and unwanted magnetic materials before being sent into the briquettor. The air system may also be responsible for regulating moisture content in the waste particles, as briquetting works optimally within a certain range of moisture. Studies have shown that the optimal moisture percentage for shredded particles is 18% for paper and 22% for wheat straw.

=== Environmental impact ===
Briquetted paper has many notable benefits, many of which minimize the impact of the paper waste generated by a shredding system. Several manufactures claim up to 90% volume reduction of briquetted paper waste versus traditional shredding. Decreasing the volume of shredded waste allows it to be transported and stored more efficiently, reducing the cost and fuel required in the disposal process.

In addition to the cost savings associated with reducing the volume of waste, paper briquettes are more useful in paper mills to create recycled paper than uncompressed shredded material. Compressed briquettes can also be used as a fuel for starting fires or as an insulating material.

== Safety ==
Experts generally warn that charcoal burners are not to be used in enclosed environments to heat homes, due to the danger of carbon monoxide poisoning.

== See also ==
- Smokeless fuel
- Wood briquette
