= Wood briquette =

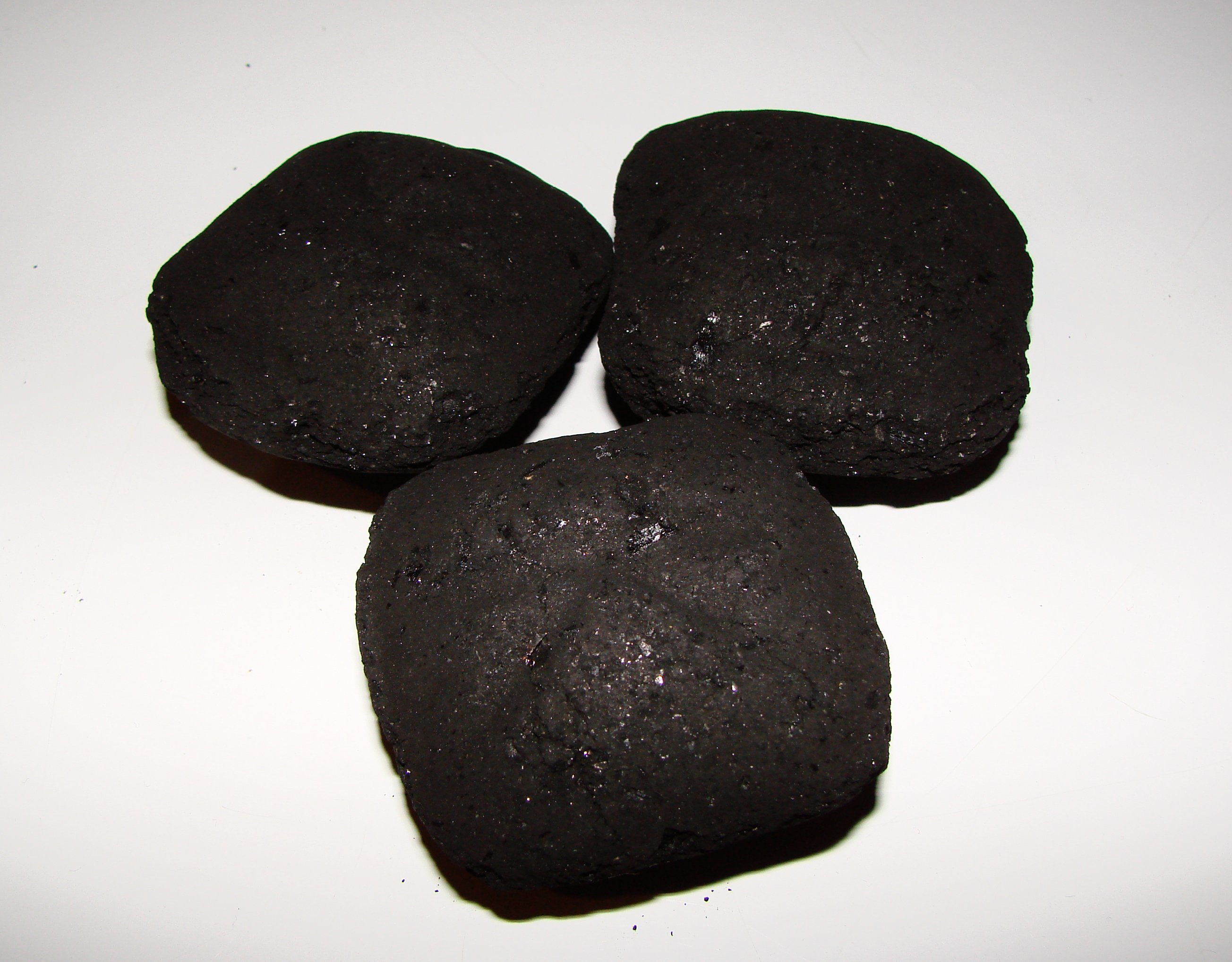
Charcoal Briquette

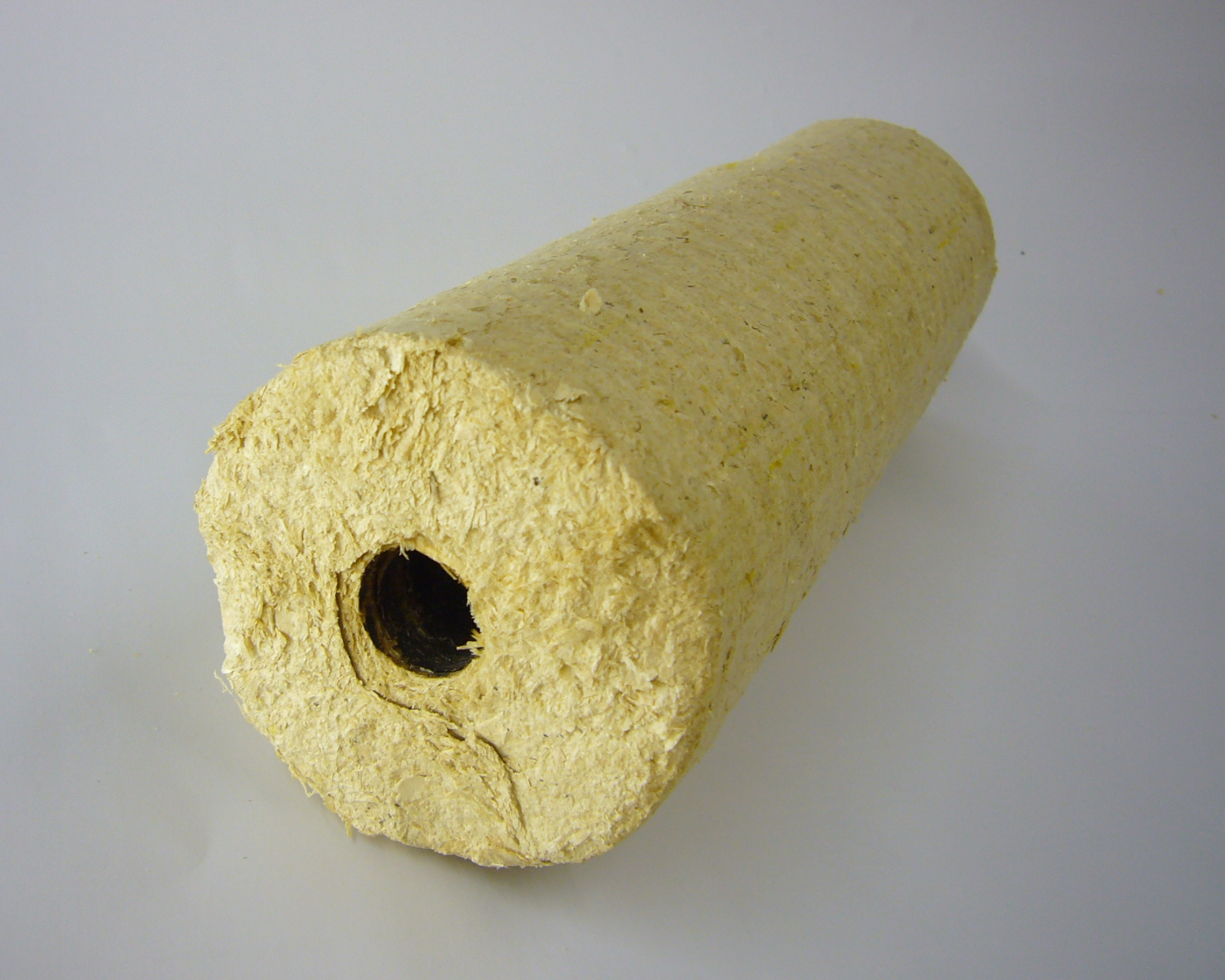
A tubular type of wood briquette

Wood briquettes are a fuel source made out of dried, compacted wood. They are made from wood waste or byproducts and machine-compressed into a log or block shape, generally without added ingredients, though they can have added materials like peat, bracken, or coffee. Briquettes in general can be made out of any biomass material.

== Fuel density and ash, sulfur, and moisture content ==
Wood briquettes' ash and sulfur content varies. Some pure wood briquettes with the bark removed can have as low as an 0.3% ash content, while briquettes with added materials can have up to a 7% ash content. Briquettes have a substantially higher energy content than logs per cubic foot due to their density, which means they take up less storage space and release more heat per lb. than logs. The low moisture content of about 10% leads to an energy content of around 5.0 kWh per kg depending on the type of wood and the compression.

== See also ==
- Wood fuel
- Wood pellet

== Sources ==
- Elcombe Firewood. "Using Briquettes in your stove." Elcombe firewood, elcombefirewood.co.uk/tip/using-briquettes-stove/. Accessed 29 Apr. 2021.
- "What are briquettes?" Wood Fuel Direct, www.woodfuel-direct.co.uk/what-are-briquettes. Accessed 7 May 2021.
- "Our Indispensable Guide to Briquettes." Wood Fuel Cooperative, 4 June 2020, www.woodfuel.coop/wood-fuel-guides/guide-to-briquettes/.
