= East Asian coal briquettes =

Type of coal briquette

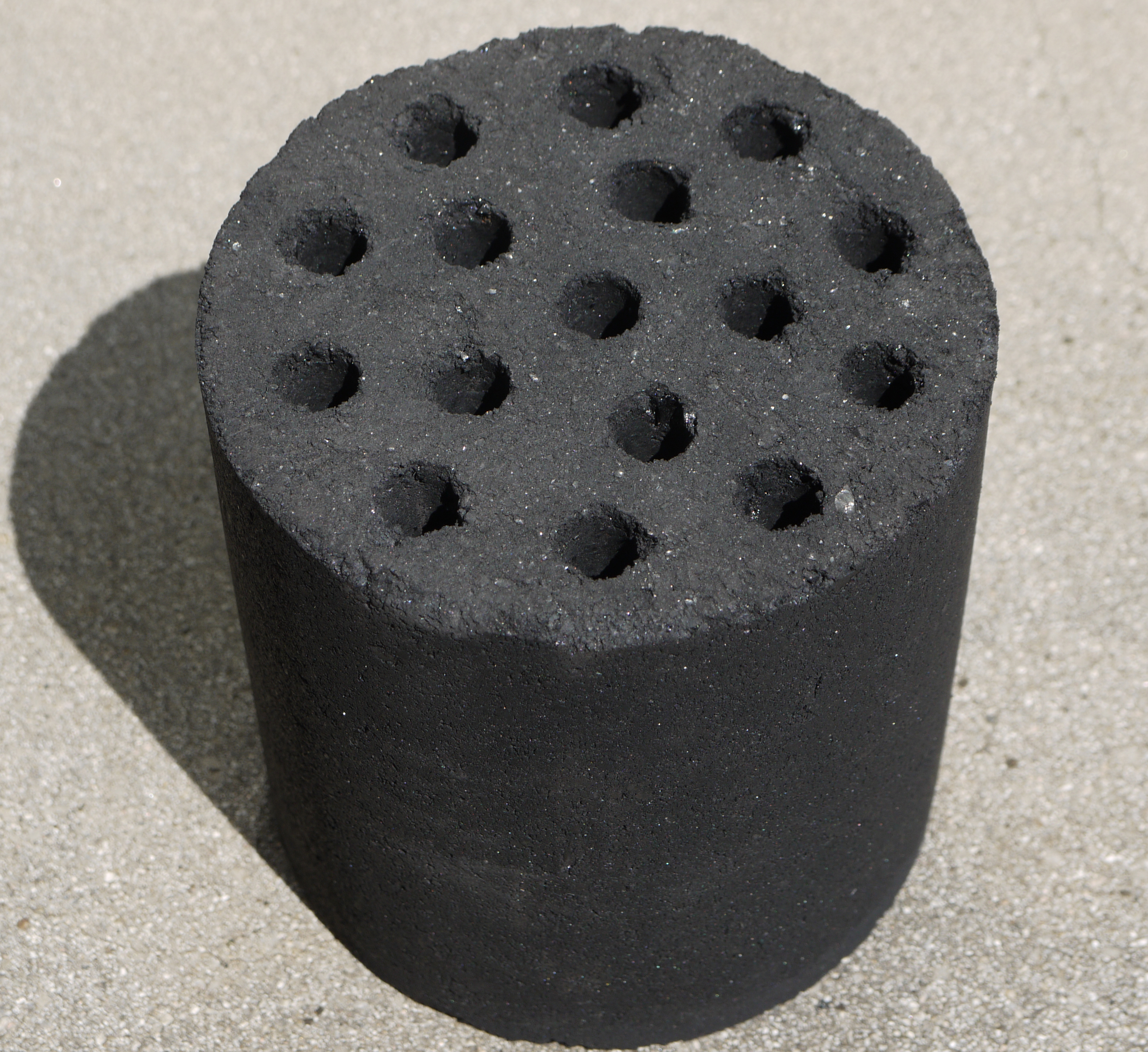

Japanese name
- Kanji: 煉炭/練炭
- Kana: れんたん
Transcriptions
- Romanization: Rentan

Chinese name
- Traditional Chinese: 蜂窩煤
- Simplified Chinese: 蜂窝煤
- Literal meaning: Beehive coal
Transcriptions
Standard Mandarin
- Hanyu Pinyin: Fēngwōméi
- Wade–Giles: Feng-Wo-Mei

Korean name
- Hangul: 연탄
- Hanja: 練炭
- Literal meaning: Kneaded coal
Transcriptions
- Revised Romanization: yeontan
- McCune–Reischauer: yŏnt'an

North Korean name
- Chosŏn'gŭl: 련탄

East Asian coal briquettes (Japanese: 練炭, Hepburn: rentan), also known by the names yeontan (Korean: 연탄) or fēngwōméi (simplified Chinese: 蜂窝煤; traditional Chinese: 蜂窩煤, literally "beehive coal"), are coal briquettes used across East Asia for home cooking and residential home heating purposes. They were first invented in Japan, then propagated through the rest of East Asia in the early 20th century, although their usage is now uncommon in contemporary Japan and South Korea.

Made from a mixture of lignite coal dust and a gluing agent that keeps the dust particles together, they became a popular alternative to firewood and natural coal because they come in a consistent size and stack easily. In South Korea, there are 5 standard sizes for the briquettes, and the 2nd standard was widely used in households.

The 2nd standard briquette is cylindrical in shape, weighs 3.5 kilograms (7.7 lb), and is about 20 cm (7.9 in) in height and 15 cm (5.9 in) in diameter. The standard briquette has 22 holes formed into it to facilitate steady, efficient burning, and a household typically uses one to three briquettes per day in the winter. A new briquette can be placed on one that has been burned halfway to extend the burn time.

In older South Korean homes, the same fire used for cooking also serves to heat the house, through a radiant underfloor heating system called ondol.

== History by region ==
=== Korea ===
Introduced to Korea from Japan in the 1920s, yeontan rose in popularity following the Korean War. By 1988, 78% of South Korean households used yeontan, but this fell to 33% by 1993 as people switched to oil and gas boilers, and was estimated to be used by just 2% of households by 2001. The boilers reduced the risk of carbon monoxide poisoning, which was a major cause of death in coal-heated houses.

Earlier briquettes used to have 9 holes. Later on, 19 holes used to be most common, but nowadays 22 holes is most common.

A number of suicides in South Korea have seen the use of yeontan for carbon monoxide poisoning.

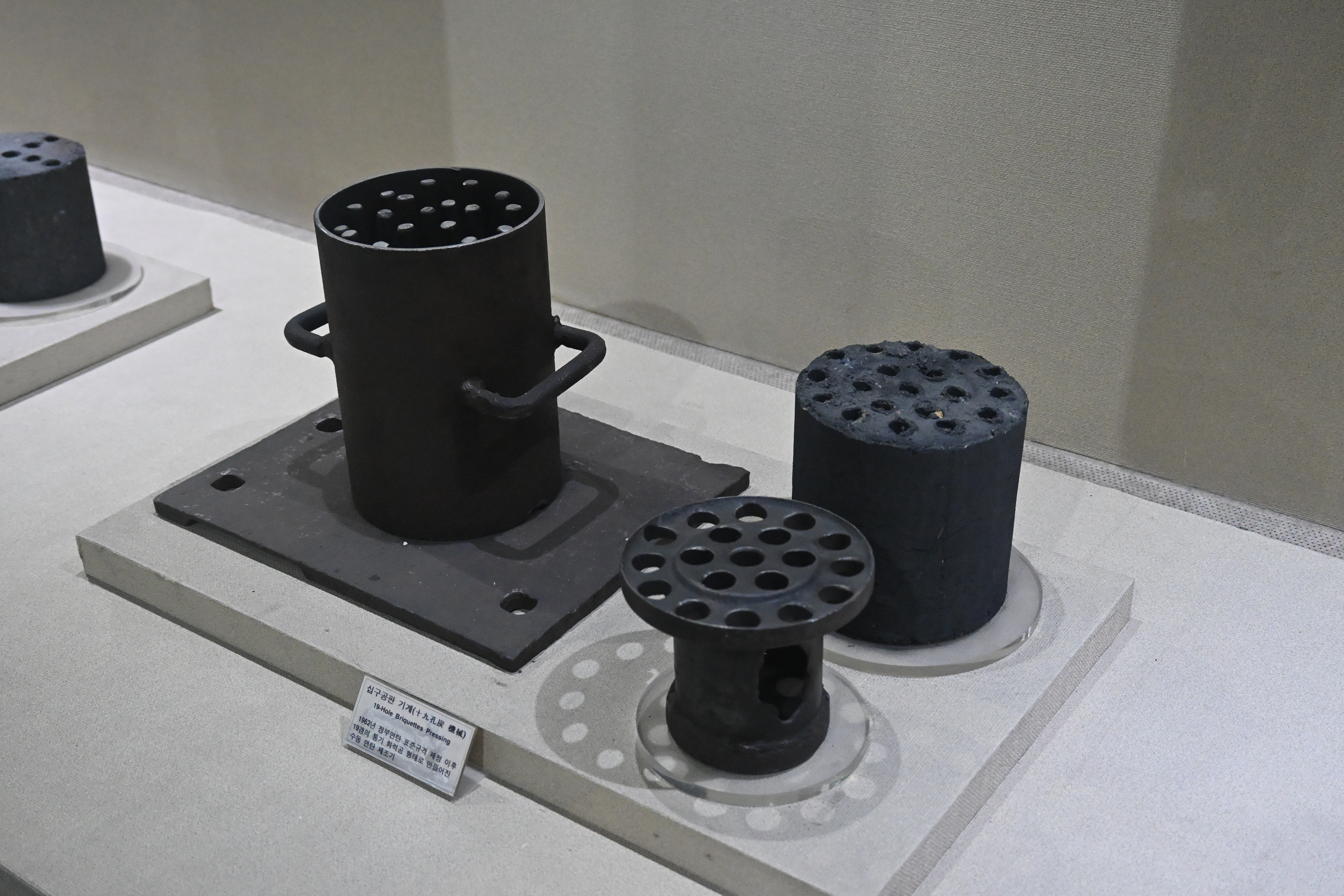
19-hole yeontan template and yeontan (9-hole yeontan visible in corner)

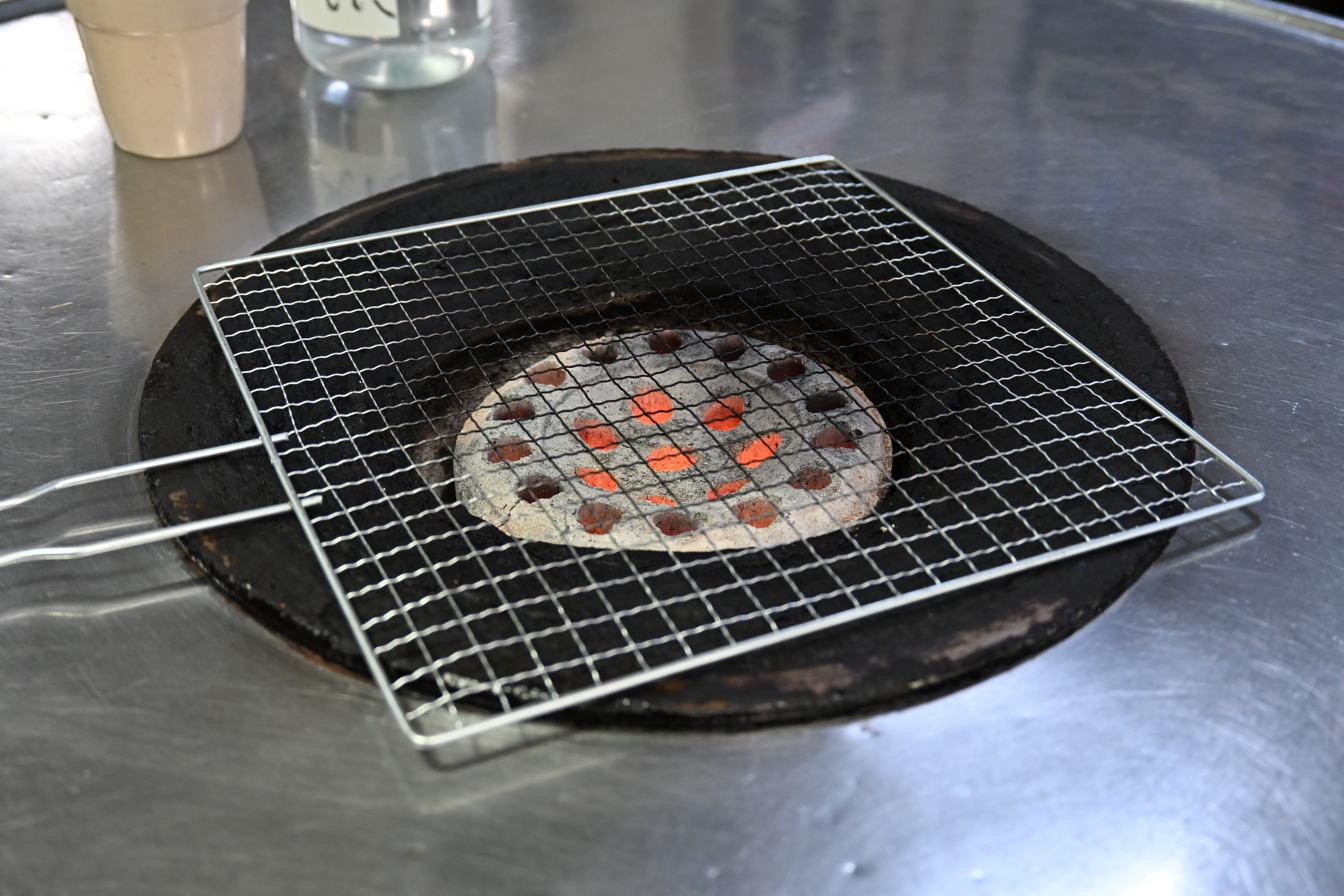
22-hole yeontan in use

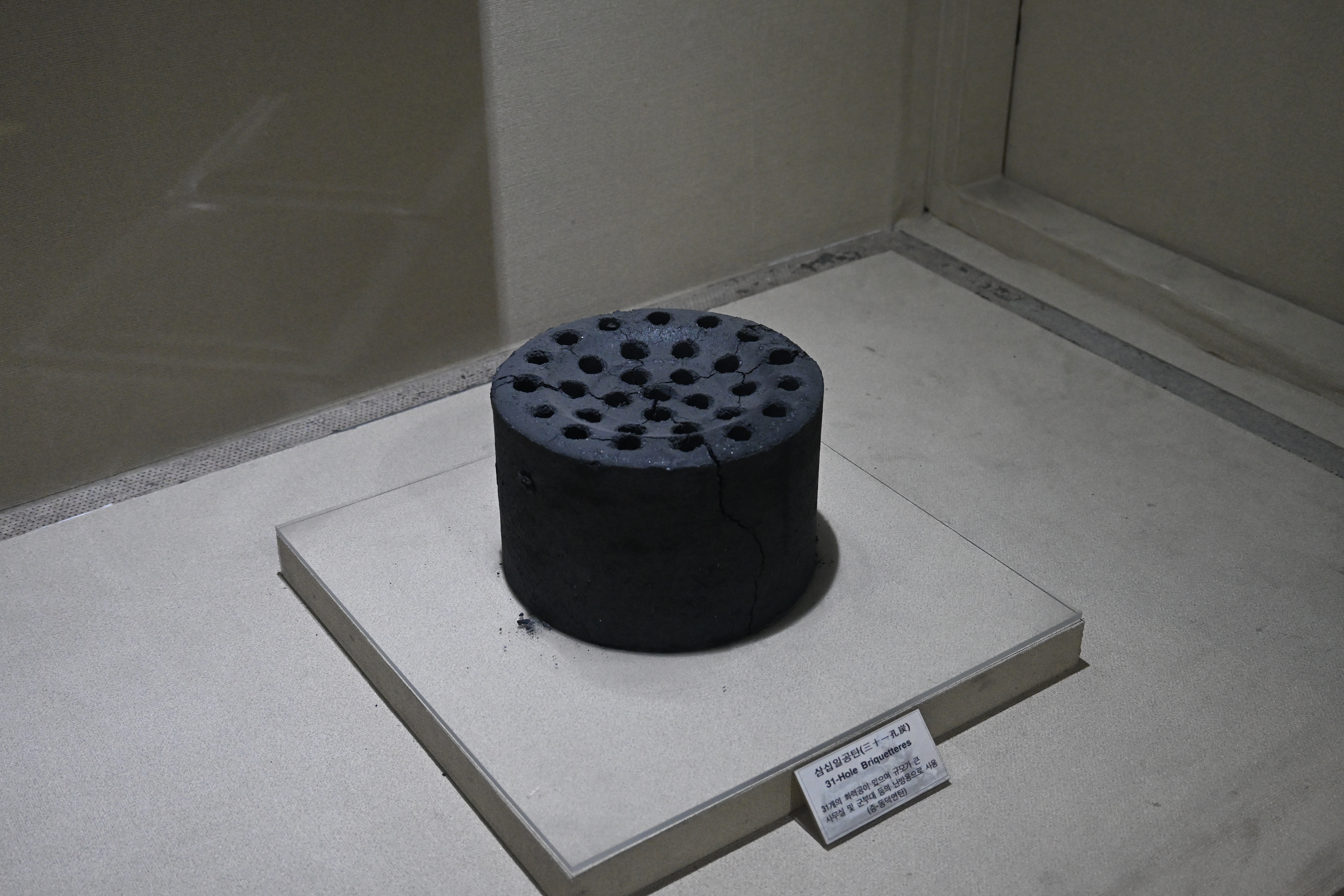
31-hole yeontan

== See also ==
- Binchōtan, another Japanese charcoal
