= List of English words of French origin (A–C) =

The pervasiveness of words of French origin that have been borrowed into English is comparable to that of borrowings from Latin.

== A ==
- abaisse
- abandon
- abandonment
- abase (Old Fr. abaissier)
- abash (Old Fr. esbaïr)
- abate (Old Fr. abatre, compare modern Fr. abattre)
- abatement (Old Fr. abatement, compare modern Fr. abattement)
- abatis
- abattoir
- abbreviation, (Fr. abréviation)
- abdication
- abet (Old Fr. abeter)
- abeyance (Anglo Fr. abeiance, from Old Fr. abeance)
- abhor (Fr. abhorrer)
- ability (Old Fr. ableté, compare modern Fr. habileté with restoration of initial h of Latin habilitas)
- abject
- abjection
- abjuration
- abjure (Fr. abjurer)
- ablation (Fr. ablation)
- ablative
- able, from Old French, compare modern Fr. habile or capable
- ablution
- abnormal compare anormal
- aboard (Middle Fr. à bord)
- abolish, compare abolir
- abolition
- abominable
- abomination
- abound
- abrasion
- abrasive, Fr. abrasif, abrasive(fem.)
- abridge, Fr. abréger
- abrogation
- abrupt
- absence
- absent
- absolute, from Middle French, compare modern Fr. absolu
- absolution
- absorb (Fr. absorber)
- abstain (Old Fr. abstenir)
- abstention
- abstinence
- abstinent
- absurd
- absurdity (Fr. absurdité)
- abundance (Old Fr. abundance, modern Fr. abondance)
- abundant
- abuse (Fr. abuser)
- abusive (Fr. abusif, abusive(fem.) )
- abut (Old Fr. abouter)
- acceleration (Fr. accélération)
- accent (Fr. accent)
- accept (Fr. accepter)
- acceptable
- acceptance
- access (Fr. accès)
- accessible
- accession
- accident
- acclamation
- acclimate (Fr. acclimater)
- accolade
- accommodation
- accompaniment (Fr. accompagnement)
- accompany (Old Fr. acompaignier, modern Fr. accompagner)
- accomplice (Old Fr. complice)
- accomplish (Old Fr. acomplir, modern Fr. accomplir)
- accord
- accordance (Old Fr. accordance)
- accost
- accoucheur
- account (Old Fr. acont)
- accountant (Old Fr. acuntant)
- accoutre or accouter
- accoutrements
- accredit
- accreditation
- accrue
- accumulation
- accusation
- accusative (Old Fr. accusatif)
- accuse
- accustom (Old Fr. acostumer, modern Fr. accoutumer)
- ace, (Old Fr. as)
- acerbity, (Middle Fr. acerbité)
- acetic, (Fr. acétique)
- achieve, (Old Fr. achever)
- achievement, (Fr. achèvement)
- acid, (Fr. acide)
- aconite, (Fr. aconit)
- acquaint, (Old Fr. acointier)
- acquaintance, (Old Fr. acointance)
- acquiesce, (Middle Fr. acquiescer)
- acquiescence, (Middle Fr. acquiescence)
- acquire, (Old Fr. aquerre)
- acquisition
- acquit (Old Fr. acquitter)
- across (Anglo Fr. an cros)
- act (Old Fr. acte)
- action
- activity, (Middle French activité)
- actual, (Old French actuel)
- acuity, (Middle French acuité)
- adage
- adapt, (Middle French adapter)
- adaptation
- addition
- address
- adhere
- adherence
- adhesion
- adhesive, compare adhésif or feminine form adhésive
- adieu, which literally means "to God" (à Dieu), farewell
- adjective, compare adjectif
- adjoin
- adjourn (Old French ajourner)
- adjudge (Old French ajugier, compare modern French adjuger)
- adjust (Old French ajoster, compare modern French ajuster)
- administer (Old French aministrer, compare modern French administrer)
- administration
- admirable
- admiral (Old French amiral)
- admiration
- admire
- admissible
- admission
- admonish (Old French amonester, compare modern French admonester)
- admonition
- adolescence
- adolescent
- adopt
- adoption
- adorable
- adoration
- adore
- adorn (Old French aourner)
- adornment (Old French aournement)
- adroit
- adulation
- adultery (Old French avoutrie or aoulterie, compare modern Fr. adultère)
- advance (Old French avancer)
- advancement (Old French avancement)
- advantage (Old French avantage)
- advantageous
- adventure, (Old French auenture, compare modern Fr. aventure)
- adventurous, (Old French aventuros, compare modern Fr. aventureux)
- adversary, (Anglo French adverser, from Old Fr. adversier, compare modern Fr. adversaire)
- adverse (Old French avers, compare modern Fr. adverse)
- adversity (Anglo French aduersite, from Old Fr. aversite, compare modern Fr. adversité)
- advertisement, (French avertissement [warning])
- advice, (Old French avis [opinion])
- advise, (Old French aviser [give one's opinion])
- advocacy, (Old French advocacie)
- advocate (Old French avocat [attorney or lawyer])
- aeroplane (French aéroplane)
- affability (French affabilité)
- affable
- affair, (Anglo-Norman afere, from Old Fr. afaire or à faire, compare modern Fr. affaire)
- affection
- affiance (Old French afiancer)
- affiliation
- affinity, (Old French afinité, compare modern Fr. affinité)
- affirm, (Old French afermer, compare modern Fr. affirmer)
- affirmation
- affirmative
- affix (Middle French affixer, from Old Fr. afichier, compare modern Fr. afficher)
- afflict
- affliction
- affluence
- affluent
- affront
- afraid p.p. of afray (Anglo French afrayer, from Old Fr. esfreer, compare modern Fr. effrayer)
- agate
- age
- agent provocateur
- aggrandisement Fr. agrandissement
- aggravation
- aggression, compare agression
- aggrieve, (Old Fr. agrever, compare modern Fr. aggraver)
- agile
- agility
- à gogo, or in abundance
- agrarian
- agree (Old Fr. agreer, compare modern Fr. agréer ["to accept" or "to please"])
- agreeable, compare modern Fr. agréable
- agreeance (Old Fr. agreance)
- agreement (Old Fr. agreement, compare modern Fr. agrément [authorization or amenity])
- ague
- aid (Old Fr. aide)
- aileron
- aim (Old Fr. esmar)
- air
- aisle
- à la, in the style of...
- à la carte
- à la mode
- alamode
- alarm
- alas, from Old French phrase "ha, las!", compare modern Fr. hélas
- alcove
- alert
- alien (Old Fr. alien)
- alienation (Middle Fr. alienation)
- align, (Middle Fr. aligner)
- alignment, (French alignement)
- allegation
- allege
- allegiance (Anglo French legaunce, from Old Fr. legeance, compare modern Fr. allégeance)
- allemande
- alley compare allée
- alliance
- allocation
- allot (Old Fr. aloter)
- allotment Fr. alotement
- allow (Old Fr. alouer)
- allowable (Old Fr. alouable)
- allowance (Old Fr. alouance)
- alloy (Anglo Fr. alai, from Old Fr. aleier)
- allude
- allure
- ally (Old Fr. alier)
- almoner (Old Fr. almosnier, compare modern Fr. aumônier)
- alter
- alteration
- alum
- amass
- amateur
- ambassador
- amber
- ambergris
- ambiance
- ambience
- ambiguity
- ambiguous
- ambition
- amble (Old Fr. ambler)
- ambulance
- ambuscade
- ambush (Old Fr. embuscher)
- amelioration
- amenable
- amend
- amendment
- amends
- amenity
- amerce
- ami
- amiable
- amity
- ammunition, from munition
- amorous, from Old French, compare modern Fr. amoureux
- amortise
- amount
- amour
- ampere
- ample
- amplify
- amplitude
- ampoule
- ampul
- amulet (Middle Fr. amulette)
- amuse
- amusement
- ancestor (Old Fr. ancestre, compare modern Fr. ancêtre)
- ancestral
- ancestry
- ancien regime
- ancient
- andiron (Old Fr. andier)
- andouille
- angle
- anguish (from Old French anguisse, now angoisse)
- anime Fr. animé
- animosity
- anisette
- annals (Old Fr. annales)
- annelid
- annex, (Old Fr. annexer)
- annihilation
- announce
- announcement
- annoy, from Old French anoier, modern Fr. ennuyer
- annoyance
- annual (Old Fr. annuel)
- annuity (Old Fr. annuité)
- annul (Old Fr. annuler)
- annunciation (Fr. annonciation)
- anoint (Old Fr. enoint, p.p. of enoindre, compare modern Fr. oindre)
- antecedent, compare antécédent
- antique
- antiquity (Old Fr. antiquitet, compare modern Fr. antiquité)
- antler (Anglo-Fr. auntiler, from Old Fr. antoillier, modern Fr. andouiller)
- anus (Old Fr. anus)
- apart (Old Fr. à part)
- apartment, Fr. appartement
- apercu, Fr. aperçu
- aperitif, Fr. apéritif
- aplomb
- appall (Old Fr. apalir, compare modern Fr. pâlir)
- appanage (Old Fr. apanage)
- apparel, (Old Fr. apareillier, compare modern Fr. appareil)
- apparent
- apparition
- appeal
- appear
- appearance
- appease
- appeasement
- appellant
- appellation
- appellee
- apperception
- appertain
- appetence
- appetite
- application
- applique
- apply (Old Fr. aplier, compare modern Fr. appliquer [to implement])
- appoint
- appointee
- appointment
- apportion
- appose
- appraise
- appreciable
- appreciation
- apprehend
- apprise
- approach
- approbation
- appropre
- approvance
- approve
- appurtenance
- appurtenant
- apricot (Fr. abricot, from Port. albricoque, from Arabic al-birquq)
- apron (Old Fr. naperon)
- apropos (Fr. à propos)
- aquarelle
- aquatic
- aqueous
- arabesque
- arable
- arbalest
- arbitrage
- arbitration
- arbitrator
- arbiter
- arbor
- arbour
- arc
- arcade
- arch
- archer
- archery
- ardent
- ardour
- are
- arête
- argent (Fr. argent)
- argot
- argue, (Old French arguer)
- argument
- argumentation
- aridity
- arm [weapon] (Old French arme)
- armagnac
- armament
- armature
- armistice
- armoire
- armorer
- armour
- army
- arraign
- arraignment
- arrange
- arrangement
- arras
- array
- arrearage
- arrears
- arrest, from Old Fr. arester
- arrive
- arrogance
- arrogant
- arrondissement
- arsenal
- arsenic
- arson
- art
- art brut
- art deco
- art nouveau
- artesian
- article
- articulation
- artifice
- artificial
- artillery
- artisan
- ascendant
- ascertain
- ascribe (Old Fr. ascrivre)
- ashlar (Old Fr. aiseler)
- asine
- askance (Old Fr. à escone)
- asp (Middle Fr. aspe, modern Fr. vipère aspic)
- asperity
- aspic
- aspirant
- aspire
- assail
- assailant
- assassin (Fr. assassin, from Arabic hashishiyyin [hashish users])
- assault
- assay
- assemblage
- assemble
- assembly
- assent
- assertion
- assess (Anglo Fr. assesser)
- assessor (Old Fr. assessour, compare modern Fr. assesseur)
- assets (Anglo Fr. asetz, from Old Fr. assez [enough])
- assign
- assignation
- assignee
- assignment
- assist
- assistance
- assistant
- assize
- assonance
- assort
- assuage
- assume
- assurance
- assure
- astonish
- astray
- atelier
- attach
- attaché
- attachment
- attack
- attain
- attainder
- attainment
- attempt
- attend
- attendance
- attendant
- attentive
- attest
- attestation
- attire
- attitude
- attorn
- attorney (Old Fr. atorné [appointed] p.p. of aturner)
- attraction
- attractive
- attribution
- aubade
- aubain
- aubergine
- auburn
- au courant
- audible
- audience
- audition
- auditor
- au fait
- augment
- augmentation
- augmentative
- au naturel
- au pair
- aunt (Anglo Fr. aunte, from Old Fr. ante, compare modern Fr. tante)
- aureole
- auspices
- auteur
- author (Old Fr. auctor, compare modern Fr. auteur)
- authorise
- authority
- autumn
- avail
- avalanche
- avant
- avarice
- avaricious
- avaunt
- avenge
- avenue
- aver
- average
- averment
- avert
- aviation (Fr. aviation)
- aviator
- avid (Fr. avide)
- avidity
- avocet
- avoid (Old Fr. evuider)
- avoirdupois
- avouch
- avow (Old Fr. aveu)
- await (Anglo Fr. awaitier, from Old Fr. agaitier)
- award (Anglo Fr. awarder, from Old Fr. esguarder)
- azimuth (Old Fr. azimut, from Arabic as-sumut)
- azure (Old Fr. azur, from Arabic (al)-lazaward, from Persian lajward)

== B ==
- baba au rhum
- baboon (Fr. babouin)
- babouche (Fr. babouche, from Arabic babush, from Persian papush)
- baccarat
- bachelor (Old Fr. bacheler)
- bacon (Old Fr. bacon)
- badinage
- bagatelle
- baggage, (Old Fr. bagage)
- baguette (Fr. baguette, from Italian bacchetta)
- bail (Old Fr. baillier)
- bailey
- bailiff
- baize
- balance
- baldric (Old Fr. baldre, compare modern Fr. baudrier)
- bale (Old Fr. bale, from Germanic)
- baleen
- ballad (Fr. ballade, from Old Provençal ballada)
- ballet (Fr. ballet, from Italian balletto)
- ballon
- balloon (Fr. ballon)
- balm (Old Fr. basme, compare modern Fr. baume)
- baluster (Fr. balustre, from Italian balaustro)
- balustrade (Fr. balustrade, from Italian balaustrata)
- banal
- banality
- band, (Middle Fr. bande)
- bandage
- bandeau
- bandolier
- bandy
- banish (Old Fr. banir, from Frankish *bannjan)
- bank (Old Fr. banque, from Old Italian banca, from Germanic)
- banner
- banquet
- banquette
- bar (Old Fr. barre)
- barb (Old Fr. barbe)
- bargain (Old Fr. bargaignier)
- barge
- bark [small ship] (Middle Fr. barque)
- baron (Old Fr. baron, from Frankish baro)
- baroness
- baroque
- barque
- barracks
- barrage
- barratry
- barre
- barrel (Old Fr. baril)
- barren, (Old Fr. baraigne)
- barret
- barrette
- barricade
- barrier
- barter (Old Fr. barater)
- basil
- basin
- basket
- basset (hound)
- bassinet
- bassoon
- bastard
- baste [sew] (Old Fr. bastir)
- bastion
- bate (Old Fr. batre, compare modern Fr. battre)
- baton
- battalion (Middle Fr. bataillon, from Italian battaglione)
- batten (Fr. baton)
- batter
- battery
- battle (Old Fr. bataille)
- battlement
- bauble
- baud
- bauxite
- bay, compare baie
- bayonet, compare baïonnette
- beagle (Fr. bagle)
- beak, (Old Fr. bec)
- beast (Old Fr. beste, compare modern Fr. bête)
- beatification
- beatitude
- beau, a lover or a dandy
- beau idéal
- beau monde
- beauty (Old Fr. beauté)
- beaux arts, fine arts
- bec de corbin
- bechamel
- beef (Old Fr. buef, compare modern Fr. boeuf)
- beef bourguignon
- beggar (Old Fr. begart)
- begonia
- beige
- beignet
- beldame
- belfry
- belle
- benefice (Fr. bénéfice)
- beneficial
- benefit (Anglo-Fr. benfet, compare modern Fr. bienfait)
- benevolent
- benign
- benignity
- benison
- benzoin
- berate
- berceuse
- beret, compare béret
- bergamot
- berline
- berm (Fr. berme, from Old Dutch baerm)
- beryl (Old Fr. beryl, from anc. Greek berullos, from Sanskrit vaidurya)
- bestial
- bête noire
- betray
- bevel
- beverage (Anglo-Fr. beverage, from Old Fr. boivre [to drink], compare modern Fr. Wikt:breuvage)
- bevy
- bezant
- bezel
- bezique
- bias
- bibelot
- bice (short form of Fr. bleu bis [brownish-grey blue])
- bicycle, compare bicyclette > vélo
- bidet
- bigamy
- bigot
- bigotry
- bijou
- bikini
- bile
- bilge
- biliary
- bilious
- billet
- billiards Fr. billiard, dim. of Old Fr. bille [stick of wood], from Gaulish *bilia [tree]
- billion
- binocular
- biscuit
- bison
- bisque
- bistro
- bittern
- bituminous
- bivouac
- bizarre
- blame
- blanch
- blancmange
- blandish
- blank (Old Fr. blanc)
- blanket, from Old French blanchet (originally "a white cloth")
- blasé
- blazon
- blemish
- bleu cheese
- blister
- bloc
- block
- blond
- blonde
- blouse
- bludgeon
- blue Old Fr. blo, from Frankish *blao
- bobbin
- boil (Old Fr. boilir)
- boisterous
- bombard (Fr. "bombarde")
- bombardier
- bon appétit
- bonbon
- bonhomie
- bon mot
- bonnet, from Old French, compare modern Fr. bonnet
- bonny
- bon ton
- bon viveur the French use bon vivant instead
- bon voyage
- boot
- booty
- borage
- borax
- bordello
- border
- bottle
- bouche
- boudoir
- bouffant
- bougainvillea
- bougie
- bouillabaisse
- bouillon
- boule
- boulevard
- boulevardier
- bound (v.) Old Fr. bondir
- bound (n.) Old Fr. bonde
- boundary
- bounty
- bouquet
- bourbon whiskey
- bourdon
- bourgeois
- bourgeoisie
- bourn
- bourse
- boutique
- boutonniere
- bowel
- bowls
- brace
- bracelet
- brach
- bracket
- braggart
- brail
- braise
- bran, from Old French bran or bren
- brandish, compare brandir
- brasserie
- brassiere, compare brassière, although the modern French for this is
- brave
- bravery
- brawn
- bray
- braze
- brazier
- bream
- brevet
- bribe
- brick
- bricolage
- brigade
- brigadier
- brigand
- brigantine
- brilliant, compare brillant
- brioche
- briquette
- broach
- brochure, Fr. brochure, from brocher - to stitch
- broderie anglaise, a type of embroidery
- broil
- broker
- bronze
- brooch
- brose
- brouhaha
- browse
- bruise Old Fr. bruisier
- bruit
- brulee
- brume
- brunet
- brunette
- brush
- brusque
- brut
- brute
- buccaneer Fr. boucanier
- bucket
- buckle, compare boucle
- buckler
- buckram
- budge
- budget, from Old Fr. bougette (a little purse)
- buff
- buffer
- buffet
- buffoon
- bugle
- bulb
- bulge
- bullet, from boulette, although the modern French for this is balle
- bulletin
- bullion
- bun
- burden compare bourdon
- bureau
- bureaucracy
- bureaucrat
- burette
- burgeon
- burgess
- burglar
- burin
- burlesque
- burnish
- bushel
- busk
- busker
- buskin
- bustard
- bustier
- butcher
- butchery
- butler
- butt
- butte
- button, Old Fr. boton, compare modern Fr. bouton
- buttress
- buzzard

== C ==
- cabal, compare cabale
- cabaret
- cabbage, Middle Fr. caboche "head"
- cabernet
- cabin
- cabinet
- cable
- cabochon
- cabotage
- cabriolet
- cache, compare cacher
- cachet
- cadastral
- caddie Scottish, from Fr. cadet
- cadence
- cadet
- cadre
- café
- café au lait
- cafetière
- cage
- cagoule
- cahier
- cahoots
- caisson
- caitiff
- cajole, compare cajoler
- cajolery
- calaboose
- calamine
- calamitous
- calamity
- calcify
- calendar Old Fr. calendier, compare modern Fr. calendrier
- calender
- calibre
- caliph Fr. caliphe, from Arabic khalîfa
- caliphate
- calm
- calmative
- calomel
- caloric
- calorie
- calque
- calumet
- calumny
- camaraderie
- camber
- camel
- camembert
- camisole Fr. camisole, from Provençal camisola
- camomile
- camouflage
- camp
- campaign, compare campagne
- camphor
- cancan
- canaille
- canapé
- canard
- canary
- cancel, Anglo-Fr. canceler, evolution of chanceler (1293) (to cross out)
- candy
- canteen
- cantle
- canton
- cantonment
- capable
- capacity
- caparison
- cape
- capillarity
- capitulation
- capon Old N. Fr. capon, compare modern Fr. chapon
- capote
- caprice
- capricious
- capsid
- capstan Old Fr. cabestant, from Old Provençal cabestan
- capsule
- captain Old Fr. capitaine
- caption
- captious
- capture
- car Old N. Fr. carre, from Latin carrus, from Gaulish karros
- carabineer
- carafe
- caramel
- carapace
- carat
- caravan
- caravel
- carbine
- carbon
- carbonate
- carbuncle
- carcass
- careen
- career (Fr. carrière)
- caress
- caribou
- caricature
- carillon
- carious
- carmine
- carnage
- carnation
- carnival
- carnivore
- carob, Fr. carobe, from Arabic kharrub
- carol
- carom
- carouse
- carousel
- carp
- carpenter
- carpentry
- carpet
- carrack
- carrefour
- carriage
- carrion
- carrot
- carry, Old N. Fr. carrier, (compare Fr. charrier)
- carter
- cartilage
- caryatid
- cascade
- case
- casein
- casement
- cash, Middle Fr. caisse
- cashew
- cashier
- cask
- casque
- casserole
- cassette
- cassis
- cassock
- castle, Old North Fr. castel, Old Fr. chastel, compare modern Fr. château
- castor
- casual (Old Fr. casuel)
- catch
- catchpoll
- catechumen
- category
- caterpillar
- cattle
- caudle
- caul
- cauldron
- caulk
- causative
- cause
- caution
- cavalcade
- cavalier
- cavalry, compare cavalerie
- cave
- cavern
- caviar
- cavil
- cavity
- cease Old Fr. cesser
- cedar Old Fr. cedre
- celadon
- celebrant
- celebration
- celebrity
- celerity
- celery
- celestial
- celibate
- cellar
- cellulite
- cellulose
- cement (Old Fr. ciment)
- cemetery
- cenacle
- cense, compare encenser
- censer (Old Fr. censier)
- censure
- centime (Fr. centime)
- centimetre
- centipede
- centralization
- centre (Old Fr. centre)
- centrifuge
- cere
- cereal
- cerebral
- ceremonious
- cerise
- certain
- certainty
- certificate
- certify
- certitude
- cession
- chafe
- chagrin
- chain
- chair, Old Fr. chaiere "chair", compare modern Fr. chaire "pulpit, throne"
- chaise, Fr. chaise, from Old Fr. chaiere
- chaise longue or sometimes chaise lounge
- chalet
- chalice, Old Fr. chalice or calice, compare modern Fr. calice
- challenge, Old Fr. chalonge (n.) and chalengier (v.)
- challenger, Anglo-Fr. chalengeour
- chamber
- chamberlain, Old Fr. chamberlenc, compare modern Fr. chambellan
- chambray
- chameleon, Old Fr. chameleon, from Latin chamaeleon, from Greek khamaileon
- chamfer
- chamois
- champagne
- champaign
- champertous
- champignon
- champion
- chance
- chancel
- chancellor
- chancery
- chancre
- chandelier
- chandler
- chandlery
- change
- changeable
- channel
- chanson
- chant
- chanteuse
- chanterelle
- chanticleer
- chantilly cream
- chapeau
- chapel
- chaperon
- chaplain
- chaplet
- chapter
- charabanc
- character, Old Fr. caractère
- charade
- charcuterie
- chard
- charette
- charge
- chariot
- charitable
- charity
- charlatan
- charlotte
- charm
- charnel
- chart
- charter
- chartreuse
- chase, Old Fr. chacier, compare modern Fr. chasser
- chaser
- chassé
- chasseur
- chassis
- chaste
- chasten
- chastise
- chastity
- chasuble
- château
- chateaubriand
- chatelaine
- chattel
- chauffeur
- cheat, Old Fr. escheat
- check, Old Fr. eschec
- checker, Old Fr. eschequier
- checkmate, Old Fr. eschec mat, from Persian shah mat, compare modern Fr. échec et mat
- cheer (Old Fr. chiere)
- chef, Fr. chef
- chemise
- chenille
- cheque
- cherish (Old Fr. chériss-)
- cherry, Anglo-Fr. and Old N. Fr. cherise, compare Old Fr. and modern Fr. cerise
- chess, Old Fr. esches
- chestnut
- cheval de frise
- cheval glass
- chevalier
- chevauchée
- chevron
- chez
- chic
- chicane
- chicanery
- chichi
- chickpea
- chicory
- chief, Old Fr. chief, compare modern Fr. chef
- chieftain, Old Fr. chevetain, compare modern Fr. cheftaine (only the feminine form remains)
- chiffon
- chiffonade
- chiffonier
- chignon
- chimera
- chimney
- chisel
- chitin
- chivalrous
- chivalry
- chive
- chock
- choice
- choir
- chowder
- chute
- cider
- cigarette
- cinquain
- circle
- circlet
- circuit
- circular
- circulation
- circulatory
- circumcise
- circumspection
- circumstance
- cirque
- cistern
- citadel
- citation
- cite
- citizen
- citron
- citronella
- city, Old Fr. cite, compare modern Fr. cité
- civet
- civil
- civilian
- civilisation
- civilize
- claim (Old Fr. clamer)
- clairvoyance
- clamor
- clamorous
- claque
- claret
- clarification
- clarify
- clarinet, compare clarinet
- clarion
- clarity
- class
- classic
- classify
- clause
- clavicle
- clavier
- clear
- clechy
- clef
- clement
- clementine
- clergy
- cliché
- client
- clientele
- climate
- clique
- cloak
- cloche
- clock
- cloisonne
- cloister
- close
- closet, from Old French closet
- closure
- cloture
- clyster
- coach
- coagulation
- coalition
- coast
- coat
- coat of arms
- cocaine
- cock
- cockade
- cockatrice
- cockle
- cocoon
- cocotte
- coddle
- code
- codeine
- codicil
- coefficient
- coercion
- coffer
- coffin
- cogent
- cogitation
- cogitative
- cognac
- cognisance
- cohabitation
- coherence
- coherent
- cohesion
- cohort
- coif
- coiffeur
- coiffeuse
- coiffure
- coil
- coin, Old Fr. coigne
- coinage
- coincide
- coincidence
- coincident
- collaboration
- collage
- collagen
- collar, Old Fr. coler
- collateral
- collation
- colleague
- collect
- collection
- collective
- collector
- college
- collegial
- collet
- collision
- colloid
- collusion
- cologne
- colonel, Middle Fr. coronel, compare modern Fr. colonel
- colonnade
- colossal
- colour or color
- colouration or coloration
- columbine
- column
- combat
- combatant
- combination
- combine
- combust
- combustible
- combustion
- comestible
- comet
- comfit
- comfiture
- comfort
- comfortable
- comforter
- comity
- command
- commandant
- commander
- commandment
- comme il faut
- commemoration
- commence
- commencement
- commendable
- commendation
- commensal
- comment
- commentary
- commerce
- commercial
- commiseration
- commissariat
- commission
- commissioner
- commode
- commodity
- common
- commotion
- communal
- commune
- communicable
- communication
- communicative
- communion
- communiqué
- community, Old Fr. comunalté, modern Fr. communauté
- commutation
- compact
- compaction
- companion
- company, Old Fr. compagnie
- comparable
- comparative
- compare
- comparison
- compartment
- compass
- compassion
- compatible
- compatriot
- compeer
- compel
- compendious
- compensable
- compensation
- compensatory
- compere
- compete
- competence
- competent
- competitor
- compilation
- compile
- compiler
- complain
- complainant
- complaint
- complaisance
- complaisant
- complement
- complete
- complex
- complexion
- complication
- complicity
- compliment, Fr. compliment
- compline
- comply
- comport
- comportment
- compose
- composite
- composition
- compost
- compote
- compound
- comprehension
- comprehensive
- compress
- compression
- comprise
- compromise
- compulsion
- compulsive
- compunction
- computation
- compute
- comrade, Fr. camarade
- concave
- concavity
- conceal
- concealment
- concede
- conceive
- concentric
- concept
- conception
- concern
- concert
- concession
- concessionaire
- concierge
- conciliation
- concision
- conclusion
- conclusive
- concomitance
- concord
- concordance
- concordant
- concordat
- concourse
- concretion
- concubinage
- concubine
- concurrence
- concurrent
- condemn
- condense
- condescend
- condescendence
- condign
- condiment
- condition
- conditional
- conduction
- conductor
- conduit
- confection
- confederacy
- confederation
- confer
- conference
- confess
- confession
- confessional
- confidant
- confidante
- confidence
- confident
- confine
- confinement
- confirm
- confirmation
- confiscation
- confit
- conflagration
- confluent
- conform
- conformity
- confound
- confraternity
- confrere
- confront
- confrontation
- confusion
- confute
- congeal
- congee
- congener
- congestion
- congratulation
- congregation
- congruity
- conjecture
- conjoin
- conjoint
- conjugal
- conjunction
- conjuncture
- conjuration
- conjure
- conjurer
- connect
- connection
- connoisseur, Old Fr. conoisseor, compare modern Fr. connaisseur
- conquer
- conqueror
- conquest
- consanguine
- consanguinity
- conscience
- conscientious
- conscription
- consecutive
- consent
- consequence
- consequent
- conservation
- conservative
- conservator
- conserve
- consider
- consideration
- consign
- consist
- consistence
- consistory
- consolation
- console
- consommé
- consonance
- consonant
- consort
- conspiracy
- conspirator
- conspire
- constable
- constance
- constant
- constellation
- consternation
- constitution
- constrain
- constraint
- construction
- constructive
- consuetude
- consul
- consult
- consultation
- consume
- consumption
- contagion
- contagious
- contain
- contaminate
- contemn
- contemplation
- contemplative
- contend
- content
- contention
- contentious
- contentment
- contest
- contestant
- contiguity
- continence
- continent
- contingent
- continual
- continuance
- continuation
- continue
- continuity
- contortion
- contour
- contra dance
- contraband
- contract
- contractile
- contraction
- contracture
- contradiction
- contrariety
- contrary
- contrast
- contravene
- contravention
- contretemps
- contribution
- contributor
- contrite
- contrition
- contrive
- control
- controller
- controverse
- controversy
- contumelious
- contumely
- contusion
- convalescence
- convalescent
- convenance
- convene
- convenient
- convent, Old Fr. convent, compare modern Fr. couvent
- convention
- conversant
- conversation
- converse
- conversion
- convert
- convertible
- convex
- convey, Anglo-Fr. conveier, from Old Fr. convoier, compare modern Fr. convoyer
- convive
- convivial
- convocation
- convoke
- convoy
- convulsive
- cooperation
- coordination
- cope
- coppice
- copulation
- copy
- coquet
- coquetry
- coquette
- coral
- corbel
- cord
- cordage
- cordial
- cordon
- cordwainer
- core
- coriander
- corm
- cormorant, Old Fr. cormarenc, compare Mod. Fr. cormoran
- corn [callus on the foot]
- cornelian, Old Fr. corneline, compare Mod. Fr. cornaline
- corner
- cornet
- corniche
- coronal
- coroner
- coronet
- corporal (n.) Middle Fr. corporal, from Italian caporale, compare Mod. Fr. caporal
- corporal (adj.) Old Fr. corporal, compare Mod. Fr. corporel
- corps
- corpse
- corpulence
- corpulent
- correct
- correction
- corrective
- correlation
- correspond
- corridor, Fr. corridor, from Italian corridore
- corrigible
- corrode
- corrosion
- corrosive
- corrupt, Old Fr. corropt
- corruptible
- corsage
- corsair
- corset
- cortege
- corvee
- corvette
- cost
- costal
- costive
- costume
- coterie
- cotillion
- cottage
- cotton, Old Fr. coton
- couch
- cougar
- coulee
- coulomb
- council
- counsel
- counsellor
- count (v.), Old Fr. cunte, from Latin computare, compare Mod. Fr. compter
- count (n.), Old Fr. conte, from Latin comitem, compare Mod. Fr. comte
- countenance
- counter
- counteract
- counterargument, counter+argument, compare contre-argument
- counterattack, counter+attack, compare contre-attaque
- counterbalance, counter+balance, compare contrebalancer
- counterculture, counter+culture, compare contreculture
- counterfeit, Old Fr. contrefait
- counterintelligence, counter+intelligence, compare contre-intelligence
- countermand, Old Fr. contremander
- counteroffer, counter+offer, compare contre-offre
- counterpart, Middle Fr. contrepartie
- counterpoint
- counterpoise, Old Fr. contrepois, compare Mod. Fr. contrepoids
- countersign, Middle Fr. contresigne
- countervail, Anglo-Fr. countrevaloir, from Old Fr. contrevaloir
- countess
- country, Old Fr. cuntree, compare Mod. Fr. contrée
- county, Anglo-Fr. counte, compare comté
- coup
- coup de grâce
- coupe
- couple
- couplet
- coupon
- courage, Old Fr. corage, compare Mod. Fr. courage
- courageous
- courant
- courgette
- courier
- course
- courser
- court
- court martial, Fr. cour martiale
- courteous
- courtesan
- courtesy
- courtier
- couscous, Fr. couscous, from Arabic kuskus
- cousin, Old Fr. cosin
- couture
- couturier
- covenant
- cover, Old Fr. covrir
- coverlet
- covert
- coverture
- covet
- covetous
- covey
- coward
- cowardice
- coy
- cramp
- crap
- crappie
- craps [game]
- crass
- cravat
- crayfish, Old Fr. crevice, compare Mod. Fr. écrevisse
- crayon
- cream
- creamery
- creation
- creator
- creature
- creche
- credit
- creditor
- credulity
- crème
- crème brûlée
- crème caramel
- crème de la crème
- crème de menthe
- crenel
- crenelate
- creole
- crêpe
- creperie
- crepuscule
- crescent
- crest
- cretin
- cretonne
- crevasse
- crevice
- crew
- cricket, Old Fr. criquet
- crime
- criminal
- criminality
- crinoline
- crochet
- crocket
- crocodile
- croissant
- crone
- croquet
- croquette
- crotch
- crotchet
- crouch
- croupier
- crouton, from the diminutive form of the old French word croust, (later to come into modern French as the word croûte), meaning 'crust'.
- crown, Anglo-Fr. coroune, from Old Fr. corone, compare Mod. Fr. couronne
- crozier
- cru
- crucial
- crucifix
- crucify
- crudités
- crudity
- cruel
- cruelty
- cruet
- crusade
- crusader
- crush
- crust, Old Fr. crouste, compare Mod. Fr. croûte
- cry, Old Fr. crier
- cuckold
- cuckoo
- cucumber
- cuirass
- cuisine
- cull
- culmination
- culotte
- culpable
- culprit
- cult, Fr. culte
- cultivation
- culture, Fr. culture
- cuneiform
- cupidity
- curable
- curation
- curative
- curb
- cure
- curette
- curfew, Old Fr. covrefeu, compare Mod. Fr. couvre-feu
- curie
- curiosity
- curious
- curlew
- currant
- current
- currier
- curry (v.)
- curry favor
- cursive
- cursory
- curtail
- curtain
- curtilage
- cushion
- custard
- custom, from Old Fr. coustume, compare modern Fr. coutume
- cutlass
- cutler
- cutlery
- cutlet
- cypress

== See also ==
- Influence of French on English
- French phrases used by English speakers
- Law French
- Glossary of fencing, (predominantly from French).
- Glossary of ballet (predominantly from French)
- Lists of English loanwords by country or language of origin
- List of English words of Gaulish origin
- List of English words of Latin origin
- List of English Latinates of Germanic origin
- Latin influence in English
- List of French words of Germanic origin
- List of French words of Gaulish origin
- List of French words of Arabic origin
