= Cypher =

Cypher may refer to:

== Arts and entertainment ==
- Cypher (French Group), a Goa trance music group
- Cypher (band), an Australian instrumental band
- Cypher (film), a 2002 film
- Cypher (...And Oceans album)
- Cypher (Spektr album)
- Cypher, a circle of b-boys who take turns dancing in the center in breakdancing
- Cypher, a circle of poets who take turns reciting poems in poetry slam
- Cypher, a circle of rappers who take turns freestyling or performing a freeverse in freestyle rap
- "Cypher." an indie/alternative artist

=== Video games ===
- The Cypher (video game), released in 1998
- Cypher (video game), released in 2012

=== Characters ===
- Cypher (Marvel Comics) (a.k.a. Doug Ramsey), a Marvel Comics character
- Cypher (DC Comics) (a.k.a. Avery Twombey), a DC Comics super-villain and adversary of Batman
- Cypher (Warhammer 40,000), a character in the Warhammer 40,000 universe
- Richard Cypher (also known as Richard Rahl), the protagonist of The Sword of Truth series
- Cypher, a Judas-like character in the film The Matrix
- Cypher Raige, a main character in the science fiction film After Earth
- Cypher, the title character of Johnny Cypher in Dimension Zero
- Cypher/Kerry Turner, a sidekick of the Christian superhero Bibleman
- Cypher, the sword-like weapon of Strider Hiryu, a character from the Strider Hiryu manga and various related videogames
- Cypher, a character in the H.I.V.E. book series
- Cypher, the female main antagonist of the film The Fate of the Furious
- Cypher (aka Amir El Amari), a character from Riot Games' Valorant
- Cypher, a playable "Cyber Trooper" (Mech), appearing in the Sega video game Cyber Troopers Virtual-On Oratorio Tangram

== Science and technology ==
- Cipher or cypher, in cryptography
- Cypher (query language), a declarative query language for graph databases
- Cypher stent, a type of drug-eluting stent
- Sikorsky Cypher, an unmanned aerial vehicle

== People ==
- Jon Cypher (1932-2026), American actor
- Julie Cypher (born 1964), American film director
- Cypher (gamer) (Alexey Yanushevsky, born 1990), Belarusian professional Quake player

== Other uses ==
- Royal cypher, in modern heraldry

== See also ==
- Monogram
- Cipher (disambiguation)
- Cyphers (disambiguation)
