= List of English words of French origin (S–Z) =

The pervasiveness of words of French origin that have been borrowed into English is comparable to that of borrowings from Latin.

== S ==
- sabayon
- sabbat
- sable
- sabot
- sabotage
- saboteur
- sabre
- sac
- saccade
- sacerdotal
- sachet
- sacrament, Old Fr. sacrament, compare Mod. Fr. sacrement
- sacramental
- sacré bleu
- sacred
- sacrifice
- sacrilege
- sacristy
- safe, Old Fr. sauf
- safeguard, Middle Fr. sauvegarde
- safety
- saffron
- sagacity
- sage
- saint
- salad
- salary
- saline
- salmagundi
- salmon
- salon
- saloon, compare salon
- salsify
- saltire
- saltpetre
- salutary
- salutation
- salvage
- salver
- samite
- sample, Old Fr. essample
- sanctify
- sanctimony
- sanctity
- sanctuary
- sandal
- sangrail
- sanguine
- sanitary
- sanity
- sans
- sap (v.)
- sapience
- sapient
- saponification
- sardine
- sardonic
- sash [window], Fr. châssis
- sashay, Fr. chassé
- satchel
- satellite
- satiety
- satin
- satiric
- satisfy
- sauce, Old Fr. sauce
- saucer
- sault
- sausage
- sauté
- sauterne
- savage, Old Fr. sauvage
- savant
- savate
- save, Anglo-Fr. sa(u)ver, from Old Fr. salver, compare Mod. Fr. sauver
- saveloy
- savior
- savor
- savory
- savvy, pidgin, from Fr. savez(-vous)
- saxifrage
- scabbard
- scaffold
- scald
- scale
- scallion
- scallop
- scantling
- scar
- scarab
- scarce
- scarcity
- scarification
- scarlet
- scavenger, Anglo-Fr. scawager, from Old N. Fr. escauwage
- scent
- schedule
- science
- scientific
- scimitar
- scion
- scissors
- sconce
- scorn
- scorpion
- scoundrel
- scourge
- scout, Old Fr. escouter
- screen, Anglo-Fr., from Old N. Fr. escren, compare Old Fr. escran and Mod. Fr. écran
- screw, Middle Fr. escroue
- script
- scrivener, Anglo-Fr scrivein, from Old Fr. escrivain compare Mod. Fr. écrivain
- scruple
- scrupulous
- scullery
- scullion
- sculpt
- scuttle
- seal, Old Fr. seel, compare Mod. Fr. sceau, sceller
- séance
- search, Old Fr. cerchier, compare Mod. Fr. chercher
- season, Old Fr. seison, compare Mod. Fr. saison
- seat
- secateurs
- second
- secrecy
- secret
- secretariat
- secretion
- sect
- section
- secular
- security
- sedentary
- sediment
- sedimentary
- sedition
- seditious
- seduction
- see (n.)
- seigneur
- seigniorage
- seisin
- seize
- semblance
- seminal
- sempiternal
- senate
- seneschal
- senile
- sense
- sensitive
- sensuality
- sentence, Old Fr. sentence
- sentiment, Fr. sentiment
- sentinel
- sepal
- separable
- separation
- septillion (from sept seven)
- sepulchre
- sepulture
- sequel
- sequence
- sequent
- sequester
- sequin
- serenade
- serenity
- serf (Old Fr. serf)
- serge
- sergeant or serjeant, from Old French, compare modern Fr. sergent
- serious
- sermon
- serolous
- serpent
- serpentine
- servant
- serve
- service
- serviceable
- serviette
- servitude
- sesame
- session
- set
- se-tenant
- sever
- several, Anglo-Fr. several, from Old Fr. seperalis
- severance
- severe
- severity
- sewer
- sex
- sexton
- shallop
- shallot
- shammy
- shanty
- shawm
- shay, corruption of chaise mistaken as a plural
- shivaree
- siege
- sign
- signal
- signature
- signet
- signification
- signify
- silage
- silence
- silhouette
- similar, Fr. similaire
- similarly
- similitude
- simnel
- simple, Old Fr. simple
- simplicity
- simplification
- simplify
- simulation
- simultaneity
- sincere
- sincerity
- single
- singular
- singularity
- sinister
- sir
- sire
- siren
- sirloin
- site
- situation
- size
- skein
- skew
- skiff
- skillet
- skim
- skink
- skirmish, Old Fr. escarmouche
- slander
- slat
- slate
- slave
- slender
- slice, Old Fr. esclis
- slot, Old Fr. esclot
- sluice
- soar
- sober, Old Fr. sobre
- sobriety, Fr. sobriété
- sobriquet
- sociable, Fr. sociable
- social, Fr. social
- society, Old Fr. société
- sociology
- socket
- sodality
- soigné
- soil
- soirée
- sojourn (Old Fr. sojorn)
- solace
- solder
- soldier
- sole
- solemn
- solemnity
- solemnize
- solicit, Old Fr. solliciter
- solicitation
- solicitor, Old Fr. solliciteur
- solicitude
- solid
- solidarity, Fr. solidarité
- solidary
- solidification
- solidify
- solidity
- solitaire
- solitude
- solstice
- soluble
- solution
- solvent
- sombre or somber, Fr. sombre
- somersault
- sommelier
- somnolence
- somnolent
- sonde
- sonnet
- sonority
- soporific
- sorb
- sorbet
- sorcerer
- sorcery
- sorrel
- sort, Old Fr. sorte
- sortie
- sot
- soubrette
- soubriquet
- soufflé
- souk, Fr. souk, from Arabic suq
- sound, (n.) Old Fr. son, (v.) Old Fr. sonder
- soup
- soupçon
- source
- souse
- souteneur
- souvenir
- sovereign, Old Fr. soverain, compare Mod. Fr. souverain
- sovereignty
- space, Old Fr. espace
- spacious
- spandrel
- spaniel, Old Fr. espagneul
- spavin
- spawn
- spay
- special
- speciality
- specific
- specificity
- specify
- spectacle
- spectre
- speculation
- speculative
- spice, Old Fr. espice, compare Mod. Fr. épice
- spinach
- spine, Old Fr. espine, compare Mod. Fr. épine
- spinney
- spiral
- spirit, Old Fr. espirit, compare Mod. Fr. esprit
- spiritual
- spirituality
- spleen
- splendour or splendor, Middle Fr. esplendour, compare Mod. Fr. splendeur
- spoil
- spool
- sport, Old Fr. desport, compare Mod. Fr. sport
- spouse
- sprite
- spume
- spurge
- spy, Old Fr. espier, compare Mod. Fr. épier
- squad, Fr. esquade
- squadron, Middle Fr. esquadron
- square
- squash
- squat
- squirrel
- stability
- stable
- stage, Old Fr. estage
- stagnant
- stallion
- stance
- stanch
- stanchion
- standard, Old Fr. estandard, compare Mod. Fr. étendard
- state, Old Fr. estat, compare Mod. Fr. état
- station
- statue
- statuette
- stature
- statute
- staunch
- stay
- stere
- steppe
- sterile
- stew
- stipe
- stipule
- stolid
- store
- story, Old Fr. estorie
- stour
- stout
- strain (v.)
- strait
- strange
- strangle
- stratify
- stray
- stress, Old Fr. estresse
- strident
- strife
- strive
- strop
- structure, Old Fr. structure
- stubble
- student
- study, Old Fr. estudier, compare Mod. Fr. étudier
- stuff, Old Fr. estoffe, compare Mod. Fr. étoffe
- stupefaction
- stupefy
- stupid, Middle Fr. stupide
- sturdy
- sturgeon, Old Fr. esturgeon
- suave
- subaltern
- subdue
- subject, Old Fr. suget, subget, compare Mod. Fr. sujet
- subjection
- sublime
- submission
- subordination
- subsequent
- subsidiary
- subsidy
- substance
- substantial
- substitution
- subterfuge
- subtle
- subtlety
- subvention
- subversion
- subvert
- succeed
- succession
- successor
- succinct
- succour
- succulence
- succulent
- succumb, Middle Fr. succomber
- sucrose
- sudden
- sue
- suede
- suet
- suffer, Old Fr. sufrir, compare Mod. Fr. souffrir
- suffice
- sufficient
- suffocation
- suffragan
- suffrage
- sugar
- suggestion
- suit
- suite
- suitor
- sullen
- sully
- sulphate
- sulphur
- sulphuric
- sultan
- sum
- sumac
- summer (horizontal beam)
- summit
- summon
- sumpter
- sumptuous
- superfluity
- superior
- superiority
- superlative
- supernal
- superposition
- superscript
- supersede
- superstition
- superstitious
- supper
- supplant
- supple
- suppliant
- supplication
- supply
- support, Old Fr. supporter
- suppose, Old Fr. supposer
- supreme
- surcease
- surcharge
- surcingle
- surcoat
- sure, Old Fr. sur, seur, compare Mod. Fr. sûr
- surety, Old Fr. seurté, compare Mod. Fr. sûreté
- surface
- surfeit
- surge
- surgeon, Anglo-Fr. surgien, from Old Fr. serurgien, cirurgien, compare Mod. Fr. chirurgien
- surgery, Anglo-Fr. surgerie, from Old Fr. serurgie, cirurgie, compare Mod. Fr. chirurgie
- surmise
- surmount, Old Fr. surmounter, compare Mod. Fr. surmonter
- surname, Anglo-Fr. surnoun later respelled, from Old Fr. surnom
- surpass
- surplice
- surplus
- surprise
- surreal
- surrender, Old Fr. surrendre
- surtax
- surveillance
- survey
- surveyor
- survive
- suspect
- suspend
- suspense, Old Fr. suspens
- suspension
- suspicion
- suspicious
- sustain
- sustenance
- sustentation
- suzerainty
- svelte
- swage, Old Fr. souage
- syrup

== T ==
- tabard
- tabby
- tabernacle
- tablature
- table
- tableau
- tablet
- tabor
- tacit
- taciturn
- tack
- tactile
- taffeta
- tail
- tailor, Old Fr. tailleor
- taint
- talc
- talent
- talisman
- tally
- talon
- talus
- tambour
- tambourine
- tamp
- tampion
- tampon
- tan
- tangerine
- tangible
- tanner
- tannery
- tannin
- tansy
- tantamount, Anglo-Fr. tant amount, from Old Fr. tant (as much) + amonte (amount)
- tap (v.)
- tapenade
- tapestry
- tapir
- tapis
- tardy
- tare
- target
- tarnish, Middle Fr. terniss-, from ternir
- tarot
- tart [pie], Old Fr. tarte
- tartan
- tartar, Old Fr. tartre
- tartare, Fr. tartare
- tartuffe
- task, Old North. Fr. tasque, Old Fr. tasche, compare Mod. Fr. tâche
- tassel
- taste, Old Fr. taster
- taupe
- tavern
- tawny, Anglo-Fr. tauné, from Old Fr. tané
- tax, Old Fr. taxer
- taxation
- taximeter, Fr. taximètre
- tay
- teat, Old Fr. tete
- tedious
- temerity
- temperance
- tempest, Old Fr. tempeste, compare Mod. Fr. tempête
- temple [anatomy]
- temporal, Old Fr. temporel
- temporize
- tempt, Old Fr. tempter, compare Mod. Fr. tenter
- temptation, Old Fr. temptation, compare Mod. Fr. tentation
- tenable
- tenacity
- tenant
- tench, Old Fr. tenche
- tend, Old Fr. tendre
- tender
- tendon, Middle Fr. tendon
- tendril
- tenebrous
- tenement
- tennis, Old Fr. tenez, to start the game
- tenon
- tenor
- tense
- tension
- tent
- tentative
- tenter
- tenure
- tercel
- term
- termagant
- terrace, Old Fr. terrasse
- terrain
- terrible
- terrier
- terrify
- terrine
- terror, Old Fr. terreur
- terse
- test
- testament
- tetany
- tete
- text
- texture
- tic
- ticket
- tier
- tierce
- tiffany
- tiger
- tigress
- till (n.)
- tillage
- tiller
- timbre
- timbrel
- timid
- timidity
- timocracy
- timorous
- tinsel
- tirade
- tisane
- tissue
- title
- titration
- titre
- titular
- toast
- toboggan
- tocsin
- tog
- toil
- toile
- toilet, Middle Fr. toilette
- toilette
- tole
- tolerable
- tolerance
- tolerant
- toleration
- tomb
- tonnage
- tonne
- tonneau
- tonsil
- tonsure
- tontine
- topaz
- toque
- torch
- torchere
- torment
- tormentor
- torrent
- torsades de pointes
- torsion
- tort
- tortfeasor
- tortious
- tortuous
- torture
- total
- toucan
- touch
- touche
- toupée
- tourbillon
- tout de suite or toot sweet, compare tout de suite
- towel, Old Fr. toaille
- trace
- track
- tradition
- traffic
- trail
- train
- trait
- traitor
- trammel
- trance
- tranche
- tranquil
- tranquillise
- tranquillity
- transaction
- transfigure
- transfix
- transform
- transformation
- transgress
- transgression
- transitivity
- transitory
- translation
- translator
- transmutation
- transmute
- transpiration
- transpire
- transport
- transpose
- transposition
- travail
- trave
- travel
- traverse
- travesty
- travois
- treacherous
- treachery
- treacle
- treason
- treasure
- treasury
- treat
- treatise
- treatment
- treaty
- treble
- trebuchet
- trefoil
- trellis
- tremble
- tremor
- trench
- trenchant
- trepan
- très
- trespass
- tress
- trestle
- trey
- triage
- trial
- triangle
- tribe, Old Fr. tribu
- tribulation
- tribunal
- trick
- tricolour
- tricot
- trifle
- trillion
- trimester
- trine
- trinity
- trip
- tripe
- trist
- trochanter
- trochee
- troop, Middle Fr. troupe
- trot
- troubadour
- trouble
- trounce
- troupe
- trousseau
- trout
- trove
- trowel
- troy
- truant
- truck (v.)
- truckle
- truculence
- truculent
- truffle
- trumeau
- trump
- trumpery
- trumpet
- truncheon
- trunk
- trunnion
- truss
- try, Old Fr. trier
- tryst
- tuba
- tube
- tuff
- tuffet
- tuft
- tuition
- tulip
- tulle
- tumbrel
- tumescence
- tumour
- tumult
- tumultuous
- tunic
- tunnel
- tunny
- turban
- turbine
- turbot
- turbulent
- tureen
- turmoil
- turn
- turpentine
- turpitude
- turquoise
- turret
- turtle
- tutor
- tutu

== U ==
- ubiquity
- ulcer
- ultramontane
- umber
- umbrage
- umbrageous
- umpire
- unanimity
- uncle
- unctuous
- unicorn
- uniform
- uniformity
- unify
- union
- unique
- unison
- unity
- universal
- universality
- universe
- university
- urbane
- urbanise
- urbanity
- urchin
- urgent
- usable
- usage
- use
- usher
- usual
- usurer
- usurious
- usurp
- usurpation
- usurper
- utensil
- uterine
- utile
- utilisation
- utilise
- utility

== V ==
- vacant
- vacation
- vacuole
- vagabond
- vagrant
- vague
- vail
- vain
- vainglorious
- vainglory
- vair
- valance
- vale
- valerian
- valet
- valiance
- valiant
- valid
- validation
- validity
- valise
- valley
- valour
- valuation
- value
- vampire
- vanguard
- vanish
- vanity
- vanquish
- vantage
- vaporisation
- vaporous
- vapour
- variable
- variance
- variant
- variation
- variety
- various
- varlet
- varnish
- varvel
- vary
- vase
- vassal
- vassalage
- vast, Middle Fr. vaste
- vaudeville
- vault
- vaunt
- veal, Anglo-Fr. vel, from Old Fr. veel, compare Mod. Fr. veau
- vedette
- veer
- vegetable
- vegetation
- vegetative
- vehemence
- vehement
- vehicle
- veil
- vein
- velcro, from velours, velvet, and crochet, hook
- vellum
- velocipede
- velocity
- velour
- velvet
- venal
- venality
- vend
- vendor
- venerable
- veneration
- venge
- vengeance
- venial
- venison
- venom
- venomous
- vent
- ventilation
- ventral
- ventre à terre
- venue
- veracity
- verb
- verbal
- verbalise
- verbiage
- verbosity
- verdant
- verdict
- verdigris
- verdure
- verge
- verger
- verification
- verify
- verisimilitude
- veritable
- verity
- vermeil
- vermilion
- vermin
- vermouth
- vernier
- verse
- versicle
- versify
- version
- vers libre
- vert
- vertical
- vertiginous
- vervain
- verve
- vervet
- very, Old Fr. verai, compare Mod. Fr. vrai
- vesicle
- vesper
- vessel, Old Fr. vessel, compare Mod. Fr. vaisseau
- vest
- vestibule
- vestige
- vestment
- vestry
- vesture
- vetch
- veteran
- vex
- vexation
- viable
- viand
- vibrant
- vibration
- vicar
- vice
- viceroy
- vichyssoise
- vicious
- vicissitude
- victim
- victimology
- victory
- victual
- vie, Old Fr. envier
- view, Old Fr. veue, compare Mod. Fr. vue
- vigil
- vigilance
- vigneron
- vignette
- vigorous
- vigour
- vile
- village, Old Fr. village
- villain, Old Fr. villain
- villainous
- villainy
- villein
- vinaigrette
- vindicative
- vine
- vinegar
- vintage
- vintner
- viol, Middle Fr. viole
- violation
- violence, Old Fr. violence
- violet
- violon d’Ingres
- viper
- virgin, Old Fr. virgine
- virginal
- virginity
- virgule
- virile
- virility
- virion
- virology
- virtue
- virulence
- visa
- visage
- visceral
- viscosity
- viscount
- viscous
- vise
- visibility
- visible
- vision
- visionary
- visit
- visitant
- visitation
- visitor
- visor
- visualisation
- visualise
- vital
- vitalise
- vitality
- vitreous
- vitrify
- vitrine
- vitriol
- vitriolic
- vivify
- vocabulary
- vocal
- vocative
- vogue
- voice
- void
- voilà
- voile
- voir dire
- volant
- volatile
- volcanic
- volition
- volley
- voltigeur
- voluble
- volume, Old Fr. volume
- voluntary
- volunteer
- voluptuous
- volute
- voodoo
- voracity
- vote
- votive
- vouch
- voucher
- vow
- vowel
- voyage, Old Fr. veiage, compare Mod. Fr. voyage
- voyeur
- vue
- vulture

== W ==
Old French had a "gw" sound, which mainly occurred in borrowings from old Germanic languages such as Frankish and Burgundian. In Parisian and other Langue d'oïl dialects, the "w" was elided, leaving "g". Conversely, in northern dialects such as Picard and Norman, the "g" was elided, leaving "w".

After the Norman Conquest, it was the Norman variety of French that took root in England. This has led to many borrowings from French starting with "w" rather than "g" or "gu". However, in several cases, the central French version has subsequently been borrowed as well, leading to doublets such as "warden" and "guardian", "warrranty" and "guaranty", "wage" and "gauge", "wile" and "guile"; for more details see below.

- wafer (Cf Old Fr. gaufre, gofre)
- wage (Cf Old Fr. gage)
- wager, (Cf Old Fr. gager).
- wait, Old N. Fr. waitier [to watch] (compare modern Fr. guetter), from Frankish *wahton
- waive, Anglo-Fr. weyver, from Old Fr. weyver, guever, probably from a Scandinavian source
- wallet
- wallop
- Walter, Old N. Fr. Waltier (Old Fr. Gautier), of Germanic origin
- war, Old N. Fr. werre, (compare Fr. guerre), from Frankish *werra
- warble, Old N. Fr. werbler, from Frankish *werbilon
- warden, Old N. Fr. wardein, (compare Fr. gardien), from Frankish *warding-
- warder, Anglo-Fr. wardere, from Old N. Fr. warder, (compare Fr. garder [to guard])
- wardrobe, Old N. Fr. warderobe (Old Fr. garderobe)
- warrant, Old N. Fr. warant (Old Fr. guarant), from Frankish *warand
- warranty, Anglo-Fr. and Old N. Fr. warantie (Old Fr. guarantie)
- warren, Anglo-Fr. and Old N. Fr. warenne (Old Fr. garenna), possibly from Gaulish *varenna
- warrior, Old N. Fr. werreieor (Old Fr. guerreor)
- waste (Old Northern Fr. wast, Cf Modern French gâter "to spoil, waste")
- wicket, Old N. Fr. wiket (compare Fr. guichet), from a Germanic source
- wile, Old N. Fr. wile (Old Fr. guile)
- wince, Old N. Fr. wenchier (Old Fr. guenchir), from Frankish *wenkjan
- wyvern

== Y ==
- yaourt
- yperite

== Z ==
- zany Fr. zani, from Italian Zanni ["Johnny"]
- zebu Fr. zébu, from Tibetan
- zenith Old Fr. cenith (compare modern Fr. zénith), from Arabic
- zest Fr. zeste
- zigzag Fr. zigzag
- zouave
- zydeco

== See also ==
- French phrases used by English speakers
- Law French
- Glossary of fencing, (predominantly from French).
- Glossary of ballet (predominantly from French)
- Lists of English loanwords by country or language of origin
- List of English words of Gaulish origin
- List of English words of Latin origin
- List of English Latinates of Germanic origin
- List of English words of Frankish origin
- Latin influence in English
- List of French words of Germanic origin
- List of French words of Gaulish origin
- List of French words of Arabic origin
