= List of English words of French origin (J–R) =

The pervasiveness of words of French origin that have been borrowed into English is comparable to that of borrowings from Latin.

== J ==
- jabot
- jacinth
- jack, Old Fr. jaque or jacque, a garment, from Jacques, general nickname for peasants who used to wear this garment (see jacket)
- jacket, Old Fr. jaquette, diminutive form of jaque
- jade
- jail
- jalousie
- jamb
- jambalaya
- jangle
- janizary
- jape
- jar
- jardinière
- jargon
- jasmine
- jasper
- jaundice
- jaunt
- jaunty
- javelin
- jaw
- jay, Old Fr. gai, compare Mod. Fr. geai
- je ne sais quoi
- jealous
- jealousy
- jeans
- jelly (from gelée)
- jennet
- jeopardy
- jeremiad
- jersey
- jest
- jet
- jete
- jetsam
- jettison
- jetty
- jewel, Old Fr. jouel, compare Mod. Fr. joyau
- jeweller
- jewelry
- jocund
- joie de vivre
- join, from joindre
- joinder
- joiner
- joint
- jointure
- joist
- jollity
- jolly
- jongleur
- jonquil
- jouissance
- journal
- journey (Old Fr. journée)
- joust
- jovial
- joviality
- joy
- joyous
- jubilation
- jubilee
- judge, from juge
- judgement
- judgment
- judicious
- juggle, from jongler
- juggler
- juice
- julep
- julienne
- jupe
- juridic
- jury
- just, from Old French juste
- justice, from Old French, compare modern Fr. justice
- justiciable
- justifiable
- justification
- justify
- juxtapose
- juxtaposition

== K ==
- kaolin, Fr. kaolin, from Chinese Gao ling
- kennel
- kepi, Fr. képi, from Swiss Germ. käppi
- kerchief
- kermess or kirmess (Fr. 'kermesse)
- kestrel
- khedive
- kiosk, Fr. kiosque, from Turkish koshk, from Persian kushk
- kir

== L ==
- label
- laborious
- labour or labor, Old Fr. labour, compare Mod. Fr. labeur
- lace
- lackey, Middle Fr. laquais
- lacquer
- lacrosse
- lactose
- lagoon, Fr. lagune, from Italian laguna, from Latin lacuna
- laic
- laity
- lake
- lamé
- lamentable
- lampoon
- lamprey
- lance
- lancer
- lancet
- language (Old Fr. langage)
- languish
- languor
- languorous
- lantern
- lanyard
- lapidary
- lapse
- larceny
- lard
- large
- largess
- las
- lash
- lassitude
- lateen
- latent
- latitude
- latrine
- lattice
- laud
- launch
- launder
- laundry
- laurel
- lavage
- lavalier
- lavender
- laver (Fr. laveoir)
- lavish
- lawn
- laxative
- laxity
- lay (adj. and n.)
- layette
- league
- lease
- leash
- leaven
- lecher
- lecherous
- lechery
- lectern
- lees
- legacy
- legend
- legerdemain
- legion
- legionnaire
- legume
- leguminous
- leisure, Old Fr. leisir, compare modern Fr. loisir
- lemon
- lemonade
- lenity
- lenient
- lentil
- leotard
- lesion
- lessee
- lesson
- lessor
- letter
- lettuce
- levee
- level
- lever
- levy
- lexicographer
- liable
- liaise
- liaison
- lias
- libel, Old Fr. libelle
- liberal
- liberality
- liberation
- libertine
- liberty, Old Fr . liberté
- library
- libre
- license
- licorice
- liege
- lien
- lieu
- lieutenant
- ligature
- lignite
- lilac
- limbic
- limit
- limousine
- limpid
- line
- lineage
- lineal
- lineament
- lingerie
- linnet
- lintel
- lion
- liquefaction
- liquefy
- liqueur
- liquid
- liquor, Old Fr. licour
- liquorice
- list
- liter
- literal
- literary
- literature, Old Fr. litterature
- litigant
- litigious, Old Fr. litigieux
- litotes
- litre
- litter
- litterateur
- liturgy
- livery
- livid
- lizard
- loach, Old Fr. loche
- local
- locale
- localisation
- localise
- locality
- locket
- locomotive
- locust
- lodge
- lodgement
- loin
- longitude
- lorgnette
- loris
- lotion
- louche
- Louis
- lounge
- loupe
- louver
- loyal
- loyalty
- lozenge, Old Fr. losenge, compare modern Fr. losange
- ludic
- luff
- luge
- lumen
- luminaire
- luminary, Middle Fr. luminarie
- lunar
- lunatic
- lune
- lunette
- lunge
- lupin, Old Fr. lupin
- lure
- lush
- lustre or luster
- lute
- luthier
- luxe
- luxurious
- luxury
- lyre

== M ==
- macabre
- macaque
- macaroon
- mace
- macédoine
- macer
- mache
- machine
- mackerel
- mackle
- macle
- macramé
- macule
- madam (Old Fr. ma dame)
- madame
- madeleine
- mademoiselle
- maderization
- madrilene
- magazine
- magistral
- magnanimity
- magnificence
- magnificent
- magnify
- magnolia
- maigre
- mail, [post, letters] Old Fr. male, [metal ring armour] Old Fr. maille
- maillot
- maim
- maintain (Old Fr. maintenir)
- maintenance
- maisonette, Fr. maisonnette
- majesty (Fr. majesté)
- major (n.)
- majority (Fr. majorité)
- majuscule
- malachite
- maladroit
- malady
- malaise
- malapert
- malapropos
- malcontent
- mal de mer
- mal du siècle
- male, Old Fr. masle, compare Mod. Fr. mâle
- malediction
- malevolence
- malevolent
- malfeasance
- malic
- malice
- malicious
- malign
- malignity
- malinger (Fr. malingre)
- malison
- mallard
- mallet
- malversation
- mammary
- manacle
- manage
- mandolin
- maneuver or manoeuvre, Fr. manœuvre
- manganese
- mange
- manger
- mangetout
- mangle
- mangonel
- manicure
- manipulation
- mannequin
- manner
- manometer
- manor
- manque
- mansard
- mansion
- mantle, Old Fr. mantel, compare mod. Fr. manteau
- mantua, Fr. manteuil
- manual (n.)
- manufacture
- manure
- map
- maquette
- maquis
- maraud
- marble
- march
- mardi gras
- margarine
- marinade
- marinate
- marine, Middle Fr. marin
- mariner
- marionette, Fr. marionette
- marital
- maritime
- marjoram
- market
- marl
- marmalade, Middle Fr. marmelade, from Port. marmelada
- marmoset
- marmot
- maroon
- marque
- marquee
- marquess
- marquetry
- marquis
- marriage, Old Fr. mariage
- marry, Old Fr. marier
- marshal, Old Fr. mareschal, compare modern Fr. maréchal
- martel de fer
- marten, Old Fr. martrine, compare modern Fr. martre
- martin
- martinet
- martingale
- marvel, Old Fr. merveille
- marvelous, Old Fr. merveillos, compare mod. Fr. merveilleux
- mascle
- mascot
- masculine
- masculinity
- mask, Middle Fr. masque
- mason, Old Fr. masson, compare mod. Fr. maçon
- masonry, Fr. maçonnerie
- masque
- masquerade, Fr. mascarade, from Italian mascarata
- mass, Old Fr. masse
- massacre, Middle Fr. massacre
- massage
- masseur
- masseuse
- massicot
- massif
- massive
- master, Old Fr. maistre
- mastery, Old Fr. maistrie
- mastiff
- match [stick for striking fire], Old Fr. meiche, compare mod. Fr. mèche
- matelot
- matelote
- materiel
- maternal
- maternity
- mathematician
- mathematics
- matinal
- matinee
- matins
- matricide
- matrix, Old Fr. matrice
- matron
- matte
- matter, Anglo-Fr. matere, compare mod. Fr. matière
- mattress, Old Fr. materas, compare modern Fr. matelas
- maturation
- maudlin
- maul
- mauve
- mavis
- maxim
- mayday, Fr. m'aider, shortening of venez m'aider
- mayhem, Anglo-Fr. maihem, from Old Fr. mahaigne
- mayonnaise
- mayor, Old Fr. maire
- mayoralty
- meagre
- mean [middle, intermediate], Old Fr. meien, compare mod. Fr. moyen
- measurable
- measure
- medal, Middle Fr. médaille
- medallion
- meddle, Old North. Fr. medler (Old Fr. mesler, compare mod. Fr. mêler)
- median
- mediant
- medical
- medicament
- medication
- medicine
- mediocre, Fr. médiocre
- mediocrity
- meditation
- meditative
- medlar
- medley, Old Fr. medlee
- melange
- melee or mêlée
- melon
- member
- memoir
- memorable
- memory, Anglo-Fr. memorie, compare mod. Fr. mémoire
- menace
- menage
- ménage à trois
- menagerie
- mend, Old Fr. amender
- mendacious, Middle Fr. mendacieux
- mendicity
- menhir, Fr. menhir, from Breton men hir
- menial
- menstruous
- mental
- mentality
- mention
- menu
- mercantile
- mercer
- merchandise
- merchant
- mercy, Old Fr. mercit or merci
- mere (adj.), Old Fr. mier
- merengue
- meridian
- meridional
- meringue
- merit
- merle
- merlin, Anglo-Fr. merilun, from Old Fr. esmerillon
- merlon
- mesalliance
- mesclun
- mesne
- mess, Old Fr. mes
- message
- messenger
- messuage
- meticulous
- metier
- mew (n.) [cage], Old Fr. mue
- mezzanine, Fr. mezzanine, from Italian mezzanino
- migrant
- migration
- milieu
- milfoil
- militant
- militarisation
- military
- millet
- milliard
- milligram
- millilitre
- millimetre
- million
- millionaire, Fr. millionnaire
- minaret, Fr. minaret, from Turkish minare, from Arabic manarah
- minatory
- mince, Old Fr. mincier
- mine (n.), Old Fr. mine
- miner
- miniature
- minion
- minister, Old Fr. ministre
- ministerial
- minority
- minstrel
- mint
- minuet
- minuscule
- minute
- mirabelle
- miracle
- miraculous
- mirage
- mirepoix
- mirliton
- mirror, Old Fr. mireor, compare mod. Fr. miroir
- misadventure, Old Fr. mesaventure
- miscellany
- mischance
- mischief
- mischievous
- miscreant, Old Fr. mescreant, compare mod. Fr. mécréant
- mise en scène
- miserable, Old Fr. misérable
- misery, Old Fr. miserie, compare mod. Fr. misère
- misfeasance
- misnomer
- misprision
- misprize
- missal
- missile
- mistral
- mistress
- mitigation
- mitre
- mitten, Old Fr. mitaine
- mix, Anglo-Fr. mixte, compare mod. Fr. mixte
- mixture
- mizzen, Middle Fr. misaine
- moat
- mobile
- mobilisation
- mobilise or mobilize
- mobility
- mock
- mockery
- modal
- modality
- mode
- model
- moderation
- modern
- modernisation
- modest
- modesty
- modifiable
- modification
- modify
- modulation
- module
- mohair, Middle Fr. mocayart, from Arabic mukhayyar
- moiety
- moil
- moire
- moist, Old Fr. moiste, compare mod. Fr. moîte
- moisture
- mold
- mole
- molecule
- molest
- molestation
- mollification
- mollify
- mollusc
- moment, Old Fr. moment
- monarchy, Old Fr. monarchie
- monastery
- monetary
- money, Old Fr. moneie, compare mod. Fr. monnaie
- monition
- monsieur
- monster, Old Fr. monstre
- monstrous
- montage
- mooch
- moraine
- moral
- morale
- moralise
- morality
- mordant
- morel
- morganatic
- morgue
- moribund
- morsel
- mort
- mortal
- mortality
- mortar
- mortgage
- mortise
- mortification
- mortify
- mortise
- mortmain
- mortuary
- mosque, Middle Fr. mosquée
- mot juste
- motet
- motif
- motion
- motivation
- motive
- motley
- moue
- mount, Old Fr. mont
- mountain, Old Fr. montaigne, compare mod. Fr. montagne
- mountainous, Fr. montagneux
- mousse
- moustache or mustache, compare moustache
- mouton enragé
- movable
- move, Old Fr. moveir, compare mod. Fr. mouvoir
- movement
- mucilage
- muck
- muffle, Old Fr. moufle
- mulct
- mule [footwear]
- mullein
- mullet
- mullion
- multiple
- multiplication
- multiply
- multitude
- mummification
- mummify
- mummy
- mundane
- municipal
- municipality
- munificence
- munition
- mural
- murmur
- murrain
- muscat
- muscatel
- muscle
- musculature
- muse
- mushroom
- music
- musical
- musicality
- musician
- musk
- musket, Middle Fr. mousquet
- musketeer, Middle Fr. mousquetaire
- muslin
- mustard, Old Fr. moustarde, compare modern Fr. moutarde
- muster, Old Fr. mostrer, compare modern Fr. montrer
- mute
- mutineer
- mutiny
- mutton
- mutual
- muzzle

== N ==
- nacarat
- nacelle
- nacre
- naiant
- naïve
- naivete
- naivety
- nanometre
- nanosecond
- nanotechnology
- nard
- narghile
- narration
- narrative
- nasal
- natality
- nation, Old Fr. nacion, from Latin natio(n-), compare mod. Fr. nation
- national
- nationalisation
- nationalise
- native
- nativity
- natron
- natural, Old Fr. naturel
- naturalisation
- naturalise
- nature, Old Fr. nature
- naval, Old Fr. naval
- navarin
- navigable
- navigation
- navy, Old Fr. navie
- neat, Anglo-Fr. neit, from Old Fr. net, compare mod. Fr. net
- nebulous
- nebuly
- nécessaire
- necessary
- necessity
- née or nee, feminine past participle of naître, 'to be born'
- negation
- negative
- negatory
- negligee
- negligence
- negligent
- negligible
- negotiation
- negritude
- nervure
- neutral
- neutralisation
- neutralise
- neutrality
- neve
- newel
- nice (Old Fr. nice)
- nicety
- niche
- nicotine
- niece
- nobility
- noble
- noblesse oblige
- nocturnal
- nocturne
- noise (Old Fr. noise)
- nom de guerre
- nom de plume
- nominative
- nonage
- nonchalance
- nonchalant
- nonpareil
- noose
- norm
- normative
- notable
- notary
- note
- notice
- notification
- notify
- notoriety
- nougat
- noun
- nourish
- nourishment
- nouveau riche
- nouveau roman
- nouveau
- nouvelle cuisine
- nouvelle vague
- novel
- novelty
- novice (Old Fr. novice)
- novitiate
- nuance
- nubile
- nuisance
- null
- nullity (Fr. nullité)
- number (Old Fr. nombre)
- numeral
- numeric
- nurse
- nursery
- nurture
- nutmeg
- nutrition (Fr. nutrition)
- nutritive

== O ==
- obedient, Old Fr. obedient
- obeisance, Old Fr. obeissance, compare Mod. Fr. obéissance
- obesity
- obey
- objection
- oblation
- obligation
- oblige, Old Fr. obligier, compare Mod. Fr. obliger
- oblique
- obliquity
- obscene
- obscure
- obscurity
- observance
- observant
- observatory
- observe
- obstacle
- obtain
- obtuse
- occasion
- occident
- occidental
- occipital
- occupation, Old Fr. occupacion, compare Mod. Fr. occupation
- occupy
- occur
- occurrence
- ocelot, Fr. ocelot, from Nahuatl ocelotl
- ochre
- octogenarian
- odalisque
- ode
- odious, Anglo-Fr. odious, from Old Fr. odieus, compare Mod. Fr. odieux
- odometer, Fr. odomètre
- odour or odor, Anglo-Fr. odour, from Old Fr. odor, compare Mod. Fr. odeur
- oeillade
- oeuvre
- offend
- offense, Old Fr. offense
- offensive
- offer
- office
- officer, Old Fr. officier
- official
- officinal
- ogive, Fr. ogive
- ogre
- oil, Old Fr. oile, compare Mod. Fr. huile
- ointment, Old Fr. oignement
- oleaginous
- olive
- omelette or omelet, Fr. omelette
- omission
- omnibus
- omnipotent
- onerous
- onion
- ooh la la
- opacity
- opal
- opaque
- operation
- opine
- opinion, Old Fr. opinion
- opportune
- opportunity
- oppose, Old Fr. opposer
- opposite
- opposition, Old Fr. oposicion, compare Mod. Fr. opposition
- oppress, Old Fr. oppresser
- oppression
- opprobrious
- opt
- optative, Fr. optatif
- option
- opulence
- oracle, Old Fr. oracle
- oracular
- orange, Old Fr. orenge, compare Mod. Fr. orange
- orator
- orb
- ordain, Old Fr. ordener, compare Mod. Fr. ordonner
- order, Old Fr. ordre
- ordinance
- ordinary
- ordination
- ordure
- organdy
- orient
- orientate
- orientation
- orifice
- oriflamme
- origin
- original
- originality
- orimulsion
- oriole, Fr. oriol, from Old Provençal auriol
- orison
- ormolu
- ornament
- orpine
- oscillation
- osier
- osprey
- ostensible
- ostentation
- oubliette
- ounce
- oust
- ouster
- outrage
- outrageous
- outré
- overt
- overture
- ovule
- oyer and terminer
- oyez

== P ==
- pace, Old Fr. pas
- pacific
- pacification
- pacify
- packet
- pact
- page
- pagination
- pail
- paillard
- pain
- paint
- painter
- pair
- palace, Old Fr. palais
- paladin
- palate
- palatial
- palatine
- palaver
- pale (adj.)
- palestra
- palette
- palfrey
- palisade
- pallet
- palliative
- pallor
- palm, Old Fr. palme
- palmer
- palp
- palpable
- palpitant
- palpitation
- panache
- panda
- pane
- panel
- panne
- pannier
- pansy, Fr. pensée
- pant, Old Fr. pantaisier
- pantaloons, Fr. pantalon
- pantry
- papa
- papal
- paper
- papillon
- paramount, Anglo-Fr. paramont, from Old Fr. par amont
- paramour
- parapet
- parasol, Fr. parasol, from Italian parasole
- parboil
- parcel
- parchment
- pardon
- pare
- parent
- parentage
- parental
- parenthesis
- par excellence
- parfait
- parish
- parity
- park
- parlance
- parley
- parliament
- parlour
- parquet
- parricide
- parrot
- parry
- parse
- parsley
- parsnip
- parson
- part (Old Fr. part)
- parterre
- partial (Old Fr. parcial, compare modern Fr. partiel or partial, the latter being a synonym of biased)
- partiality
- participant
- participation
- participle
- particular
- particularity
- partisan
- partition
- partner
- party
- parvenu
- pas
- pass (Old Fr. passer)
- passable
- passage
- passant
- passé
- passenger
- passion
- passive
- passport
- paste
- pastel
- pastern
- pasteurisation
- pasteurise
- pastiche
- pastille
- pastis
- pastor
- pastoral
- pastry
- pasturage
- pasture
- pasty
- patch
- patchouli
- pâté
- patent
- paternal
- paternity
- patience (Old Fr. pacience)
- patient
- patina
- patisserie
- patois
- patrician
- patrol
- patron
- patronage
- patten
- pattern
- paucity
- paunch
- pause (Old Fr. pause)
- pave
- pavement
- pavilion
- paw
- pawn (Old Fr. pan, pant)
- pay
- payment
- paynim
- peace (Old Fr. pais)
- peaceable
- peach
- pearl
- peasant
- peasantry
- pecan
- pedal
- pederast
- pedestal
- pedicure
- pedigree
- peel
- peer
- peignoir
- pejorative
- pelage
- pelf
- pelisse
- pellet
- peloton
- pelt (Old Fr. pelete)
- pen (Old Fr. penne)
- penal
- penalty
- penance
- penchant
- pencil
- pendant
- pendentive
- penitence
- penitent
- pennant
- pennon
- pension
- pensioner
- pensive
- penthouse, Anglo-Fr. pentiz, from Old Fr. apentis
- penury
- people (Old Fr. peupel)
- peradventure, Old Fr. par aventure, refashioned as though from Latin
- percale
- perceive
- perch (Old Fr. perche)
- perchance, Old Fr. par cheance
- percussion
- perdition
- père
- peregrination
- peregrine
- peremptory
- perfect
- perfection
- perfidy
- perforce, Old Fr. par force
- perform
- perfume, from Middle French, parfum
- perfusion
- perianth
- peridot
- peril
- perilous
- perish
- perjure
- perjury
- permanent
- permissible
- permission
- permissive
- permit
- permutation
- pernicious
- perpendicular
- perpetual
- perpetuity
- perron
- perry
- perse
- persecute
- persecution
- perseverance
- persevere
- persist
- persistence
- person (Old Fr. persone)
- personage
- personal
- personality
- personify
- personnel
- perspective
- perspicacity
- perspiration
- persuasion
- persuasive
- pertain
- pertinacity
- pertinence
- pertinent
- perturb
- perturbation
- peruke
- perverse
- perversity
- pervert
- pest
- pestilence
- pestle
- petard
- petiole
- petit
- petite
- petite bourgeoisie
- petit four
- petition
- petty (Old Fr. petit)
- petulance
- petulant, compare pétulant
- petunia
- pew
- pickaxe
- picket
- picnic
- piece (Old Fr. piece)
- piece de resistance
- pierce
- piety (Old Fr. piete)
- pigeon
- pike
- pilaster
- pilfer
- pilgrim
- pillage
- pillar
- pillory
- pilot
- pimp
- pimpernel
- pinch
- pineal
- pinion
- pinnace
- pinnacle
- pinot
- pint
- piolet
- pioneer
- pipette
- pippin
- piquant
- pique
- piqué
- piquet
- pirogue
- pirouette
- piss, Old Fr. pissier, compare Mod. Fr. pisser
- piste
- pistil
- pistol
- pistole
- piston
- pitcher
- piteous
- pitiable
- piton
- pittance
- pity
- pivot
- placard
- place
- placid
- plague
- plaice
- plain (Old Fr. plain)
- plaint
- plaintiff
- plaintive
- plait
- plan
- planchet
- plane
- plank
- plant
- plantain
- plantation
- plantigrade
- plaque
- platoon (Fr. peloton)
- plea (Old Fr. plait)
- plead
- pleasant (Old Fr. plaisant)
- pleasantry (Old Fr. plaisanterie)
- please, Old Fr. plaise, subj. of plaire
- pleasure (Old Fr. plesir, modern French plaisir)
- pleat
- plebiscite (Fr. plébiscite)
- pledge (Old Fr. plege)
- plenitude
- plenteous
- plenty
- pliable
- pliant
- plié
- plover
- plumage
- plumb
- plumber (Old Fr. plommier)
- plume
- plummet
- plunge
- plural (Old Fr. pluriel)
- plurality
- plus ça change
- plush
- pluvial
- ply
- poach
- pocket
- poignant
- point
- poise
- poison
- poke (n.)
- polish
- politesse
- polonaise
- poltroon
- pomade
- pome
- pomegranate
- pommel
- pomp
- pompom
- pompadour
- pompier
- pompous
- ponder
- poniard
- pontiff
- pontoon
- pony
- pool [game]
- poontang
- poop
- poor, Old Fr. poure, compare Mod. Fr. pauvre
- popinjay
- poplar
- poplin
- populace (Fr. populace)
- porcelain
- porch
- porcine
- porcupine
- pork
- porous
- porpoise
- porridge
- port (Old Fr. port)
- portable
- portage
- portcullis
- porte cochère
- portent
- porter
- portière
- portion
- portmanteau
- portrait
- portraiture
- portray
- pose, compare poser
- poseur
- position (Old Fr. position)
- positive (Old Fr. positif)
- possess (Old Fr. possesser, modern Fr. posséder)
- possessive
- possibility
- possible (Fr. possible)
- post, compare poste
- postal
- posterity
- postern
- postilion, Fr. postillon
- postulant
- posture
- pot
- potable
- potation
- potion
- potpourri
- pottage
- potter
- pottery
- pouch
- pouffe
- poult
- poulterer
- poultry
- pounce
- poutine, Quebec Fr.
- poverty, Old Fr. poverte, compare Mod. Fr. pauvreté
- powder, Old Fr. poudre, compare Mod. Fr. poudre
- power, Old Fr. poeir, compare Mod. Fr. pouvoir
- prairie
- praise
- praline
- pray
- prayer
- preach
- preacher
- preamble
- prebend
- precaution
- precede
- precedence
- precedent
- precious
- precipice
- precipitation
- precipitous
- precis
- precise
- precision
- precocity
- predestination
- predestine
- predilection
- predisposition
- predominance
- predominant
- preen
- preface
- prefect
- prefecture
- prefer
- preferable
- preference
- prefix
- pregnancy
- pregnant
- prehensile
- prehistoric
- prehistory
- prejudge
- prejudice
- prelate
- preliminary
- prelude
- premature
- premier
- premiere (Fr. première)
- premise
- premiss
- premolar
- premonition
- prenatal
- preoccupation
- preoccupy
- preparation
- prepare
- prepuce
- prerogative
- presage
- prescription
- presence
- present
- presentable
- presentation
- presentiment
- preservation
- preservative
- preserve
- preside
- presidence
- president
- press
- pressure
- prestidigitation
- prestige
- presume
- presumption
- presumptuous
- presuppose
- presupposition
- pretend
- pretense
- pretentious
- preterite
- prevail
- prevalence
- prevalent
- prevarication
- prevision
- prevue
- prey
- price (Old Fr. pris)
- priest
- prim
- primacy
- primate
- primitive
- primogeniture
- primrose
- prince (Old Fr. prince)
- princess
- princical
- principality (Old Fr. principalité)
- principle
- print
- priority
- priory
- prise
- prison (Old Fr. prisoun)
- prisoner
- pristine
- privation
- privilege
- privity
- privy
- prix fixe
- prize
- probability
- probable
- probation
- probity
- procedure
- proceed
- process
- procession
- proclaim
- proclamation
- procreation
- procurable
- procurator
- procure
- procurement
- procurer
- prodigal
- prodigality
- prodigious
- production
- profanation
- profane
- profer
- profess
- profession
- proffer
- profile
- profit
- profitable
- profiteroles
- profound
- profundity
- profusion
- progenitor
- progeny
- prognostication
- progress
- progression
- prohibition
- projection
- proletariat
- proliferation
- prolific
- prolix
- prolong
- prolongation
- promenade
- prominence
- prominent
- promiscuity
- promise
- promotion
- prompt
- promptitude
- promulgation
- pronation
- prone
- pronoun (Fr. pronom)
- pronounce
- pronouncement
- pronunciation
- proof (Old Fr. proeve)
- propagation
- propane
- proper (Old Fr. propre)
- property
- propinquity
- propitious
- proport
- proportion (Old Fr. proportion)
- propose, from proposer
- proposition (Old Fr. proposition)
- propriety
- prorogue
- prosaic
- prose (Old Fr. prose)
- prosecution
- prospective
- prospectus
- prosper
- prosperity
- prosperous
- protection (Old Fr. protection)
- protector
- protege
- protegee
- protest
- protestation
- protrusion
- protuberance
- proud (Old Fr. prud)
- prove
- provenance
- provender
- proverb
- providence
- province (Old Fr. province)
- provincial
- provision
- provisional
- provocation
- provoke
- provost
- prow
- prowess
- proximity
- proxy
- prude
- prudence
- prudent
- prudery
- prune
- puberty
- pubescent
- public
- publication
- publicity
- publish
- puce
- puerility
- pugnacity
- puissance
- puissant
- pulley
- pulse
- pulverisation
- pumice
- pump
- pumpkin
- punch
- puncheon
- punish (Old Fr. puniss-)
- punishment
- punitive
- puny
- pup
- pupil
- puppet
- puppy
- purchase
- pure (Old Fr. pur)
- puree
- purgative
- purge
- purification
- purify (Old Fr. purifier)
- purity
- purloin
- purport
- purpose (Old Fr. porpos)
- purse
- pursuant
- pursue
- pursuit
- purulent
- purvey
- purveyor
- purview
- push
- pusillanimity
- pustule
- putative
- putrefaction
- putrefy
- putridity
- putty (Modern Fr. potée)

== Q ==
- quadrangle
- quadrangular
- quadrille
- quadruped
- quail
- quaint
- quality
- quantity
- quarrel
- quarry
- quart
- quarter
- quartet
- quartier
- quartile
- quash
- quaternary
- quatrain
- quatrefoil
- quay
- queasy
- querulous
- quest
- question
- questionnaire
- queue
- qui vive
- quiche
- quiet
- quietude
- quilt
- quince
- quinsy
- quint
- quintain
- quintal
- quintessence
- quintuple
- quire
- quit
- quittance
- quiver
- quoit
- quote
- quotidian

== R ==
- rabat
- rabbit
- race
- racket
- raconteur
- racquet
- radiant
- radioactive
- raffle
- rage, Old Fr. raige
- ragout
- rail
- raillery
- raiment
- raisin
- rally
- ramification
- ramify
- ramp
- rampage
- rampant
- rampart
- rancour
- random
- range
- rank
- rankle
- ransom
- rapacity
- rape
- rapids
- rapier
- rapine
- rappel
- rapport
- rapporteur
- rapprochement
- rapture
- rare, Old Fr. rere
- rarefy
- rarity
- rascal
- rasp
- rastaquouère
- ratafia
- ratatouille
- ratchet
- rate
- ratification
- ratify
- ration
- rationalisation
- rationality
- raucous
- ravage
- rave
- raven
- ravenous
- ravine
- ravish
- ray
- rayon
- raze
- razor
- reaction
- reactionary
- reactive
- reaffirm
- reaffirmation
- real, Old Fr. reel
- realisable
- realisation
- realise
- reality
- realm
- ream (n.)
- rear
- reason, Old Fr. raison
- reasonable
- reassure
- rebarbative
- rebate
- rebec
- rebel
- rebellion
- rebound
- rebuff
- rebuke
- rebut
- recalcitrance
- recalcitrant
- recapitulation
- recede
- receipt
- receive, Old Fr. receivre, compare Modern Fr. recevoir
- receptacle
- reception
- receptor
- recharge
- recherche
- recipe
- recipient
- reciprocity
- recitation
- recite
- reclaim
- reclamation
- recluse
- recognizance
- recognize
- recoil
- recollection
- recommence
- recommencement
- recommend
- recommendation
- recompense
- reconciliation
- reconfigure
- reconnaissance
- reconnoitre, compare reconnaître
- record
- recordation
- recorder, Old Fr. recordeur
- recount
- recoup
- recourse
- recover
- recovery
- recreant
- recreation
- recrimination
- recruit
- rectangle
- rectification
- rectify
- rectitude
- rectory
- recuse
- redolent
- redouble
- redoubt
- redoubtable
- redound
- redress
- reduce
- reduction
- refer
- reflect
- reform
- refrain
- refresh
- refreshment
- refuge
- refugee
- refund
- refuse
- regain
- regale
- regard
- regenerative
- regent
- regime
- regiment
- region
- regional
- regret
- regroup
- regular
- rehabilitation
- rehearse
- reign
- reimburse
- rein
- rejection
- rejoice
- rejoin
- rejoinder
- relation
- relative
- relax
- relay
- release
- relic
- relief
- relieve
- religion
- religious
- relinquish
- reliquary
- relish
- rely
- remain, Old Fr. remaindre
- remainder
- remand
- remark
- remarkable
- remedy
- remember
- remembrance
- remise
- remission
- remnant
- remonstrance
- remorse
- remoulade
- remove
- renaissance
- render
- rendezvous
- rendition
- renounce
- renouncement
- renown
- rent
- rentier
- repair
- reparable
- repartee
- repartition
- repast
- repay
- repeal
- repeat
- repel
- repent
- repentance
- repentant
- repercussion
- repertoire
- replenish
- replenishment
- replete
- replevin
- replication
- reply
- report
- repose
- repoussé
- represent
- representative
- reprieve
- reprimand
- reprisal
- reprise
- reproach
- reprove
- reptile
- republic
- repugnance
- repulsive
- repute
- request
- require
- requisition
- rescue
- research
- resemblance
- resemble
- resent
- resentment
- reservation
- reserve
- reservoir
- reside
- residence
- residue
- resign
- resignation
- resile
- resin
- resist
- resistance
- resistant
- resonance
- resort
- resound
- resource
- respire
- respite
- respond
- response
- responsibility
- responsible
- responsive
- ressentiment
- rest
- restaurant
- restaurateur
- restitute
- restive
- restore
- restrain
- restraint
- restrictive
- résumé
- resurrection
- retail
- retain
- retard
- retardant
- retentive
- reticence
- reticule
- retinue
- retire
- retirement
- retouch
- retrace
- retreat
- retrench
- retrenchment
- retrieve
- retroactive
- return
- reunion
- revanche
- reveal
- reveille
- revel
- revelation
- revenant
- revenge
- revenue
- reverberant
- reverberation
- revere
- reverence
- reverend
- reverie
- reverse
- reverser
- reversion
- revert
- revetment
- review
- revile
- revise
- revision
- revisit
- revive
- revivify
- revocable
- revoke
- revolt
- revolution
- revue
- reward
- ribald
- ribaldry
- ribbon
- rice
- riches
- ricochet
- ridicule
- rifle
- rigor or rigour
- rigorous
- rink
- rinse
- riot
- riposte
- risk
- risqué
- river
- rivet
- rivulet
- roach
- roan
- roast
- rob
- robbery
- robe
- robin
- rock
- rocket (plant), Fr. roquette
- rococo
- rogue
- roil
- roister
- role
- roll, Old Fr. rolle
- romaine
- roman à clef
- romance
- romantic
- rondeau
- rondel
- rook (chesspiece)
- rosé
- rosette
- rosin
- rotisserie
- roué
- rouge
- roulette
- round
- roundel
- roundelay
- rouse
- rout, Old Fr. route
- route
- routine
- roux
- rowel
- royal, Old Fr. roial, compare Mod. Fr. royal
- royalty
- rubbish
- rubble
- rubric
- ruby
- ruche
- rude
- rudiment
- rue (plant)
- ruffian
- ruin
- ruinous
- rule
- rummage
- rumor or rumour
- rupture
- rural
- ruse
- rush, Old Fr. ruser
- russet
- rut

== See also ==
- French phrases used by English speakers
- Law French
- Glossary of fencing, (predominantly from French).
- Glossary of ballet (predominantly from French)
- Lists of English loanwords by country or language of origin
- List of English words of Gaulish origin
- List of English words of Latin origin
- List of English Latinates of Germanic origin
- List of English words of Frankish origin
- Latin influence in English
- List of French words of Germanic origin
- List of French words of Gaulish origin
- List of French words of Arabic origin
