= ...And Oceans =

Finnish metal band

- Origin: Helsinki, Finland
- Genres: Death metal, melodic death metal, symphonic black metal, experimental metal, industrial metal
- Years active: Festerday: 1989–1992; 2013–2020...and Oceans: 1995–2005, 2020–present Havoc Unit: 2005–2013
- Label: Century Media Season of Mist
- Members: Timo Kontio; Teemu Saari; Kauko Kuusisalo; Antti Simonen; Mathias Lillmåns; Pyry Hanski
- Past members: See: ...and Oceans membership

...And Oceans, previously Havoc Unit and Festerday, is a Finnish metal band. It was formed in 1989 as a death metal band but changed to symphonic black metal. It released its first album as ...and Oceans in 1998. In the following years, it pursued a less traditional, more industrial-oriented direction.

== History ==
The band was formed in 1989 as Festerday and played death metal. It renamed to ...and Oceans in 1995. The band's debut release was the symphonic black metal album Dynamic Gallery of Thoughts, released by Season of Mist. The Symmetry of I – The Circle of O followed in 1998. The band signed to Century Media, who issued the A.M. G.O.D.: Allotropic/Metamorphic Genesis of Dimorphism album, described by AllMusic as "definitely one of the band's finest". A European tour with Marduk, Vader, and Mortician raised the band's profile. Allmusic described the band's 2002 album Cypher as "Scandinavian cyber-metal", "sounding as if Skinny Puppy and Cannibal Corpse have spawned some kind of terrible, shrieking cyborg baby". Band members played in Rotten Sound, Deathbound, and 6 Billion Ways to Die.

=== Havoc Unit ===
After ten years as ...and Oceans and four full-length albums, the band changed its name to Havoc Unit in 2005. Its first album under the new name was h.IV+ (Hoarse Industrial Viremia), released in 2008. In 2013, the band reverted to Festerday.

=== Return as ...And Oceans ===
On January 14, 2020, Season of Mist announced the release of Cosmic World Mother, a new album from the band, now reformed as ...And Oceans.

In October 2022, the band announced their upcoming album, As in Gardens, So in Tombs, would be released on January 27, 2023.

== Members ==
- T.kunz (Timo Kontio) – guitar (1989–present), bass guitar (1992–1995, 1997–present)
- de Monde "7Even II" (Teemu Saari) – guitar (1989–2001, 2017–present)
- Kauko Kuusisalo – drums (2018–present)
- Antti Simonen – keyboards (2018–present)
- Mathias Lillmåns – vocals (2019–present)
- Pyry Hanski – bass guitar (2020–present)

=== Former members ===
==== ...And Oceans ====
- Martex "Cauldron, Grief, Mr. Plaster" (Jani Martikkala) – drums (1997–2001)
- Mr. Oos (Marcus Roos) – bass (1995–1997)
- Anti "Anzaar" – keyboards (1997–2005)
- Heinr.ich (Mika Aalto) – bass, keyboards (1999–2013, 2018–2019)
- Pete (Petri Seikkula) – guitar (2001–2005)
- Sa.myel (Sami Latva) – drums, bass, guitar (2002–2013)
- Jallu – bass
- Piia – keyboards, violin
- Jos.f (Kena Strömsholm) – vocals (1989–2019)

==== Festerday ====
- Teemu Kilponen – drums (1990–1992)
- Jakke Mäki – bass (1990–1992)
- Jari Honkaniemi – bass (1989–1990)
- Miikka Timonen – drums (1989–1990)
- Veijo Pulkkinen – drums (1989–1990)

Timeline

== Discography ==
=== As Festerday (1989–1992; 2013–2020) ===
- Festerday / Carnifex (split with Carnifex, 1991)
- Demo II (demo, 1991)
- Demo III (demo, 1992)
- Iihtallan (album, 2019)

=== As ...And Oceans (1995–2005; 2020–present) ===
==== Albums ====
- The Dynamic Gallery of Thoughts (1998)
- The Symmetry of I - The Circle of O (1999)
- A.M.G.O.D. (Allotropic/Metamorphic Genesis of Dimorphism) (2001)
- Cypher (2002)
- Cosmic World Mother (2020)
- As in Gardens, So in Tombs (2023)
- The Regeneration Itinerary (2025)

==== Other ====
- Wave (demo, 1995)
- Promo Tape (demo, 1996)
- Mare Liberum (demo, 1997)
- War Vol. I (split with Bloodthorn, 1998)
- ...and Oceans (box set, 2000)
- mOrphogenesis (EP) (2001)
- The Dynamic Gallery of Thoughts / The Symmetry of I – The Circle of O (compilation, 2003)

=== As Havoc Unit (2005–2013) ===
- Havoc Unit / And Then You Die (split with And Then You Die, 2007)
- Synæsthesia - The Requiem Reveries (2007)
- Havoc Unit / ...and Oceans (2007)
- h.IV+ (Hoarse Industrial Viremia) (2007)
