= Cipher (disambiguation) =

A cipher is a method of encryption or decryption.

Cipher may also refer to:

== Science and mathematics ==
- CIPHER (DOS command), an external filter command in some versions of MS-DOS 2.xx
- One of the names for the number 0 in English

== Entertainment and culture ==
- Cipher (manga), a manga series by Minako Narita
- Cipher (comics), a Marvel Comics X-Men character
- Cipher (newuniversal), a Marvel Comics character in the newuniversal imprint
- Bill Cipher, the main antagonist of Gravity Falls
- Cipher, the player character in Ace Combat Zero: The Belkan War
- Team Cipher, the villainous team from Pokémon Colosseum and its sequel Pokémon XD: Gale of Darkness
- Cipher, a criminal mastermind and cyber terrorist in The Fate of the Furious
- A codename for The Patriots in the video game series Metal Gear Solid
- A word used by the Five-Percent Nation to refer to zero, letter "O" or a circle
- A playable character class in the role-playing video game Pillars of Eternity

== Music ==
- Cipher (The Alpha Conspiracy album)
- Cipher (Joshua Abrams album)
- Cipher (band), a hardcore punk band
- Ciphers (album), a 1996 album by SETI
- Cipher, Japanese musician and guitarist of the rock band D'erlanger
- "Cipher", a 2011 song by Kevin MacLeod
- Cipher notation, a type of musical notation
- A note that continues to sound in a pipe organ when the organist does not intend for it to sound
- A freestyle rap session from a group of rappers

== People ==
- A stage name of Ichiro Takigawa, the guitarist of the Japanese rock band D'erlanger
- Cipha Sounds, the alias of Luis Diaz, an American radio and television personality

== Companies ==
- Cipher Data Products, a defunct computer storage company

== See also ==
- Cypher (disambiguation)
- Cyphers (disambiguation)
