= H.IV+ (Hoarse Industrial Viremia) =

h.IV+ (Hoarse Industrial Viremia)

Studio album by Havoc Unit
- Released: October 29, 2007
- Genre: Industrial black metal
- Length: 48:27
- Label: Vendlus Records

Havoc Unit chronology
SYNÆSTHESIA - The Requiem Reveries (2007)	h.IV+ (Hoarse Industrial Viremia) (2007)

Professional ratings
Review scores
Source	Rating
AllMusic	3/5 stars
Metal Storm	9.8/10

h.IV+ (Hoarse Industrial Viremia) is the fifth studio album by Finnish industrial experimental black metal band, Havoc Unit (including their albums with their former name, ...and Oceans). The industrial elements of this album, while not as evident as in their previous albums, are present.

The first song's Arabic title can be transliterated Mbyd (pesticide) Aldydan (worms), meaning vermicide.

== Track listing ==
No.	Title	Length
1.	"مبيد الدّيدان [Vermicide]"	5:15
2.	"I. esus [The Liturgy of Inhumanity]"	3:46
3.	"When Children Are No Longer Enough [C.oitus O.rgasm C.atholic K.ids]"	6:13
4.	"Generation Genocide [Humanitarian Vivisection]"	3:42
5.	"Viremia [Regime HIV+]"	5:56
6.	"Kyrie Eleison [Totalitarian Libertarianism]"	4:25
7.	"Nihil [Operation Blitzkrieg]"	2:14
8.	"Man vs. Flesh [Structured Suicide]"	3:42
9.	"Ignoratio Elenchi [Reversed Genesis]"	3:54
10.	"Kill All Nations [The Manual of Terrorism]"	5:32
11.	"Kristallnacht [From Revolution to Reconstruction]"	1:36
12.	"Klan Korps [Volkssturm & Erregung]"	3:27
13.	"Rape Scene Act I [The Fine Art of Quality Time]"	3:55

== Personnel ==
- sa.myel (Sami Latva) – drums, bass, guitars (All in Me, Deathbound, Ghost Guard, O, Rotten Sound)
- t.kunz – guitars, bass (O, Deathbound)
- jos.f – vocals (O, (SIC), Irene's Kunt, Extreme Disco Terror, Peacefrog)
- heinr.ich – keys (O, (SIC), Kinetik Control, The Sin:Decay, Kyprian's Circle, Black Dawn (Fin), The True Black Dawn)
