= Bloodthorn =

Norwegian black metal band

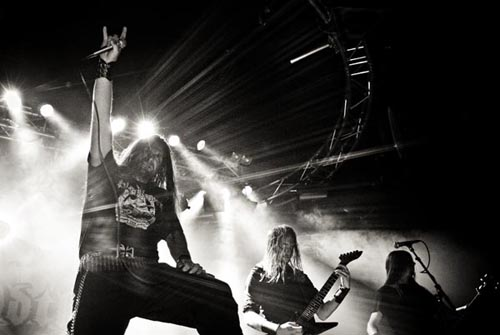
- Live at Hole in the Sky, Bergen Metal Fest 2007

Background information
- Origin: Trondheim, Norway
- Genres: Black metal; death metal
- Years active: 1992–2011
- Labels: Morningstar Records, Season of Mist
- Members: Krell - vocals; Ihizahg - guitar; Harald - bass; Jehmod - drums; Sverre - guitar

Bloodthorn was a Norwegian black metal band from Trondheim.

== History ==
Bloodthorn was founded in 1992. Their album Under The Reign Of Terror (2001) abandoned female vocals (by Christine Hjertaas) and keyboards (by Geir Mikael Reijners) of the first two albums and went back to their extreme metal roots. In 2006, Bloodthorn released their fourth album, Genocide.

Following the release of Genocide, Bloodthorn played at several festivals, including Inferno and Wacken Open Air 2006 as well as Hole in the Sky 2007, and toured Europe and Scandinavia with Carpathian Forest and Vader, respectively.

Bloodthorn disbanded in 2011

== Discography ==
- Natteskyggen (demo 1996)
- In the Shadow of Your Black Wings (CD 1997/LP 1998)
- WAR Vol. I (1998, split with ...and Oceans)
- Onwards Into Battle (CD 1999)
- Under the Reign of Terror (CD/LP 2001)
- Genocide (CD 2006/LP 2007)
