= A.M.G.O.D. (Allotropic/Metamorphic Genesis of Dimorphism) =

Studio album by ...and Oceans
- Released: February 20, 2001
- Genres: Post-black metal Industrial black metal
- Length: 48:27
- Label: Century Media
- Producer: Tommy Tägtgren

...and Oceans chronology
mOrphogenesis (2001)	A.M.G.O.D. (Allotropic/Metamorphic Genesis of Dimorphism) (2001)	Cypher (2002)

Professional ratings
Review scores
Source	Rating
AllMusic	4.5/5 stars
Metal Temple	8/10 stars

A.M.G.O.D. (Allotropic/Metamorphic Genesis of Dimorphism) is the third studio album by Finnish industrial black metal band ...and Oceans. This album incorporates more electronic/industrial elements than past albums, while retaining the band's black metal roots.

== Track listing ==
No.	Title	Length
1.	"Intelligence Is Sexy"	5:15
2.	"White Synthetic Noise"	5:30
3.	"Tears Have No Name"	6:13
4.	"Esprit de Corps"	3:35
5.	"Odious & Devious"	6:16
6.	"Of Devilish Tongues"	5:44
7.	"Postfuturistika"	5:41
8.	"TBA in a Silver Box"	4:18
9.	"New Model World"	5:55

== Personnel ==
- Killstar – vocals
- Tripster – guitar
- 7even II – guitar
- Atomica – bass
- Plasmaar – keyboards
- Martex – drums
