= War Vol. I =

Studio album by ...and Oceans and Bloodthorn
- Released: 1998
- Genre: Black metal

...and Oceans chronology
The Dynamic Gallery of Thoughts (1998)	War Vol. I (1998)	The Symmetry of I - The Circle of O (1999)

Bloodthorn chronology
In the Shadow of Your Black Wings (1997)	War Vol. 1 (1998)	Onwards Into Battle (1999)

War Vol. 1 is an album split between the Finnish symphonic black metal band ...and Oceans and the Norwegian death/black metal band Bloodthorn. The two bands recorded two completely new songs and covered each other's work alongside that of a third band, this time GGFH.

== Track listing ==
War Vol. 1 has 8 tracks.

1. ...Ja Kylmä Vesi Nuolee Oksaa (...And the Cold Water Licks the Branch)
2. 100 Meters Final (Accelerate)
3. Flesh (GGFH cover)
4. Breeding the Evil Inside (Bloodthorn cover)
5. Spite
6. The End Offensive (War III)
7. Dead Men Don't Rape (GGFH cover)
8. Kärsimyksien Vaaleat Kädet (The White Hands of Sufferings) (...And Oceans cover)
