= Cypher (...And Oceans album) =

Studio album by ...And Oceans
- Released: September 3, 2002
- Genre: Industrial metal
- Length: 47:07
- Label: Century Media

...And Oceans chronology
A.M.G.O.D. (Allotropic/Metamorphic Genesis of Dismorphism) (2001)	Cypher (2002)	SYNÆSTHESIA - The Requiem Reveries (2007)

Professional ratings
Review scores
Source	Rating
laut.de	5/5 stars

Cypher is the fourth album by industrial black metal band ...And Oceans, and the last to be released under this moniker before the band's name was changed into Havoc Unit. The original name of the album was set to be Insect Angels and Devil Worms, but was changed.

== Track listing ==
1. "Fragile: Pictures of Silence: Melting the Skies" — (2:46)
2. "Picturesque: Cataclysm Saviour: And the Little Things That Make Us Smile" — (3:25)
3. "Angelina: Chthonian Earth: Her Face Forms Worms" — (3:52)
4. "Halcyon: The Heavy Silence: In Silent Rain" — (3:46)
5. "Aphelion: Light Evanescence: Into Extinction" — (3:28)
6. "Opaque: The Morning I Woke Up Dead: Today Is the Day" — (3:08)
7. "Aphid: Devil Flower: Fruits of Lunacy" — (3:32)
8. "Voyage: Lost Between Horizons: Eaten by the Distance" — (4:17)
9. "Catharsis: End of Organisms: Absolute Purification of Sins" — (2:31)
10. "Silhouette: In White Rooms: Vacant Bodies" — (3:48)
11. "Comatose: The World Amnesia: Planet Dead" — (2:58)
12. "Debris: The Magenta Harvest: Liquid Flesh" — (4:19)
13. "Nail: An Odyssey in Flesh: Celebrate the New Skin" — (5:17)

== Personnel ==
- Kenny — vocals
- T — guitar
- Petri Siekkula — guitar
- Mika Aalto — bass
- Anti — keyboards
- Sami — drums
