= List of French words of Arabic origin =

Most words of Arabic origin came into French via another Romance language. Many of the words that entered Italian came via Sicilian, as Sicily was under Muslim rule for more than two centuries. A few words, most of them slang terms, came via the North African Arabic dialects of former French colonies. Medieval Latin also contributed some words.

Meanwhile, Muslim rule in Iberia continued for seven centuries in some areas. Hence there are many more (Castilian, Catalan and Portuguese) words that derive from Arabic; of these, some have in turn been borrowed by French.

== A ==
- abricot ("apricot") : from Catalan albercoc, derived from the Arabic al barqūq (أَلْبَرْقُوق) which is itself borrowed from Late Greek praikokkion derived from Latin præcoquum, meaning "(the) early fruit"
- adoble ("adobe") : from Spanish adobe, derived from the Arabic al-ṭūb (الطوب) meaning "(the) dried earth brick"
- albacore ("albacore") (zoo.) : from Latin American Spanish albacora, itself from Moroccan Arabic bakûra "young bonito (kind of fish)"
- alcade ("alcalde", "Spanish magistrate or judge"), from Spanish alcade "magistrate, judge", itself from Arabic al-qāḍi (القاض) "the judge; the cadi".
- alchimie ("alchemy"): from Medieval Latin alchimia, itself from Arabic al kīmíj̄a or al kîmiâ (الكيمياء), possibly from either Greek or Coptic source according to current hypotheses
- alcool ("alcohol"), double origin : scholarly Latin and Spanish alcohol, from Arabic kuḥúl (الكحول)
- alcôve ("alcove): from Spanish alcoba, itself from Arabic al qubba (القبة) "cupola"
- alambic ("still"): from Medieval Latin alambicus, itself from Arabic al−anbīq or al-inbīq (الإنبيق) meaning "(the) alcohol distillation still". The invention of the still is traced to Ptolemaic Egypt. As in many cases, the original Greek word ἄμβιξ (ambix), meaning "top of a still" had the definite article al- added onto it by Arabic speakers.
- alezan (horse: chestnut, sorrel) : from Spanish alazán, probably Arabic ﺃﺻﹿﻬﹷﺐ [’aṣhab]
- algèbre (algebra): from Medieval Latin algebra, itself from Arabic al-ǧabr or al-jabr الجبر meaning "amending" or "reunion", a root of the word Arabic word 'splint' jabirah جبيرة
- algorithme ("algorithm"): scholarly form of Old French augorisme, itself from Old Spanish alguarismo, from al-Ḫuwārizmī, nickname of mathematician al-Khwarizmi الخوارزمي
- alidade : from Medieval Latin alhidada, alidada "rule of the astrolabe", itself from Arabic al idāda
- almanach ("almanac") : from Medieval Latin almanach "calendar" from Spanish Arabic al manāḫ "calendar", المناخ, itself from Syriac l-manhaï "next year"
- amalgame ("mixture", "blend", "amalgam") : from Medieval Latin amalgama, from Arabic al-ḡamâa الملغم
- ambre ("amber") : from Medieval Latin ambar / ambra, itself from Arabic anbar عنبر
- amiral ("admiral") : from Arabic amīr al-'ālī "higher chief" or amīr-ar-rahl "fleet commander" أمير البحر
- aniline ("aniline") from German Anilin, scholarly derivation of anil "purple dye", itself from Portuguese anil borrowed from Arabic an‑nīl (النيلة (صبغة, ultimately from Sanskrit.
- arrobe ("at sign"): from Spanish arroba.
- arsenal ("arsenal") : from Italian (Venitian) arzana with final -l from an older tarsenal, tersenal, borrowed from Italian (cf. Neapolitan tarcenale), from Arabic dâr-sinâ or dār as-inā دار الصناعة
- artichaut ("artichoke") : from Italian articiocco, related to Spanish alcachofa, from Spanish Arabic haršûfa (Classical Arabic ḥáršafa) أرضي شوكي
- assassin ("assassin") : from Italian assassino, assessino, borrowed from unattested Arabic plural *Hashīshiyyīn "hashish smokers", derived of hašiš > hashish حشاشين
- aubergine ("aubergine") : from Catalan alberginía, itself from Arabic al bādinǧān, from Persian bātinǧān, ultimately from Sanskrit vatim-gana. البادنحات - الباذنجان
- avarie ("damage on a ship, vehicle or its cargo", cf. average) : from Genoese Medieval Latin avaria, itself from Arabic àwārīya, derived form of àwār "mistake, lack". (عوار (تالف
- azimut ("azimuth") : from Spanish acimut, itself from Arabic sumût, plural of samt "path, way" السمت
- azur ("azure") : from Medieval Latin azurium, itself from lāzaward "lapis lazuli" (cf. Judeo-French Lazur), borrowed from Persian lāzward. لازورد

== B ==
- babouche (slippers) بلغة
- baldaquin (baldachin)
- barkhane or barcane (barchan)
- baobab بو حباب
- baroud (raid) بارود
- benjoin (benzoin resin)
- benzine البنزين
- bergamote (bergamot orange) برتقال
- bezef (much, many), usually used in the negative form: pas bezeff (not much, not many)
- bled (colloquial: Place, Town) بلد
- borax بوراق
- bougie (candle) from Bejaia (بجاية, port town in Algeria), ultimately from Kabyle.

== C ==
- cafard (cockroach)
- café ("coffee", "café"): from Italian (Venice) caffè or / and from Turkish qahve, itself from Arabic qahwah قهوة
- caïd (chief of a mob; as a nickname, can be translated as "tiger") قائد
- calfeutrer (to draught-proof)
- calibre (standard for calibration, calibre, see also Caliper) قالب
- calife (caliph) خليفة
- camaïeu (camaieu)
- camphre (camphor) كافور
- candie ("Heraklion") قند (من سكر قندي)
- carafe (water pot) غرافة
- carat (gem mass or metal purity) قيراط
- carmin ("carmine") قرمزي
- caroussel ("carousel") كروي
- carvi ("caraway") كراوية
- chèque ("check") : from English check, itself from Old French eschec / echec (French échec), altered form of Latin scacus from Arabic صك, from Persian šāh, mixed up with Old Low Franconian *skāk "booty" (cf. German Schach)
- chiffre ("number", see Cipher) : from Arabic ṣifr صفر
- chouïa (slang for "a little") شوية
- civette ("chives", "civet") : probably from Catalan civetta, itself from Arabic zabād قط الزبّاد
- clebs (slang for "dog") كلاب
- coton ("cotton") : from Italian cotone, itself from Arabic qutun قطن
- cramoisi ("crimson") : alteration of Italian cremisi, itself from Arabic qirmizī "colour of the cochineal" قرمزي
- cuscute

== D ==
- divan ديوان
- douane ("customs") : from Old Italian doana, dovana, itself from Vulgar Arabic *duwān, alteration of dīwān, from Persian dīwān "customs"
- drogoman ترجمان

== E ==
- écarlate أقر طي
- échec (jeu d'échecs)
- éden عدن
- élixir الإكسير
- émir أمير
- épinard ("spinach") : maybe from Old Occitan spinarch, itself from Medieval Latin spinarchia, spinachium, borrowed from Spain Arabic isbināḫ, for asfanāḫ, isfināḫ, isfānâḫ, itself from Persian aspanāḫ, aspanāǧ, asfināǧ (FEW t. 19, pp. 11–12).
- erg عرق

== F ==
- fakir فقير
- fanfare ثرثار (brass band)
- fanfaron From Spanish fanfarrón (boaster)
- felouque (felucca) فلك ـ الفلك التي تجري في البحر
- flouze (slang for money) فلوس

== G ==
- gabelle
- gala : from Spanish gala
- gaze غاز
- gazelle : from Arabic ghazâl (غزال)
- gazette : from Italian gazetta غازات
- genette
- gerboise : ("Jerboa" )جربوع
- gilet
- girafe: from Italian giraffa, from Arabic zarâfah (زرافة)
- goudron قطران
- goule غول
- guitare : from Spanish guitarra, itself from Arabic قيثارة
- guitoune

== H ==
- hammam: from Arabic [ʜamˈmaːm] حمّام bathroom
- harem حرم
- hasard زهر النرد (Dice)
- haschisch: from Arabic [ʜaˈʃiːʃ] حشسيش grass
- henné: from Arabic: [ˈʜanna] حنّة

== J ==
- jarre جرة
- jasmin ياسمين
- jupe, jupon : from south Italian jupa "jacket" (Medieval Latin juppum), variant form of Italian giubba, itself from Arabic ǧubba « جبة

== K ==
- kif-kif كيف ـ كيف (the same)
- kermès قرمز
- kohol كحول

== L ==
- laiton
- laque
- lascar
- lilas الياف
- limonade ليموناضة
- loukoum حلقوم
- luth عود

== M ==
- maboule (mad, crazy) مهبول
- macramé مقرمة (macrame)
- magasin (مخزن (مغازة magazine
- marabout خرابط
- marcassite مرقشيثا (marcasite)
- maroquin المغرب morocco
- massepain (مرزبانية (حلوى لوز وسكر (Marzipan)
- massicot مقصلة (guillotine)
- matelas مطرح
- matraque مطرقة
- méchoui مشوي
- mesquin مسكين
- mohair (المخيّر (موهير (mohair)
- moire, moiré
- momie مومياء (Mummy)
- mosquée مسجد
- mouchtefert
- mousseline موصلي (Muslin)
- mousson موسم (monsoon)
- mulâtre
- muscade

== N ==
- nabab نائب
- nacre نقر
- nadir نظير
- naphte نفط
- natron النطرون
- nénufar
- noria
- nouba نوبة

== O ==
- orange نارنج
- ouate

== P ==
- pastèque بطيخ

== R ==
- raquette الراحة
- razzia غزوة
- récif رصيف
- riz ارز

== S ==
- saccharine سكر
- safari سفاري
- safran زعفران
- salamalec السلام عليكم
- santal صندل
- saphir صفير
- sarbacane زربطانة
- satin from Arabic الزيتون a city in China called Citong
- savate سبّاط (Savate)
- séné (نبات السنا)
- sirop شراب
- smala زملة
- sofa صُفّة
- sorbet from Persian شربة (from Arabic شراب(syrup))
- soude الصودا (Soda)
- souk سوق
- sucre سكر
- sultan سلطان

== T ==
- taffetas : التفتة taffeta
- talc : طلق (ṭalq)
- talisman : طلسم (ṭilasm)
- tare : طرح (ṭarḥ)
- tarif : تعريفة (taʿrīfa)
- timbale : طبل (ṭabl)
- toubib : طبيب (ṭabīb) (doctor)
- truchement : ترجمان (tarjumān)

== V ==
- varan
- vizir وزير

== Z ==
- zénith السمت
- zéro صفر

== See also ==
- Influence of Arabic on other languages
- List of English words of Arabic origin
- List of French loanwords in Persian
- List of Spanish words of Arabic origin
