= Cyphers =

Cyphers is a surname. Notable people with the surname include:

- Charles Cyphers (1939–2024), American actor
- Jeffrey Cyphers Wright (born 1951), American poet

== See also ==
- Cypher (disambiguation)
- Cyphers (magazine), Irish literary publication
