= Cypher stent =

Type of drug-eluting stent

Cypher is a brand of drug-eluting coronary stent from Cordis Corporation, a Cardinal Health company. During a balloon angioplasty, the stent is inserted into the artery to provide a "scaffold" to open the artery. An anti-rejection-type medication, sirolimus, helps to limit the overgrowth of normal cells while the artery heals which reduces the chance of re-blockage in the treated area known as restenosis, and reduces the chances that another procedure is required.

The Cypher stent was approved for use by the FDA in 2003. Following claims of inconsistent manufacturing processes and poor sales, Johnson & Johnson have announced that it will stop selling Cypher stents by the end of 2011.

== See also ==
- Sirolimus: Anti-proliferative effects
