= List of English words of Gaulish origin =

A list of English Language words derived from the Celtic Gaulish language, entering English via Old Frankish or Vulgar Latin and Old French

ambassador
from Old French embassadeur, from Latin ambactus, from Gaulish *ambactos, "servant", "henchman", "one who goes about".
basin
Perhaps originally Gaulish via Vulgar Latin and Old French
battle
from Latin battuere (="to beat, to strike") via French, from the same Gaulish root as "batter".
batter
from Old French batre (="to beat, strike"), ultimately from Gaulish.
battery
from Latin battuere via French, from the same Gaulish origin as "batter".
beak
from Old French bec, from Latin beccus, from Gaulish beccos.
beret
from French béret, perhaps ultimately of Gaulish origin.
bilge
from Old French boulge, from Latin bulga, from Gaulish bulgā, "sack".
billiard, billiards
perhaps from Gaulish via Latin billia and Old French bille.
Bourbon, bourbon
from Borvo, name of a local Celtic deity associated with thermal springs, whose name probably is related to Celtic borvo (="foam, froth"), via French.
bran
from Gaulish brennos, through the French bren, "the husk of wheat", "barley...".
branch
from Late Latin branca through Old French branche, probably ultimately of Gaulish origin.
brave
from Prov/Cat brau, from Gaulish bragos.
budge (lambskin)
from Old French bulge, from Latin bulga, from Gaulish bulgā, "sack".
brie
from Gaulish briga "hill, height"
broach
perhaps of Gaulish origin via Latin and Old French.
brooch
from the same origin as "broach".
broccoli
from Italian as a plural of broccolo "a sprout, cabbage sprout", ultimately from the same Gaulish root as "broach".
brochure
from French brochure "a stitched work," from brocher "to stitch" (sheets together), from Old French brochier "to prick, jab, pierce," from broche "pointed tool, awl", ultimately from the same Gaulish root as "broach".
budget
from Old French bougette, from bouge, from Latin bulga, from Gaulish bulgā.
bulge
from Old French boulge, from Latin bulga, from Gaulish bulgā, "sack", the same root as "bilge".
bushel
from Gaulish *bosta "palm of the hand" via French.
car
from Norman French carre, from L. carrum, carrus (pl. carra), orig. "two-wheeled Celtic war chariot," from Gaulish karros.
career
from Latin carrus, which ultimately derives from Gaulish.
cargo
from Latin carrus via Spanish, ultimately from the same Gaulish root as "car".
caricature
from French caricature (18c.), from Italian caricatura "satirical picture; an exaggeration," literally "an overloading," from caricare "to load; exaggerate," from Vulgar Latin *carricare "to load a wagon or cart," from Latin carrus "two-wheeled wagon", ultimately from the same Gaulish source as "car".
carousel
from French carrousel "a tilting match," from Italian carusiello, ultimately from the same Gaulish root as "car".
carpenter
from Gaulish, from Old Celtic *carpentom, which is probably related to Gaulish karros (="chariot").
carriage
from Latin carrus, ultimately from the same Gaulish root as "car" and "carry".
carry
from Gaulish karros "two-wheeled Celtic war chariot" via French
chock
possibly from Old North French choque "a block" (Old French çoche "log," 12c.; Modern French souche "stump, stock, block"), from Gaulish *tsukka "a tree trunk, stump."
change
from Old French changier, "to change, alter", from the late Latin word cambiare derived from an older Latin word cambire, "to barter, exchange", a word of Gaulish origin, from PIE root *kemb- "to bend, crook".
charge
from Latin carrus via French, ultimately from the same Gaulish root as "car".
chariot
from Late Latin carrum via French, ultimately from the same Gaulish root as "car".
combat
from the root battuere "to beat, fight", which is believed to ultimately come from Gaulish via French.
cream
from Old French cresme, from the Latin word of Gaulish origin crāmum.
debate
from the root battuere "to beat, fight", which is believed to ultimately come from Gaulish via French.
drape
from Old French draper "to weave, make cloth", from Late Latin drapus, which is perhaps of Gaulish origin.
druid
from Gaulish Druides via French
dune
from French dune, from Middle Dutch dūne, probably from Gaulish dunum, "hill".
embassy
from Middle French embassee, from Italian ambasciata, from Old Provençal ambaisada, from Latin Ambactus, from Gaulish *ambactos, "servant", "henchman", "one who goes about".
exchange
from the same Gaulish root as "change"
frown
probably from Gaulish *frogna "nostril" via Old French frognier "to frown or scowl, snort, turn up one's nose"
gallon
Perhaps from Gaulish galla "vessel" via Vulgar Latin and Old French.
garter
from Old North French gartier (="band just above or below the knee"), perhaps ultimately from Gaulish.
glean
from Old French glener, from Late Latin glennare, from Gaulish glanos, "clean".
gob
from Old French gobe, likely from Gaulish *gobbo-.
gouge
probably from Gaulish via Late Latin/Old French
hibiscus
perhaps from Gaulish via Greek hibiskos and then Latin hibiscum, hibiscus (="marshmallow plant").
javelin
from Old French javelline, diminutive of javelot, from Vulgar Latin gabalus, from Gaulish gabalum.
lozenge
Probably from a pre-Roman Celtic language, perhaps Iberian *lausa or Gaulish *lausa "flat stone"
marl
from Gaulish according to Pliny.
mine (noun)
from Old French mine (="vein, lode; tunnel, shaft; mineral ore; mine" (for coal, tin, etc,)) and from Medieval Latin mina, minera (="ore,"), probably ultimately from Old Celtic *meini-
mineral
from the same Gaulish root as "mine".
mutt
a shortening of muttonhead, ultimately from the same root as mutton.
mutton
from Gallo-Roman *multo-s via Old French
osier
from Old French osier, ozier "willow twig" (13c.) and directly from Medieval Latin osera, osiera "willow," ausaria "willow bed," a word of unknown origin, perhaps from Gaulish.
palfrey
from Old French palefrei, from Latin paraverēdus from Greek para + Latin verēdus, from Gaulish *vorēdos.
piece
from Old French, from Vulgar Latin *pettia, likely from Gaulish.
quay
from Old French chai, from Gaulish caium.
socket
from Gaulish/Proto-Celtic *sukko-, via Vulgar Latin *soccus and Old French soc.
tonsil
perhaps of Gaulish origin via Latin
truant
from Old French, from Gaulish *trougo-, "miser".
valet
from French, from Gallo-Romance *vassallittus, from Middle Latin vassallus, from vassus, from Old Celtic *wasso-, "young man", "squire".
varlet
from Middle French, from Gallo-Romance *vassallittus, from Middle Latin vassallus, from vassus, from Old Celtic *wasso-, "young man", "squire".
vassal
from Old French, from Middle Latin vassallus, from vassus, from Old Celtic *wasso-, "young man", "squire".
